= Ḻa =

Letter "Ḻa" in Indic scripts

Example glyphs
- Tamil: ள
- Thai: ฬ
- Malayalam: ള
- Sinhala: ළ
- Ashoka Brahmi: 𑀴
- Devanagari: ळ

Cognates
- Hebrew: ל
- Greek: Λ
- Latin: L, Ł, Ɬ
- Cyrillic: Л, Љ, Ԓ, Ӆ

Properties
- Phonemic representation: /ɭ/
- ISO 15919 transliteration: ḷ Ḷ
- IAST transliteration: ḻ Ḻ
- ISCII code point: D2 (210)

Ḻa (IAST) or Ḷa (ISO 15919) is a consonant of Indic abugidas. In modern Indic scripts, La is derived from the early "Ashoka" Brahmi letter 𑀴.

== Devanagari Ḻa ==
Devanagari Ḻa

Ḻa (ळ) is an additional Devanagari character originally used for an allophone of the voiced retroflex stop in Vedic Sanskrit, and current represents the lateral flap [𝼈] that occurs in Marathi, Konkani, Garhwali, and Rajasthani.

Devanagari ळ with vowel marks
Ḻa	Ḻā	Ḻi	Ḻī	Ḻu	Ḻū	Ḻr	Ḻr̄	Ḻl	Ḻl̄	Ḻe	Ḻai	Ḻo	Ḻau	Ḻ
ळ	ळा	ळि	ळी	ळु	ळू	ळृ	ळॄ	ळॢ	ळॣ	ळे	ळै	ळो	ळौ	ळ्

=== Conjuncts with ळ ===
Half form of Ḻa.

Devanagari exhibits conjunct ligatures, as is common in Indic scripts. In modern Devanagari texts, most conjuncts are formed by reducing the letter shape to fit tightly to the following letter, usually by dropping a character's vertical stem, sometimes referred to as a "half form". Some conjunct clusters are always represented by a true ligature, instead of a shape that can be broken into constituent independent letters. Vertically stacked conjuncts are ubiquitous in older texts, while only a few are still used routinely in modern Devanagari texts. The use of ligatures and vertical conjuncts may vary across languages using the Devanagari script, with Marathi in particular preferring the use of half forms where texts in other languages would show ligatures and vertical stacks.

==== Ligature conjuncts of ळ ====
- Repha र् (r) + ळ (ḻa) gives the ligature rḻa:

- Eyelash र्‍ (r) + ळ (ḻa) gives the ligature rḻa:

== Telugu Lla ==
Telugu independent and subjoined Lla.

In addition to La (ల), Telugu has a second /l/ consonant Lla (ళ). It is closely related to the Kannada letter ಳ. Most Telugu consonants contain a v-shaped headstroke that is related to the horizontal headline found in other Indic scripts, although headstrokes do not connect adjacent letters in Telugu. The headstroke is normally lost when adding vowel matras.

== Malayalam Ḻa ==
Malayalam letter Ḻa

Ḻa (ള) is a consonant of the Malayalam abugida. Like in other Indic scripts, Malayalam consonants have the inherent vowel "a", and take one of several modifying vowel signs to represent syllables with another vowel or no vowel at all.

Malayalam Ḻa matras: Ḻa, Ḻā, Ḻi, Ḻī, Ḻu, Ḻū, Ḻr̥, Ḻr̥̄, Ḻl̥, Ḻl̥̄, Ḻe, Ḻē, Ḻai, Ḻo, Ḻō, Ḻau, and Ḻ.

=== Conjuncts of ള ===
Malayalam letter Chillu Ḻ

As is common in Indic scripts, Malayalam joins letters together to form conjunct consonant clusters. There are several ways in which conjuncts are formed in Malayalam texts: using a post-base form of a trailing consonant placed under the initial consonant of a conjunct, a combined ligature of two or more consonants joined, a conjoining form that appears as a combining mark on the rest of the conjunct, the use of an explicit candrakkala mark to suppress the inherent "a" vowel, or a special consonant form called a "chillu" letter, representing a bare consonant without the inherent "a" vowel. Texts written with the modern reformed Malayalam orthography, put̪iya lipi, may favor more regular conjunct forms than older texts in paḻaya lipi, due to changes undertaken in the 1970s by the Government of Kerala.

- ള് (ḻ) + ള (ḻa) gives the ligature ḻḻa:

== Odia Ḻa ==
Odia independent and subjoined letter Ḻa.

In addition to ଲ (La), Odia also has a second La character, ଳ (Ḻa). It is descended from the Siddhaṃ letter Ḻa. Like other Odia letters, ଳ has the inherent vowel "a", and takes one of several modifying vowel signs to represent syllables with another vowel or no vowel at all.

Odia Ḻa with vowel matras
Ḻa	Ḻā	Ḻi	Ḻī	Ḻu	Ḻū	Ḻr̥	Ḻr̥̄	Ḻl̥	Ḻl̥̄	Ḻe	Ḻai	Ḻo	Ḻau	Ḻ
ଳ	ଳା	ଳି	ଳୀ	ଳୁ	ଳୂ	ଳୃ	ଳୄ	ଳୢ	ଳୣ	ଳେ	ଳୈ	ଳୋ	ଳୌ	ଳ୍

Like the letter ଲ, ଳ generates conjuncts only by subjoining and does not form ligatures.

== Comparison of Ḻa ==
The various Indic scripts are generally related to each other through adaptation and borrowing, and as such the glyphs for cognate letters, including La, are related as well. Where multiple characters are shown, the final character is Ḻa, except for Tocharian, New Tai Lue and Tai Viet.

Comparison of Ḻa in different scripts

Aramaic -
Kharoṣṭhī -	Ashoka Brahmi 𑁵	Kushana Brahmi (Note: The middle "Kushana" form of Brahmi is a later style that emerged as Brahmi scripts were beginning to proliferate. Gupta Brahmi was definitely a stylistic descendant from Kushana, but other Brahmi-derived scripts may have descended from earlier forms.) 𑁵	Tocharian (Note: Tocharian is probably derived from the middle period "Kushana" form of Brahmi, although artifacts from that time are not plentiful enough to establish a definite succession.) -
Gupta Brahmi 𑁵	Pallava -
Kadamba -
Bhaiksuki -	Siddhaṃ -	Grantha 𑌳	Cham -
Sinhala ළ	Pyu / Old Mon (Note: Pyu and Old Mon are probably the precursors of the Burmese script, and may be derived from either the Pallava or Kadamba script) -
Tibetan -	Newa -	Ahom 𑝆	Malayalam ള
Telugu ళ	Burmese ဠ
Lepcha -	Ranjana -	Saurashtra ꢳ	Dives Akuru 𑤮
Kannada ಳ	Kayah Li -
Limbu -	Soyombo (Note: May also be derived from Devangari (see bottom left of table)) -	Khmer ឡ	Tamil
Chakma -	Tai Tham ᩊ
Meitei Mayek -	Gaudi -	Thai ฬ	Lao ຬ
Tai Le -
Marchen -	Tirhuta -	New Tai Lue -	Tai Viet -	Aksara Kawi -
'Phags-pa -	Odia ଳ	Sharada 𑆭	Rejang -	Batak -	Buginese -
Zanabazar Square -	Bengali–Assamese -	Takri -	Javanese -	Balinese -	Makasar -
Hangul (Note: The Origin of Hangul from 'Phags-pa is one of limited influence, inspiring at most a few basic letter shapes. Hangul does not function as an Indic abugida.) -	Northern Nagari -	Dogri -	Laṇḍā -	Sundanese -	Baybayin -
Modi 𑘯	Gujarati ળ	Khojki 𑈫	Khudabadi -	Mahajani -	Tagbanwa -
Devanagari	Nandinagari 𑧏	Kaithi -	Gurmukhi ਲ਼	Multani -	Buhid -
Canadian Syllabics (Note: Although the basic letter forms of the Canadian Aboriginal Syllabics were derived from handwritten Devanagari letters, this abugida indicates vowel sounds by rotations of the letter form, rather than the use of vowel diacritics as is standard in Indic abugidas.) -	Soyombo (Note: May also be derived from Ranjana (see above)) -	Sylheti Nagari -	Gunjala Gondi 𑵿	Masaram Gondi (Note: Masaram Gondi acts as an Indic abugida, but its letterforms were not derived from any single precursor script.) 𑴭	Hanuno'o -

== Character encodings of Ḻa ==
Most Indic scripts are encoded in the Unicode Standard, and as such the letter Ḻa in those scripts can be represented in plain text with unique codepoint. La from several modern-use scripts can also be found in legacy encodings, such as ISCII.

Character information
Preview	ळ		ળ		ਲ਼		𑁵	
Unicode name	DEVANAGARI LETTER LLA		GUJARATI LETTER LLA		GURMUKHI LETTER LLA		BRAHMI LETTER OLD TAMIL LLA	
Encodings	decimal	hex	dec	hex	dec	hex	dec	hex
Unicode	2355	U+0933	2739	U+0AB3	2611	U+0A33	69749	U+11075
UTF-8	224 164 179	E0 A4 B3	224 170 179	E0 AA B3	224 168 179	E0 A8 B3	240 145 129 181	F0 91 81 B5
UTF-16	2355	0933	2739	0AB3	2611	0A33	55300 56437	D804 DC75
Numeric character reference	&#2355;	&#x933;	&#2739;	&#xAB3;	&#2611;	&#xA33;	&#69749;	&#x11075;
ISCII	210	D2	210	D2				

Character information
Preview	ள		𑌳		ള		ൾ		ళ		ಳ		ଳ	
Unicode name	TAMIL LETTER LLA		GRANTHA LETTER LLA		MALAYALAM LETTER LLA		MALAYALAM LETTER CHILLU LL		TELUGU LETTER LLA		KANNADA LETTER LLA		ORIYA LETTER LLA	
Encodings	decimal	hex	dec	hex	dec	hex	dec	hex	dec	hex	dec	hex	dec	hex
Unicode	2995	U+0BB3	70451	U+11333	3379	U+0D33	3454	U+0D7E	3123	U+0C33	3251	U+0CB3	2867	U+0B33
UTF-8	224 174 179	E0 AE B3	240 145 140 179	F0 91 8C B3	224 180 179	E0 B4 B3	224 181 190	E0 B5 BE	224 176 179	E0 B0 B3	224 178 179	E0 B2 B3	224 172 179	E0 AC B3
UTF-16	2995	0BB3	55300 57139	D804 DF33	3379	0D33	3454	0D7E	3123	0C33	3251	0CB3	2867	0B33
Numeric character reference	&#2995;	&#xBB3;	&#70451;	&#x11333;	&#3379;	&#xD33;	&#3454;	&#xD7E;	&#3123;	&#xC33;	&#3251;	&#xCB3;	&#2867;	&#xB33;

Character information
Preview	ฬ		ຬ		ឡ		ဠ		ᩊ	
Unicode name	THAI CHARACTER LO CHULA		LAO LETTER PALI LLA		KHMER LETTER LA		MYANMAR LETTER LLA		TAI THAM LETTER LLA	
Encodings	decimal	hex	dec	hex	dec	hex	dec	hex	dec	hex
Unicode	3628	U+0E2C	3756	U+0EAC	6049	U+17A1	4128	U+1020	6730	U+1A4A
UTF-8	224 184 172	E0 B8 AC	224 186 172	E0 BA AC	225 158 161	E1 9E A1	225 128 160	E1 80 A0	225 169 138	E1 A9 8A
Numeric character reference	&#3628;	&#xE2C;	&#3756;	&#xEAC;	&#6049;	&#x17A1;	&#4128;	&#x1020;	&#6730;	&#x1A4A;

Character information
Preview	𑘯		𑧏		𑈫		𑴭		𑵿		ꢳ		𑤮		𑆭	
Unicode name	MODI LETTER LLA		NANDINAGARI LETTER LLA		KHOJKI LETTER LLA		KHOJKI LETTER LLA		GUNJALA GONDI LETTER LLA		SAURASHTRA LETTER LLA		DIVES AKURU LETTER LLA		SHARADA LETTER LLA	
Encodings	decimal	hex	dec	hex	dec	hex	dec	hex	dec	hex	dec	hex	dec	hex	dec	hex
Unicode	71215	U+1162F	72143	U+119CF	70187	U+1122B	73005	U+11D2D	73087	U+11D7F	43187	U+A8B3	71982	U+1192E	70061	U+111AD
UTF-8	240 145 152 175	F0 91 98 AF	240 145 167 143	F0 91 A7 8F	240 145 136 171	F0 91 88 AB	240 145 180 173	F0 91 B4 AD	240 145 181 191	F0 91 B5 BF	234 162 179	EA A2 B3	240 145 164 174	F0 91 A4 AE	240 145 134 173	F0 91 86 AD
UTF-16	55301 56879	D805 DE2F	55302 56783	D806 DDCF	55300 56875	D804 DE2B	55303 56621	D807 DD2D	55303 56703	D807 DD7F	43187	A8B3	55302 56622	D806 DD2E	55300 56749	D804 DDAD
Numeric character reference	&#71215;	&#x1162F;	&#72143;	&#x119CF;	&#70187;	&#x1122B;	&#73005;	&#x11D2D;	&#73087;	&#x11D7F;	&#43187;	&#xA8B3;	&#71982;	&#x1192E;	&#70061;	&#x111AD;
