= Ī (Malayalam) =

Fourth letter of the Malayalam script

ഈ is the fourth letter of the Malayalam script. It is an independent vowel letter that represents the long close front unrounded vowel /iː/. In the Malayalam abugida, ഈ is classified as a guru (long vowel), a category that influences metrical rules in poetry and grammatical sandhi.
