= I (Malayalam) =

Third letter of the Malayalam script

ഇ is the third letter of the Malayalam script. It is an independent vowel letter that represents the close front unrounded vowel /i/. In the Malayalam abugida, ഇ is classified as a laghu (short vowel), a category that influences metrical rules in poetry and grammatical sandhi.
