= Romanisation of Malayalam =

Schemes for the Malayalam script

There are several romanisation schemes for the Malayalam script, including ITRANS and ISO 15919.

== ASCII schemes ==
Typesetting Malayalam on computers became an issue with their spread in the late 20th century. The lack of diacritics on keyboards led to the adoption of ASCII only romanisation schemes. ASCII only schemes remain popular in email correspondence and input methods because of their ease of entry. These schemes are also called Manglish. The disadvantage of ASCII schemes is that letter case is meaningful, so that transliterated names may not be capitalised.

=== Mozhi ===
The Mozhi system of transliteration is an unofficial system used to transliterate Malayalam, it can also be used for Tamil. This system does not need the use of diacritics. Even though it has more elaborate scheme, Mozhi is as follows:

aa i ii u uu R RR
e  E  ai o O  au Ll Lll am aH

k  kh  g gh ng
ch chh j jh nj
T  Th  D Dh N
th thh d dh n
p  ph  b bh m

y  r   l v
S  sh  s h
L  zh  rr t

=== ITRANS ===
ITRANS is an ASCII scheme which does not use diacritics for transliteration to Latin script.

== National Library at Kolkata romanisation ==
The "National Library at Kolkata romanisation" is one of the most widely used transliteration schemes in dictionaries and grammars of Indo-Aryan languages and Dravidian languages including Malayalam. This transliteration scheme is also known as '(American) Library of Congress' scheme and is nearly identical to one of the possible ISO 15919 variants. The scheme is an extension of the IAST scheme that is used for transliteration of Sanskrit.

== ISO 15919 ==
ISO 15919 "Transliteration of Devanagari and related Indic scripts into Latin characters" is one of a series of international standards for romanisation. It was published in 2001 and uses diacritics to map the much larger set of consonants and vowels in Brahmic scripts to the Latin script.
