= Mozhi =

Mozhi may refer to:

- Mozhi (transliteration), a system of romanisation used for Malayalam script
- Mozhi (film), a 2007 Tamil film produced by Prakash Raj and directed by Radha Mohan
