= A (Malayalam) =

First letter of the Malayalam script

- അ

Usage
- Writing system: Malayalam script
- Type: Abugidaic
- Language of origin: Malayalam language
- Sound values: [ɐ]
- In Unicode: U+0D05
- Lexicographic position: 1

History
- Development: 𓃾: 𑌅; അ
- Time period: since c. 830 CE
- Sisters: 𑎀; ꢂ

Other
- Writing direction: Left-to-right

അ is the first letter of the Malayalam script. It is an independent vowel letter that represents the near-open central vowel /ɐ/. In the Malayalam abugida, അ is classified as a laghu (short vowel), a category that influences metrical rules in poetry and grammatical sandhi.

As the inherent vowel of the script, the sound /ɐ/ is implied in every consonant letter unless otherwise indicated by a diacritic. For example, the consonant letter ക (ka) represents the sound /kɐ/.
