= Mozhi (transliteration) =

Popular romanization scheme for Malayalam script

The Mozhi is a popular romanization scheme for Malayalam script. It is primarily used for Input Method Editors for Malayalam and loosely based on ITrans scheme for Devanagari.

== Inventory ==
This system does not need the use of diacritics; instead, uses letter case distinction to indicate difference in vowel lengths and different groups of consonants. However, Mozhi has additional mappings to allow input using only the lowercase letters.

Malayalam	Latin	Category
അ	a	Vowels
ആ	aa	Vowels
ഇ	i	Vowels
ഈ	ii	Vowels
ഉ	u	Vowels
ഊ	uu	Vowels
എ	e	Vowels
ഏ	E, ea	Vowels
ഒ	o	Vowels
ഓ	O, oa	Vowels
ഔ	au	Vowels
ഐ	ai	Vowels
ഋ	R, r	Vowels
അം	am	Anusvara
അഃ	aH	Visarga
്	`	Chandrakkala/Virama
ക	ka	Velar Consonants
ഖ	kha	Velar Consonants
ഗ	ga	Velar Consonants
ഘ	gha	Velar Consonants
ങ	nga	Velar Consonants
ച	cha	Palatal Consonants
ഛ	chha	Palatal Consonants
ജ	ja	Palatal Consonants
ഝ	jha	Palatal Consonants
ഞ	nja	Palatal Consonants
ട	Ta, tta	Retroflex Consonants
ഠ	Tha, ttha	Retroflex Consonants
ഡ	Da, dta	Retroflex Consonants
ഢ	Dha, dtha	Retroflex Consonants
ണ	Na, nha	Retroflex Consonants
ത	tha	Dental Consonants
ഥ	thha	Dental Consonants
ദ	dha	Dental Consonants
ധ	dhha	Dental Consonants
ന	na	Dental Consonants
പ	pa	Labial Consonants
ഫ	pha	Labial Consonants
ബ	ba	Labial Consonants
ഭ	bha	Labial Consonants
മ	ma	Labial Consonants
യ	ya	Approximant Consonants
ര	ra	Approximant Consonants
ല	la	Approximant Consonants
വ	va	Approximant Consonants
ള	La, lha	Approximant Consonants
ഴ	zha	Approximant Consonants
ശ	Sa, za	Fricative Consonants
ഷ	sha	Fricative Consonants
സ	sa	Fricative Consonants
ഹ	ha	Fricative Consonants
റ	Ra, rra	Trill

== Features ==
Since Mozhi is targeted for input, it has features tuned for that:

- Multiple Latin letters or sequences for one Malayalam character. Example: both 'za' and 'Sa' maps to 'ശ'.
- Archaic or scholarly characters are defined as refinement on contemporary characters. Example: '1#' generates native digit '൧', with '#' being the 'archaic character' operator to suffix.
- Ability to escape the Malayalam input by prefixing with '\'.
