= Malabar script =

The Malabar script (Malayalam: മലവാരലിപി, Malavāralipi, IPA: [mɐləbaːrɐ lɪβɪ]) is a Brahmic script used commonly to write the Malabari Malayalam or Mappila Malayalam. Like many other Indic scripts, it is an abugida, or a writing system that is partially “alphabetic” and partially syllable-based.

== Overview ==
Malabar script is very similar to Malayalam script. However, some letters have different pronunciation. For example, വ (ba) in Malabar script is വ (va) in Malayalam script.
