= U (Malayalam) =

Fifth letter of the Malayalam script

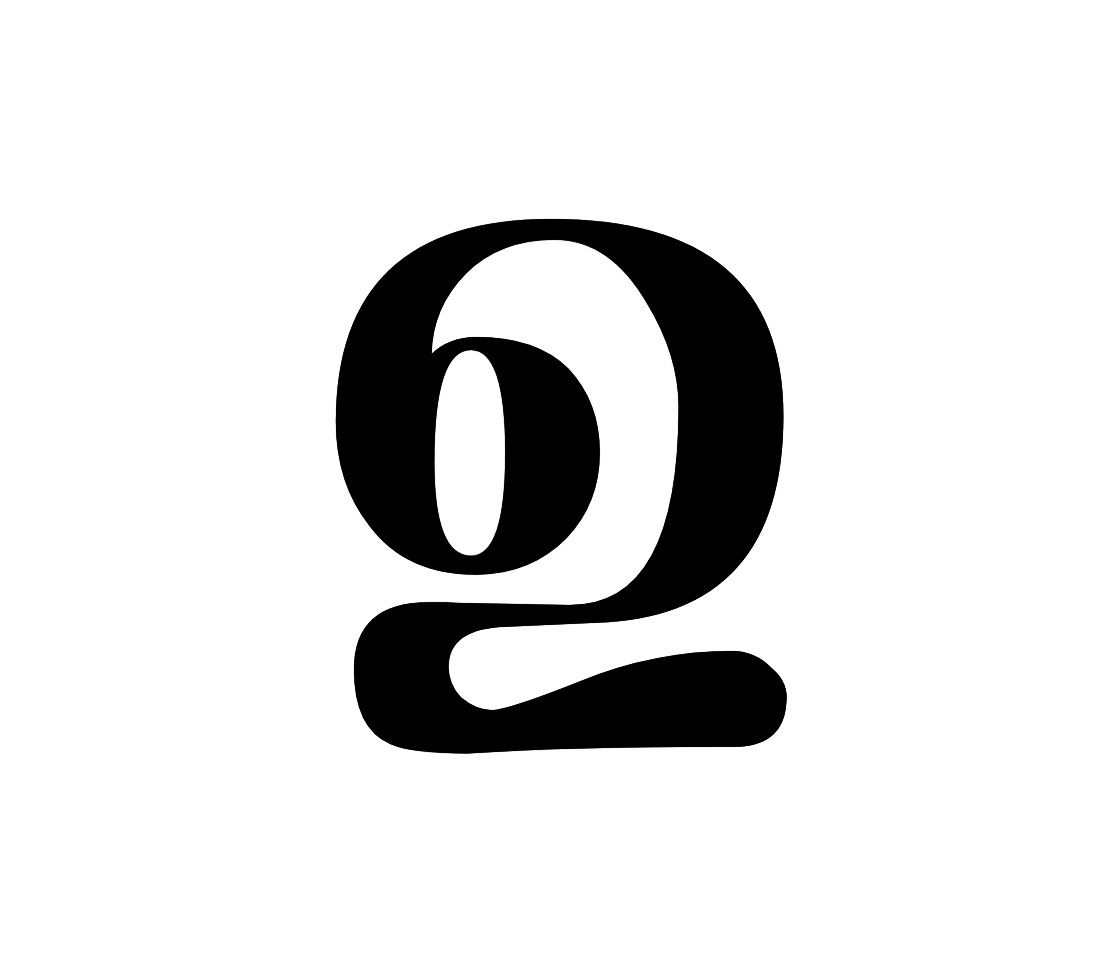
The symbol for ഉ.

ഉ is the fifth letter of the Malayalam script. It is an independent vowel letter that represents the close back rounded vowel /u/. In the Malayalam abugida, ഉ is classified as a laghu (short vowel), a category that influences metrical rules in poetry and grammatical sandhi.
