= Ā (Malayalam) =

Second letter of the Malayalam script

ആ is the second letter of the Malayalam script. It is an independent vowel letter that represents the open central unrounded vowel /ä/. In the Malayalam abugida, ആ is classified as a guru (long vowel), a category that influences metrical rules in poetry and grammatical sandhi.
