= Inherent vowel =

Vowel inherently read as part of a consonant

An inherent vowel is part of an abugida (or alphasyllabary) script. It is a vowel sound which is used with each unmarked or basic consonant symbol.

There are many known abugida scripts, including most of the Brahmic scripts and Kharosthi, the cursive Meroitic script, which developed in Nubia (today in Southern Egypt and Northern Sudan), and the Ge'ez script. Many of them are still used today. Old Persian cuneiform also uses a device similar to an inherent vowel, though only with a subset of its consonants, so some authors do not consider it to be a true abugida. Although it is the earliest known script to use the inherent vowel principle (from the 6th century BC), no direct link among these four writing traditions has yet been demonstrated.

Most Brahmic scripts and Ge'ez scripts use the consonant characters as base graphemes, from which the syllables are built up. Base graphemes having a consonant with an inherent vowel can be usually changed to other graphemes by joining a tone mark or dependent vowel to the grapheme. Meroitic and Old Persian cuneiform instead mark syllables with non-inherent vowels by following the base character with a character representing one of the non-inherent vowels.

Writing systems with inherent vowels often use a special marking (a diacritic) to suppress the inherent vowel so that only a consonant is represented, such as the virama found in many South Asian scripts. Other systems rely on the reader's knowledge of the language to distinguish a consonant with the inherent vowel from a pure consonant (Hindi, Old Persian cuneiform) or to distinguish a particular vowel-marked form from a pure consonant (Ge'ez and related scripts).

For example, the Hindi word कष is pronounced kaṣa, but क्‌ष is pronounced kṣa, because the virama symbol ् cancels the inherent vowel in क ka.

== Thai script ==
An example of inherent vowels using a real-world example from an abugida would be in Thai script, a Brahmic script. In Thai, the word for "ant" มด would be written as md if using a direct Roman transcription, but it must be pronounced mót, with ó being the inherent, unwritten vowel in the word.

An example of a word in Thai with multi-syllable words with an inherent vowel is สวัสดี, which would be written as swàtdee without spaces and ส วัส ดี s-wàt-dee with spaces, but it must be pronounced as sà-wàt-dee because even though the first syllable is only written as the consonant s, in must be spoken as sà because consonants may not be spoken in Thai without any vowels following afterwards.

The names of Thai letters directly demonstrate how inherent vowels are used. In Thai, each letter's name has at least two syllables, with the first being the consonant with the inherent vowel and the second syllable being the word where the consonant is used. The letter ก is named ก ไก่, or g(aw) gài. The letter itself, the first syllable, is always pronounced with -aw after the consonant.

Like in English and French, many words in Thai contain silent letters. Most of these words are loanwords from South Asian languages, such as Pali, Sanskrit, as well as English. In Thai, the superscript symbol ◌์, thanthakhat or karan, indicates that the consonant written below is silent. For example, the Thai word sǐngha สิงห์ is actually produced sǐng because the consonant ห์ is silent, since ◌์ silences the consonant ห.

== Khmer script ==
Khmer script is an abugida with elements of syllabaries. Unlike in Thai, consonants can be stacked vertically, with most consonants having default and subscript forms. For example, the Khmer word phnom ភ្នំ as in Phnom Penh is written in one consonant space with three consonants, with ភ being ph, ្ន being the subscript form of ន n, and ំ being the final -m to be pronounced after the vowel. Even though the word is written as phnm, the vowel o is the inherent vowel, thus it should be pronounced phnom. An example of a word with stacked consonants and a vowel is sri ស្រី, in which ស is s, ្រ is the subscript form of រ r, and ី being the vowel i.
