= Malayalam script =

Brahmic script used commonly to write the Malayalam language

Malayalam Script മലയാളലിപി
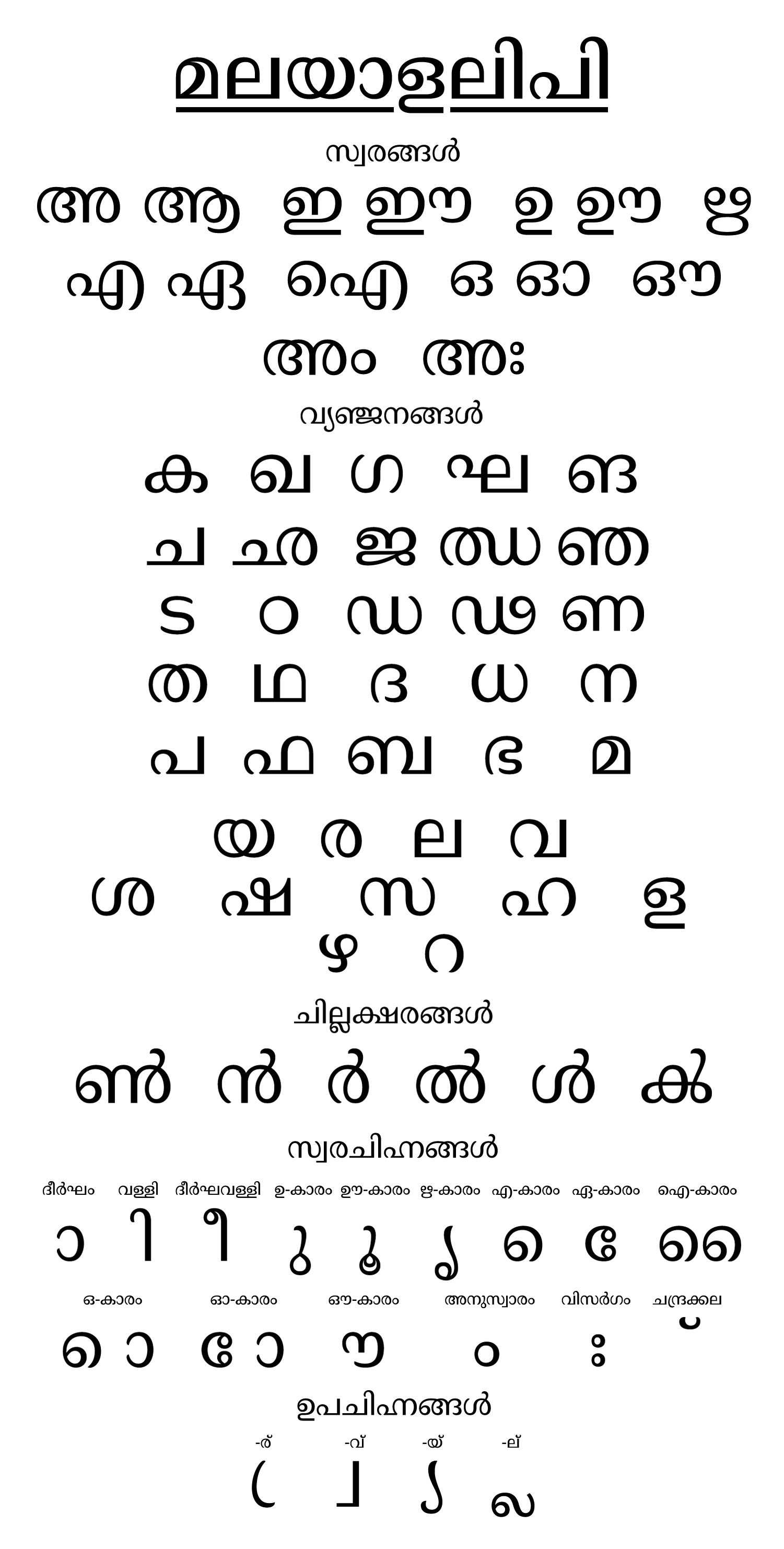
- Malayalam Aksharamala (Alphabet Chart) divided into 15 vowels (സ്വരാക്ഷരങ്ങൾ), 36 basic consonants (വ്യഞ്ജനാക്ഷരങ്ങൾ),6 voiceless consonants (ചില്ലക്ഷരങ്ങൾ) (Note: ൿ is officially a part of the modern script, but is not used in modern spellings compared to the other 5 letters.), 15 vowel diacritics (സ്വരചിഹ്നങ്ങൾ) and 4 subscript consonant forms (ഉപചിഹ്നങ്ങൾ). (Note: Malayalam has a large set of archaic characters which are no longer used. Malayalam also has two orthographic styles which are used in equal measure in print and digital media.)
- Script type: Abugida
- Period: c. 13th century – present
- Direction: Left-to-right
- Languages: Malayalam; Sanskrit; Tulu; Jeseri; Konkani; Paniya; Betta Kurumba; Ravula and other minor languages

Related scripts
- Parent systems: Egyptian: Proto-Sinaitic; Phoenician; Aramaic (debated) (Note: The origin of the Brahmi script remains debated. The traditional view derives it from the Aramaic alphabet, while other scholars have proposed indigenous development or hybrid derivation involving multiple writing systems.); Brahmi script; Tamil-Brahmi; Pallava script; Grantha script (with Vattezhuthu influence); Tigalari-Malayalam; Malayalam Script
- Sister systems: Tigalari script Thirke script Dhives Akuru; Saurashtra script

ISO 15924
- ISO 15924: Mlym (347), Malayalam

Unicode
- Unicode alias: Malayalam
- Unicode range: U+0D00–U+0D7F

Malayalam script (Malayāḷa lipi; IPA: [mələjaːɭə lipi] / Malayalam: മലയാളലിപി) is a Brahmic abugida used to write Malayalam, the principal language of Kerala, India, spoken by 45 million people. Malayalam is a Dravidian language spoken in the Indian state of Kerala and the union territories of Lakshadweep and Puducherry (Mahé district) by the Malayali people. It is one of the official scripts of India.

The Malayalam script is the sister script of the Tigalari script, used to write the Tulu language, spoken in coastal Karnataka (Dakshina Kannada and Udupi districts) and the northernmost Kasargod district of Kerala. Like many Indic scripts, it is an alphasyllabary (abugida), a writing system that is partially "alphabetic" and partially syllable-based. The modern Malayalam alphabet has 15 vowel letters, 42 consonant letters, and a few other symbols. The Malayalam script is a Vatteluttu alphabet extended with symbols from the Grantha alphabet to represent Indo-Aryan loanwords. The script is also used to write several minority languages such as Paniya, Betta Kurumba, and Ravula. The Malayalam language itself has been historically written in several different scripts.

== History ==
Malayalam was first written in Vattezhuthu script, an ancient script of Tamil and Malayalam languages. Modern Malayalam script evolved from the Grantha alphabet, and Vattezhuthu, both of which evolved independently from Tamil-Brahmi script.

Vatteluttu (Malayalam: വട്ടെഴുത്ത്, romanized: Vaṭṭeḻuttŭ, lit. 'round writing') is a script that had evolved from Tamil-Brahmi and was once used extensively in the southern part of present-day Tamil Nadu and in Kerala. The Vazhappally inscription issued by Rajashekhara Varman is the earliest example, dating from about 830 CE. During the medieval period, the Tigalari script that was used for writing Tulu in South Canara, and Sanskrit in the adjacent Malabar region, was very similar to the modern Malayalam script. In the Tamil state, the modern Tamil script had supplanted Vattezhuthu by the 15th century, but in the Malabar region, Vattezhuthu remained in general use up to the 17th century, or the 18th century. A variant form of this script, Kolezhuthu, was used until about the 19th century mainly in the Malabar-Cochin area. Another variant form, Malayanma, was used in the south of Thiruvananthapuram.

According to Arthur Coke Burnell, one form of the Grantha alphabet, originally used in the Chola dynasty, was imported into the southwest coast of India in the 8th or 9th century, and then modified in course of time in this secluded area, where communication with the east coast was very limited. It later evolved into Tigalari-Malayalam script was used by the Malayali, Havyaka Brahmins and Tulu Brahmin people, but was originally only used to write Sanskrit. This script split into two scripts: Tigalari and Malayalam. While Malayalam script was extended and modified to write vernacular language Malayalam, the Tigalari was written for Sanskrit only. In Malabar, this writing system was termed Arya-eluttu (ആര്യ എഴുത്ത്, Ārya eḻuttŭ), meaning "Arya writing" (Sanskrit is Indo-Aryan language while Malayalam is a Dravidian language).

Vatteluttu was in general use, but was not suitable for literature where many Sanskrit words were used. Like Tamil-Brahmi, it was originally used to write Tamil, and as such, did not have letters for voiced or aspirated consonants used in Sanskrit but not used in Tamil. For this reason, Vatteluttu and the Grantha alphabet were sometimes mixed, as in the Manipravalam. One of the oldest examples of the Manipravalam literature, Vaishikatantram (വൈശികതന്ത്രം, Vaiśikatantram), dates back to the 12th century, where the earliest form of the Malayalam script was used, which seems to have been systematised to some extent by the first half of the 13th century.

Thunchaththu Ezhuthachan is credited with developing Malayalam script into its current form through the intermixing and modification of Vatteluttu, Kolezhuthu, and Grantha script, which were used to write the inscriptions and literary works of Old and Middle Malayalam. He further eliminated excess and unnecessary letters from the modified script. Thunchaththu Ezhuthachan, a poet from around the 16th century, used Arya-eluttu to write his Malayalam poems based on Classical Sanskrit literature. For a few letters missing in Arya-eluttu (ḷa, ḻa, ṟa), he used Vatteluttu. The popularity of his works caused the Malayali people to call him the father of the Malayalam language, which also popularised Arya-eluttu as a script to write Malayalam. Grantha did not have distinctions between e and ē, and between o and ō, as it was as an alphabet to write a Sanskrit language. The Malayalam script as it is today was modified in the middle of the 19th century when Hermann Gundert invented the new vowel signs to distinguish them.

By the 19th century, old scripts like Kolezhuthu had been supplanted by Arya-eluttu – that is the current Malayalam script. It is now widely used in the Malayali press in Kerala.

=== Orthography reform ===
In 1961, the Government of Kerala reformed the orthography of Malayalam by a government order to the education department. The objective was to simplify the script for print and typewriting technology of that time, by reducing the number of glyphs required. In 1967, the government appointed a committee headed by Sooranad Kunjan Pillai, who was the editor of the Malayalam Lexicon project. It reduced the number of glyphs required for Malayalam printing from around 1000 to around 250. Above committee's recommendations were further modified by another committee in 1969.

This proposal was later accepted by major newspapers in January 1971. The reformed script came into effect on 15 April 1971 (the Kerala New Year), by a government order released on 23 March 1971.

==== Recommendations by the committees ====
===== 1. Use non-ligating vowel signs for u, ū, and r̥ =====
In the traditional orthography that had been taught in the primary education system before the reforms, any consonant or consonant ligature followed by the vowel sign u, ū, or r̥ were represented by a cursive consonant-vowel ligature. The glyph of each consonant had its own way of ligating with these vowel signs. This irregularity was simplified in the reformed script. Thus, a vowel sign or consonant sign would always have a disconnected symbol that did not fuse with the base consonant.

Examples:

- ku → കു
- kū → കൂ
- kr̥ → കൃ
- nu → നു
- śu → ശു

===== 2. Split uncommon conjuncts with Chandrakkala =====
Also, most of traditional consonant-consonant ligatures, especially the less common ones only used to write words of Sanskrit origin, were split into non-ligated forms with explicit chandrakkala. For example:

- ഗ് g + ദ da → gda ഗ്‌ദ
- ല്‌ l + ത ta → lta ല്‌ത
- ശ് ś + ന na → śna ശ്‌ന
- ശ് ś + മ ma → śma ശ്‌മ
1. The ligature (ശ്മ) śma is required as an additional letter. For examples, ശ്മശാനം, śmaśanam, is the word for cemetery.

===== 3. Use non-ligating sign for conjoining ra =====
Any consonant or consonant ligature followed by the conjoining ra is represented by a cursive tail attached to the consonant or the consonant-ligature. In the reformed script, this consonant sign would be disconnected from the base and represented as a left-bracket like symbol placed on the left side of the cluster.

- kra → ക‌്ര
- kru → ക‌്ര‌ു

==== Current status ====
Today the reformed orthography, is commonly called put̪iya lipi (Malayalam: പുതിയ ലിപി) and traditional system, pazhaya lipi (Malayalam: പഴയ ലിപി). Current print media almost entirely uses reformed orthography. The state-run primary education introduces the Malayalam writing to the pupils in reformed script only and the books are printed accordingly. However, the digital media uses both traditional and reformed in almost equal proportions as the fonts for both the orthographies are commonly available.

== Letters ==
The basic characters can be classified as follows:

- Vowels (സ്വരം, svaram)
  1. Independent vowel letters
  2. Dependent vowel signs (സ്വരചിഹ്നം,svarachinnam)
- Consonant letters (വ്യഞ്ജനം, vyañjanam)

An independent vowel letter is used as the first letter of a word that begins with a vowel. A consonant letter, despite its name, does not represent a pure consonant, but represents a consonant + a short vowel /a/ by default. For example, ക is the first consonant letter of the Malayalam alphabet, which represents /ka/, not a simple /k/. A vowel sign is a diacritic attached to a consonant letter to indicate that the consonant is followed by a vowel other than /a/. If the following vowel is /a/, no vowel sign is needed. The phoneme /a/ that follows a consonant by default is called an inherent vowel. In Malayalam, its phonetic value is unrounded [ɐ], or [ə] as an allophone. To denote a pure consonant sound not followed by a vowel, a special diacritic virama is used to cancel the inherent vowel. The following are examples where a consonant letter is used with or without a diacritic.

- ക് /k/ = /k/ which is a consonant sound
- ക ka = ക് /k/ + അ vowel sign a
- കി ki = ക് /k/ + ഇ vowel sign i
- കു ku = ക് /k/ + ഉ vowel sign u
- കൈ kai = ക് /k/ + ഐ vowel sign ai

Malayalam alphabet is unicase, or does not have a case distinction. It is written from left to right, but certain vowel signs are attached to the left (the opposite direction) of a consonant letter that it logically follows. In the word കേരളം (Kēraḷam), the vowel sign േ (ē) visually appears in the leftmost position, though the vowel ē logically follows the consonant k.

=== Vowel letters and signs ===
The following tables show the independent vowel letters and the corresponding dependent vowel signs (diacritics) of the Malayalam script, with romanizations in ISO 15919, transcriptions in the International Phonetic Alphabet (IPA).

Monophthongs
	Short			Long		
	Independent	Dependent		Indep.	Dependent	
	Independent	Vowel sign	Example	Indep.	Vowel sign	Example
a	അ **a** /a/	(none)	പ **pa** /pa/	ആ **ā** /aː/	ാ	പാ **pā** /paː/
i	ഇ **i** /i/	ി	പി **pi** /pi/	ഈ **ī** /iː/	ീ	പീ **pī** /piː/
u	ഉ **u** /u/	ു	പു **pu** /pu/	ഊ **ū** /uː/	ൂ	പൂ **pū** /puː/
r̥	ഋ **r̥** /rɨ/	ൃ	പൃ **pr̥** /prɨ/	ൠ **r̥̄** /rɨː/	ൄ	പൄ **pr̥̄** /prɨː/
l̥	ഌ **l̥** /lɨ/	ൢ	പൢ **pl̥** /plɨ/	ൡ **l̥̄** /lɨː/	ൣ	പൣ **pl̥̄** /plɨː/
e	എ **e** /e/	െ	പെ **pe** /pe/	ഏ **ē** /eː/	േ	പേ **pē** /peː/
o	ഒ **o** /o/	ൊ	പൊ **po** /po/	ഓ **ō** /oː/	ോ	പോ **pō** /poː/

r̥, r̥̄, l̥, l̥̄, used to write Sanskrit words, are treated as vowels. They are called semi-vowels and are phonetically closer to vowels in Malayalam and in Classical Sanskrit where Panini, the Sanskrit grammarian, groups them with vowel sounds in his sutras. (see Proto-Indo-European language and Vedic Sanskrit). The letters and signs for r̥̄, l̥, l̥̄ are very rare, and are not considered as part of the modern orthography.

The vowel signs ā, i, ī are placed to the right of a consonant letter to which it is attached. The vowel signs e, ē, ai are placed to the left of a consonant letter. The vowel signs o and ō consist of two parts: the first part goes to the left of a consonant letter and the second part goes to the right of it. In the reformed orthography, the vowel signs u, ū, r̥ are simply placed to the right of the consonant letter, while they often make consonant-vowel ligatures in the traditional orthography.

Diphthongs
	Independent	Dependent	
	Independent	Vowel sign	Example
ai	ഐ **ai** /ai̯/	ൈ	പൈ **pai** /pai̯/
au	ഔ **au** /au̯/	ൌ (archaic)	പൌ **pau** /pau̯/
au	ഔ **au** /au̯/	ൗ (modern)	പൗ **pau** /pau̯/

The vowel duration as it can be used to differentiate words that would otherwise be the same. For example, /kalam/ means "earthenware pot" while /kaːlam/ means "time" or "season".

==== Anusvaram ====
Anusvaram
	Example with അ	Sign	Example with consonant
aṁ	അം **aṁ** /am/	ം m̐ /m/	പം **paṁ** /pam/

The anusvara originally denoted the nasalization where the preceding vowel was changed into a nasalised vowel, and hence is traditionally treated as a kind of vowel sign. In the Malayalam script, however, the anusvāram (Malayalam: അനുസ്വാരം, /ɐnusʋäːɾɐm/), which is written as a single dot (ം), represents the consonant sound /m/ after a vowel, though this /m/ can assimilate to another consonant. It is defined as a special character that, unlike a normal consonant, is never followed by an inherent vowel. In general, an anusvara at the final position of a word in an Indian language is transliterated as ṁ in ISO 15919, but a Malayalam anusvara at the final position of a word is transliterated as m, without a dot.

==== Visargam ====
Visargam
	Example with അ	Sign	Example with consonant
aḥ	അഃ **aḥ** /ah/	ഃ **ḥ** /h/	പഃ **paḥ** /pah/

A visargam (വിസർഗം, visargam) or visarga represents a consonant /h/ after a vowel, and is transliterated as ḥ. Like the anusvara, it is a special symbol, and is never followed by an inherent vowel or another vowel.

Malayalam vowel signs combined with letter ക (ka)

=== Consonants ===
==== Basic consonant letters ====
The following tables show the basic consonant letters of the Malayalam script, with romanizations in ISO 15919 in bold, transcriptions in IPA, and Unicode character names in monospaced block capitals. The character names used in the report of the Government of Kerala committee (2001) are shown in lowercase italics when different from Unicode character names. Those alternative names are based on the traditional romanization used by the Malayali people. For example, tha in "Thiruvananthapuram" is neither ISO tha nor Unicode THA, but tha in this sense (ത). The ISCII (IS 13194:1991) character names are given in parentheses when different from the above.

Varga consonants
	Voiceless		Voiced		
	Unaspirated	Aspirated	Unaspirated	Aspirated	Nasal
Velar	ക ka IPA: /ka/ KA	ഖ kha IPA: /kʰa/ KHA	ഗ ga IPA: /ɡa/ GA	ഘ gha IPA: /ɡʱa/ GHA	ങ ṅa IPA: /ŋa/ NGA
Postalveolar or Alveolo-palatal	ച ca IPA: /t͡ʃa/ CHA	ഛ cha IPA: /t͡ʃʰa/ CHHA	ജ ja IPA: /d͡ʒa/ JA	ഝ jha IPA: /d͡ʒʱa/ JHA	ഞ ña IPA: /ɲa/ NHA (nja)
Retroflex	ട ṭa IPA: /ʈa/ TTA (hard ta)	ഠ ṭha IPA: /ʈʰa/ TTHA (hard tha)	ഡ ḍa IPA: /ɖa/ DDA (hard da)	ഢ ḍha IPA: /ɖʱa/ DDHA (hard dha)	ണ ṇa IPA: /ɳa/ NNA (hard na)
Dental	ത ta IPA: /t̪a/ TA (soft ta)	ഥ tha IPA: /t̪ʰa/ THA (soft tha)	ദ da IPA: /d̪a/ DA (soft da)	ധ dha IPA: /d̪ʱa/ DHA (soft dha)	ന na IPA: /n̪a, na/ NA (soft na)
Labial	പ pa IPA: /pa/ PA	ഫ pha IPA: /pʰa/ PHA	ബ ba IPA: /ba/ BA	ഭ bha IPA: /bʱa/ BHA	മ ma IPA: /ma/ MA

Other consonants
യ ya IPA: /ja/ YA	ര ra IPA: /ɾa/ RA	ല la IPA: /la/ LA	വ va IPA: /ʋa/ VA

ശ śa IPA: /ɕa/ SHA	ഷ ṣa IPA: /ʂa/ SSA	സ sa IPA: /sa/ SA	ഹ ha IPA: /ha/ HA

ള ḷa IPA: /ɭa/ LLA	ഴ ḻa IPA: /ɻa/ LLLA	റ ṟa IPA: /ra, ta/ RRA (Note: (1) Repetition of this letter (റ + റ) represents a geminated voiceless alveolar plosive, /tːa/, it can also occur initially in loans where it can not be geminated; (2) chillu-n + this letter (ൻ + റ) often represents [nda]; (3) otherwise alveolar trill (apical) /ra/.)	ഩ ṉa IPA: /na/ NNNA (Note: Corresponds to Tamil ṉa ன. Used rarely in scholarly texts to represent the alveolar nasal, as opposed to the dental nasal. In ordinary texts both are represented by na ന.)	ഺ ṯa IPA: /ta/ TTTA (Note: Used rarely in scholarly texts to represent the voiceless alveolar plosive, as opposed to the voiceless dental plosive represented by ta ത. In ordinary texts this sound is represented by ṟṟa റ്റ.)

==== Chillus ====
A chillu, or a chillaksharam (ചില്ലക്ഷരം, cillakṣaram), is a special consonant letter that represents a pure consonant independently, without help of a virama. Unlike a consonant represented by an ordinary consonant letter, this consonant is never followed by an inherent vowel. Anusvara and visarga fit this definition but are not usually included. ISCII and Unicode 5.0 treat a chillu as a glyph variant of a normal ("base") consonant letter. In Unicode 5.1 and later, however, chillu letters are treated as independent characters, encoded atomically.

Six independent chillu letters (0D7A..0D7F) had been encoded in Unicode 5.1., three additional chillu letters (0D54..0D56) were encoded with the publication of Unicode 9.0.

Chillu letters
Letter	Unicode name	Base	Remarks	Examples
ൺ	CHILLU NN	ṇa **ണ**		കൂൺ (kūṇ, "mushroom")
ൻ	CHILLU N	ṉa **ഩ**	Chillu of alveolar nasal ṉa.	അവൻ (avaṉ, "he")
ർ	CHILLU RR	ṟa **റ**	Historically stood for ra ര, not ṟa റ.	അവർ (avar̠, "they")
ൽ	CHILLU L	la **ല**	In Sanskrit texts, this stands for final ta ത.	ഒടുവിൽ (oṭuvil, "finally"), തൽ (tat, Sanskrit "that")
ൾ	CHILLU LL	ḷa **ള**		അവൾ (avaḷ, "she")
ൿ	CHILLU K	ka **ക**	Not in modern use	വാൿചാതുരി (vākcāturi, "fluency"), പൃഥൿ, (pr̥thak, Sanskrit "each")
ൔ	CHILLU M	ma **മ**	Not in modern use	
ൕ	CHILLU Y	ya **യ**	Not in modern use	
ൖ	CHILLU LLL	ḻa **ഴ**	Not in modern use	

=== Chandrakkala ===
The virama in Malayalam is called candrakkala (chandrakkala). It has two functions: (Note: Srinidhi A and Sridatta A made comments on the proposals of Cibu Johny et al.)

- As virama: used to suppress the inherent vowel
- As samvruthokaram: represent the "half-u" sound /ə̆/

==== As virama ====
Chandrakkala ് (ചന്ദ്രക്കല, candrakkala) is a diacritic attached to a consonant letter to show that the consonant is not followed by an inherent vowel or any other vowel (for example, ക ka → ക് k). This kind of diacritic is common in Indic scripts, generically called virama in Sanskrit, or halant in Hindi.

==== Half-u ====
At the end of a word, the same symbol sometimes represents a very short vowel, known as "half-u", or "samvruthokaram" (സംവൃതോകാരം, saṁvr̥tōkāram), or kuṟṟiyal ukaram (കുറ്റിയൽ ഉകരം). The exact pronunciation of this vowel varies from dialect to dialect, but it is approximately [ɯ̽] or [ɨ], and transliterated as ŭ (for example, ന na → ന് nŭ). Optionally, a vowel sign u is inserted, as in നു് (= ന + ു + ്). According to one author, this alternative form is historically more correct, though the simplified form without a vowel sign u is common nowadays. This means that the same spelling ന് may represent either n or nŭ depending on the context. Generally, it is nŭ at the end of a word, and n elsewhere; നു് always represents nŭ.

The virama of Tigalari script behave similarly to Malayalam. Virama has three functions: to suppress the inherent vowel (as the halant of Devanagari); to form conjunct consonants; to represent the half-u. Devanagari supports half-u for Kashmiri; for example നു് is written as नॖ.

=== Ligatures ===
==== Consonant ligatures ====
Like in other Indic scripts, a virama is used in the Malayalam script to cancel—or "kill"—the inherent vowel of a consonant letter and represent a consonant without a vowel, so-called a "dead" consonant. For example,

1. ന is a consonant letter na,
2. ് is a virama; therefore,
3. ന്‌ (na + virama) represents a dead consonant n.

If this n ന്‌ is further followed by another consonant letter, for example, ma മ, the result may look like ന്‌മ, which represents nma as na + virama + ma. In this case, two elements n ന്‌ and ma മ are simply placed one by one, side by side. Alternatively, nma can be also written as a ligature ന്മ.

Generally, when a dead consonant letter C_{1} and another consonant letter C_{2} are conjoined, the result may be either:

1. A fully conjoined ligature of C_{1}+C_{2};
2. Half-conjoined—
  - C_{1}-conjoining: a modified form (half form) of C_{1} attached to the original form (full form) of C_{2}
  - C_{2}-conjoining: a modified form of C_{2} attached to the full form of C_{1}; or
3. Non-ligated: full forms of C_{1} and C_{2} with a visible virama.

If the result is fully or half-conjoined, the (conceptual) virama which made C_{1} dead becomes invisible, only logically existing in a character encoding scheme such as Unicode. If the result is non-ligated, a virama is visible, attached to C_{1}. The glyphs for nma has a visible virama if not ligated (ന്‌മ), but if ligated, the virama disappears (ന്മ). Usually the difference between those forms is superficial and both are semantically identical, just like the meaning of the English word palaeography does not change even if it is spelled palæography, with the ligature æ.

===== Common consonant ligatures =====
Several consonant ligatures are used commonly even in the post-1971 orthography.

Common ligatures
	kka	ṅka	ṅṅa	cca	ñca	ñña	ṭṭa	ṇṭa	ṇṇa	tta	nta	nna	ppa	mpa	mma
Non-ligated	ക്‌ക	ങ്‌ക	ങ്‌ങ	ച്‌ച	ഞ്‌ച	ഞ്‌ഞ	ട്‌ട	ണ്‌ട	ണ്‌ണ	ത്‌ത	ന്‌ത	ന്‌ന	പ്‌പ	മ്‌പ	മ്‌മ
Ligated	ക്ക	ങ്ക	ങ്ങ	ച്ച	ഞ്ച	ഞ്ഞ	ട്ട	ണ്ട	ണ്ണ	ത്ത	ന്ത	ന്ന	പ്പ	മ്പ	മ്മ

The ligature mpa മ്പ was historically derived from npa ന്‌പ. The ligatures cca, bba, yya, and vva are special in that a doubled consonant is denoted by a triangle sign below a consonant letter.

	cca	bba	yya	vva
Non-ligated	ച്‌ച	ബ്‌ബ	യ്‌യ	വ്‌വ
Ligated	ച്ച	ബ്ബ	യ്യ	വ്വ

====== Consonant + ya, va, la, ra ======
The consonant letter ya is generally C_{2}-conjoining after a consonant in both orthographies. For example,

- k ക് + ya യ = kya ക്യ
- p പ് + ya യ = pya പ്യ

In kya ക്യ, a variant form of ya (്യ) is placed after the full form of ka ക, just like ki കി is written ka ക followed by the vowel sign i ി. In other words, the variant form of ya (്യ) used after a consonant letter can be considered as a diacritic. Since it is placed after the base character, it is sometimes referred to as a post-base form. An exception is yya യ്യ (see above).

Similarly, va (്വ) after a consonant takes a post-base form:

- k ക് + va വ = kva ക്വ
- p പ് + va വ = pva പ്വ

An exception is vva വ്വ (see above).

The consonant letter la (്ല) after a consonant traditionally takes a below-base form. These forms are used also in the new orthography, though some fonts do not support them.

- k ക് + la ല = kla ക്ല
- p പ് + la ല = pla പ്ല
- l ല് + la ല = lla ല്ല

A consonant letter ra (്ര) after a consonant usually takes a pre-base form in the reformed orthography, while this combination makes a fully conjoined ligature in the traditional orthography.

- k ക് + ra ര = kra ക്ര
- p പ് + ra ര = pra പ്ര

====== nṯa and ṯṯa ======
The ligature nṯa is written as n ന്‌ + ṟa റ and pronounced /nda/. The ligature ṯṯa is written as ṟ റ് + ṟa റ.

	nṯa	ṯṯa
Non-ligated	ന്‌റ	റ്‌റ
Ligated	ന്റ	റ്റ
Digraph	ൻറ	ററ

In those two ligatures, a small ṟa ‌റ is written below the first letter (chillu-n if it is a dead n). Alternatively, the letter ṟa is sometimes written to the right of the first letter, making a digraph (just like ωι used instead of ῳ in Greek). The spelling ൻറ is therefore read either nṟa (two separate letters) or nṯa (digraph) depending on the word like in എൻറോൾ (en̠r̠ōḷ) 'enroll' or ഹെൻറി (hen̠r̠i) 'Henry' but ന്റ is always read nṯa. Similarly, ‌റ‌റ is read either ṟaṟa or ṯṯa.

==== Traditional orthography ====
===== Dot reph =====
In the pre-1971 orthography, a dead consonant r before a consonant sometimes takes an above-base form, known as a dot reph, which looks like a short vertical line or a dot. Generally, a chillu-r is used instead of a dot reph in the reformed orthography.

- r ര് + ga ഗ = rga ൎഗ (Reformed: ർഗ)
- r ര് + ja ജ = rja ൎജ (Reformed: ർജ)

===== Consonant ligatures =====
Although there are consonant ligatures used even now, like ന്ത and ണ്ട, almost all consonant clusters were written as ligatures before 1971. Most of the time, the second consonant was written to the bottom right of the first consonant. For example, in consonant + r clusters, the ്ര was historically attached to the main consonant; now it is detached and placed to the left.

===== Consonant-vowel ligatures =====
In the pre-1971 orthography, consonant + the vowels u, ū, r̥ were written as ligatures, post-1971 they are written with symbols after the letter. They can be still seen in old signs and used by people who learned to write before 1971.

r̥̄ l̥ l̥̄ (which are not part of modern orthography) were also written as ligatures but there were not any words with l̥̄ even in Sanskrit; r̥̄ was only used grammatically instead of r̥ in Sanskrit so it was not used either; there is only one root with l̥ in Sanskrit कॢप्त which was loaned into Malayalam as കൢപ്തം.

=== Archaic signs ===
==== ഺ ====
ഺ was made by A. R. Raja Raja Varma and it was not used as a single letter; in his orthography റ്റ (ṯṯ) was written as ഺ്ഺ and ന്റ (ṉḏ) as ഩ്ഺ.

==== Archaic viramas ====
Before chandrakkala was made, there were two other viramas used simultaneously, the vertical bar virama ഻ and circular virama ഼. The vertical bar virama was used exclusively for loanwords and circular virama just for native words. Before the vertical bar virama used to cut through the main consonant and it led to the creation of the chillu letters. It was sometimes confused with the dot reph ൎ since they look similar but both of them are used for different purposes (see above for dot reph).

==== Chandrabindu ====
ഁ was like the chandrabindu from other scripts and was used to nasalise the vowel; it was only used for writing Sanskrit and Prakrits. It is archaic.

==== Other anusvaras ====
ഄ was used like the Devanagari ꣳ and contrasts with the normal anusvara. ഀ was not really used in Malayalam but was used in the Grantha script; in it the normal anusvara ം represents gemination of the next consonant and this anusvara represents an actual linguistic anusvara. Both are archaic.

== Numeral system ==
The Malayalam numeral system is archaic and no longer commonly used. Instead, the common Hindu-Arabic numeral system is followed.

Malayalam numerals
0	1	2	3	4	5	6	7	8	9	10	100	1000	1/4	1/2	3/4
൦	൧	൨	൩	൪	൫	൬	൭	൮	൯	൰	൱	൲	൳	൴	൵

In the Malayalam numeral system, "11" is written as "൰൧" and not "൧൧" and "32" is written as "൩൰൨", similar to the Tamil numeral system.

11	20	21	30	110	10,099
൰൧	൨൰	൨൰൧	൩൰	൱൰	൰൲൯൰൯

Suppose the number is "2013". It is read in Malayalam as "രണ്ടായിരത്തി പതിമൂന്ന്" (raṇḍāyiratti padimūnnu). It is split into :

- രണ്ട് (raṇḍŭ) : 2 - ൨
- ആയിരം (āyiram) : 1000 - ൲
- പത്ത് (pattŭ) : 10 - ൰
- മൂന്ന് (mūnnŭ) : 3 - ൩

Combine them together to get the Malayalam number "൨൲൰൩".

=== Other symbols ===
Praslesham ഽ
Corresponds to Devanagari avagraha, used when a Sanskrit phrase containing an avagraha is written in Malayalam script. The symbol indicates the elision of the word-initial vowel a after a word that ends in ā, ē, or ō, and is transliterated as an apostrophe ('), or sometimes as a colon + an apostrophe (:').
(Malayalam: പ്രശ്ലേഷം, praślēṣam)
Malayalam date mark ൹
Used in an abbreviation of a date.
Danda ।
Double danda ॥
Archaic punctuation marks used as full stops or for delimiting verses.

== Sample text ==
The following text is Article 1 of the Universal Declaration of Human Rights.

=== English ===
All human beings are born free and equal in dignity and rights. They are endowed with reason and conscience and should act towards one another in a spirit of brotherhood.

=== Malayalam ===
മനുഷ്യരെല്ലാവരും തുല്യാവകാശങ്ങളോടും അന്തസ്സോടും സ്വാതന്ത്ര്യത്തോടും കൂടി ജനിച്ചിട്ടുള്ളവരാണ്‌. അന്യോന്യം ഭ്രാതൃഭാവത്തോടെ പെരുമാറുവാനാണ്‌ മനുഷ്യന് വിവേകബുദ്ധിയും മനസാക്ഷിയും സിദ്ധമായിരിക്കുന്നത്‌.

=== Romanisation (ISO 15919) ===
man̠uṣyarellāvaruṁ tulyāvakāśaṅṅaḷōṭuṁ antassōṭuṁ svātantryattōṭuṅkūṭi jan̠icciṭṭuḷḷavarāṇ‌ŭ. an̠yōn̠yaṁ bhrātr̥bhāvattōṭe perumāṟuvān̠āṇ‌ŭ man̠uṣyan̠ŭ vivēkabuddhiyuṁ man̠asākṣiyuṁ siddhamāyirikkunnat‌ŭ.

=== IPA ===
/manuʂjaɾelːaːʋaɾum t̪uljaːʋakaːʃaŋːaɭoːʈum an̪t̪asːoːʈum sʋaːt̪an̪tɾjat̪ːoːʈuŋkuːʈi d͡ʒanit͡ʃːiʈːuɭːaʋaɾaːɳɨ̆ ǁ anjoːnjam bʱraːt̪rɨ̆bʱaːʋat̪ːoːʈe peɾumaːruʋaːnaːɳɨ̆ manuʂjanɨ̆ ʋiʋeːkabud̪ːʱijum manasaːkʂijum sid̪ːʱamaːjiɾikːun̪ːat̪ɨ̆ ǁ/

== Unicode ==
The Malayalam script was added to the Unicode Standard in October 1991 with the release of version 1.0.

=== Block ===
The Unicode block for Malayalam is U+0D00–U+0D7F:

Malayalam^{[1]}^{[2]} Official Unicode Consortium code chart (PDF)
	0	1	2	3	4	5	6	7	8	9	A	B	C	D	E	F
U+0D0x	ഀ	ഁ	ം	ഃ	ഄ	അ	ആ	ഇ	ഈ	ഉ	ഊ	ഋ	ഌ		എ	ഏ
U+0D1x	ഐ		ഒ	ഓ	ഔ	ക	ഖ	ഗ	ഘ	ങ	ച	ഛ	ജ	ഝ	ഞ	ട
U+0D2x	ഠ	ഡ	ഢ	ണ	ത	ഥ	ദ	ധ	ന	ഩ	പ	ഫ	ബ	ഭ	മ	യ
U+0D3x	ര	റ	ല	ള	ഴ	വ	ശ	ഷ	സ	ഹ	ഺ	഻	഼	ഽ	ാ	ി
U+0D4x	ീ	ു	ൂ	ൃ	ൄ		െ	േ	ൈ		ൊ	ോ	ൌ	്	ൎ	൏
U+0D5x					ൔ	ൕ	ൖ	ൗ	൘	൙	൚	൛	൜	൝	൞	ൟ
U+0D6x	ൠ	ൡ	ൢ	ൣ			൦	൧	൨	൩	൪	൫	൬	൭	൮	൯
U+0D7x	൰	൱	൲	൳	൴	൵	൶	൷	൸	൹	ൺ	ൻ	ർ	ൽ	ൾ	ൿ
Notes 1.As of Unicode version 18.0 2.Grey areas indicate non-assigned code points

=== Chillus in Unicode ===
For example, avan അവൻ ("he") is written as a അ + va വ + chillu-n ൻ, where chillu-n represents the n sound without a vowel. In other Indic scripts, the same word would be possibly written as a + va + na + virama. However, in Malayalam script, that sequence represents a different word, avanŭ അവന്‌ ("to him"), and is not interchangeable with avan. This is because in modern Malayalam script, the sign for a virama also works as the sign for a vowel ŭ at the end of a word, and is not able to cleanly "kill" the inherent vowel in this case.

To differentiate a pure consonant (chillu) and a consonant with ŭ, zero-width joiner (ZWJ) and zero-width non-joiner (ZWNJ) were used before Unicode 5.1. However, this system was problematic. Among other things, glyph variants specified by ZWJ or ZWNJ are supposed to be non-semantic, whereas a chillu (expressed as letter + virama + ZWJ) and the same consonant followed by a ŭ (expressed as letter + virama + ZWNJ) are often semantically different. After a long debate, Nine chillu letters now have their own code points since Unicode 9.0 (though only 5 of them are used in modern Malayalam), though applications should also be prepared to handle data in the representation specified in Unicode 5.0. This means, fonts should display chillus in both sequences; while an input method should output standard chillus.

The ligature nṯa ന്റ is very common and supported by most Malayalam fonts in one way or another, but exactly how it should be encoded was not clear in Unicode 5.0 and earlier, and two incompatible implementations are currently in use. In Unicode 5.1 (2008), the sequence to represent it was explicitly redefined as chillu-n + virama + ṟa (ൻ്റ). ന്റ ligature is often considered to be the correct form to represent n̠d̠ as ൻറ can also represent n̠r̠ but in many computers it is only shown with ൻ + ് + റ even though a chandrakkala cannot be after a chillu letter, other computers show it with ന + ് + റ. Some computers display ൻ്റ (ൻ + ് + റ) and ന്റ (ന + ് + റ) differently.

== Image gallery ==
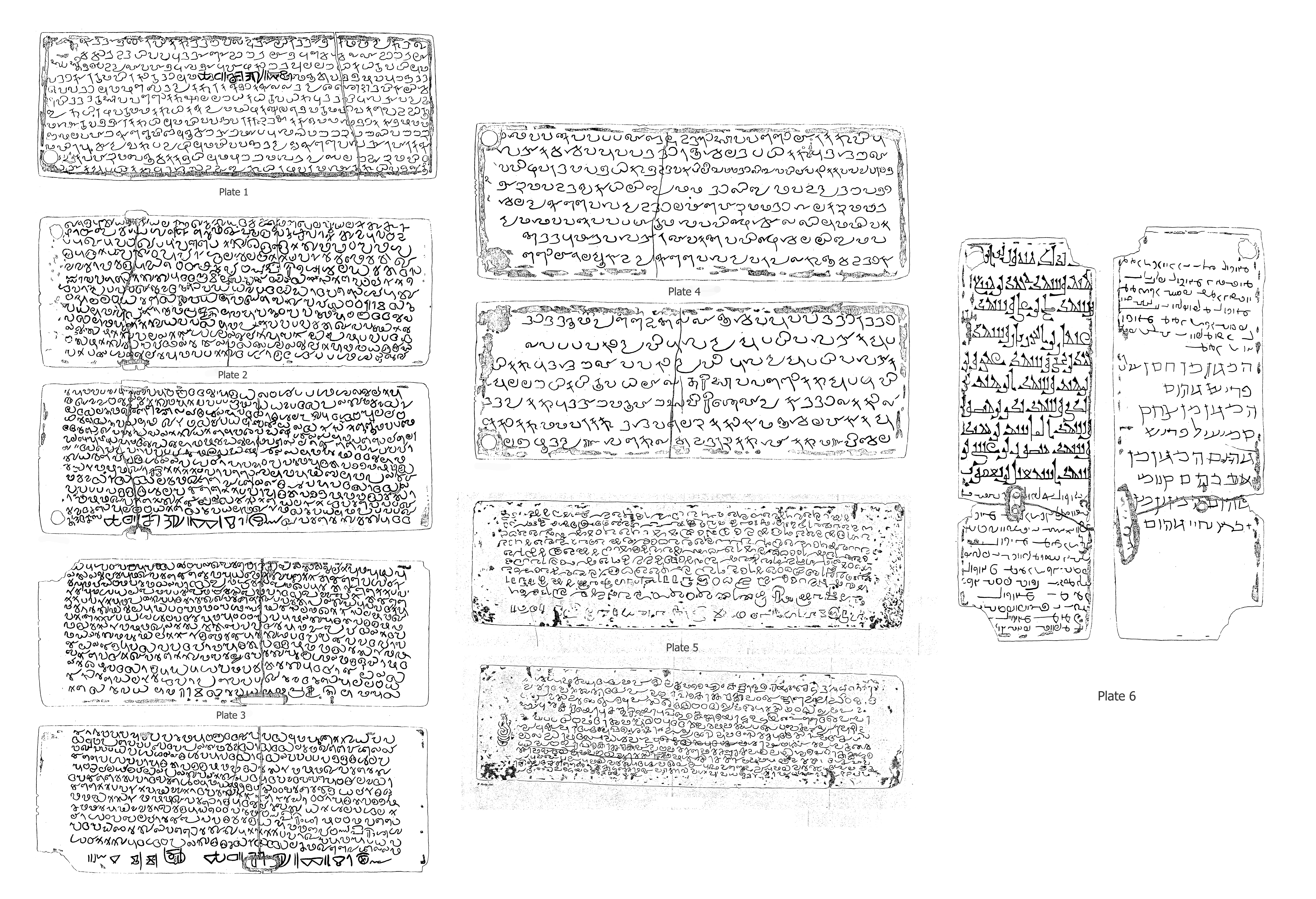
The Quilon Syrian copper plates (849/850 CE) is the available oldest inscription written in Old Malayalam. Besides Old Malayalam, the copper plate also contains signatures in Arabic (Kufic script), Middle Persian (cursive Pahlavi script) and Judeo-Persian (standard square Hebrew) scripts.

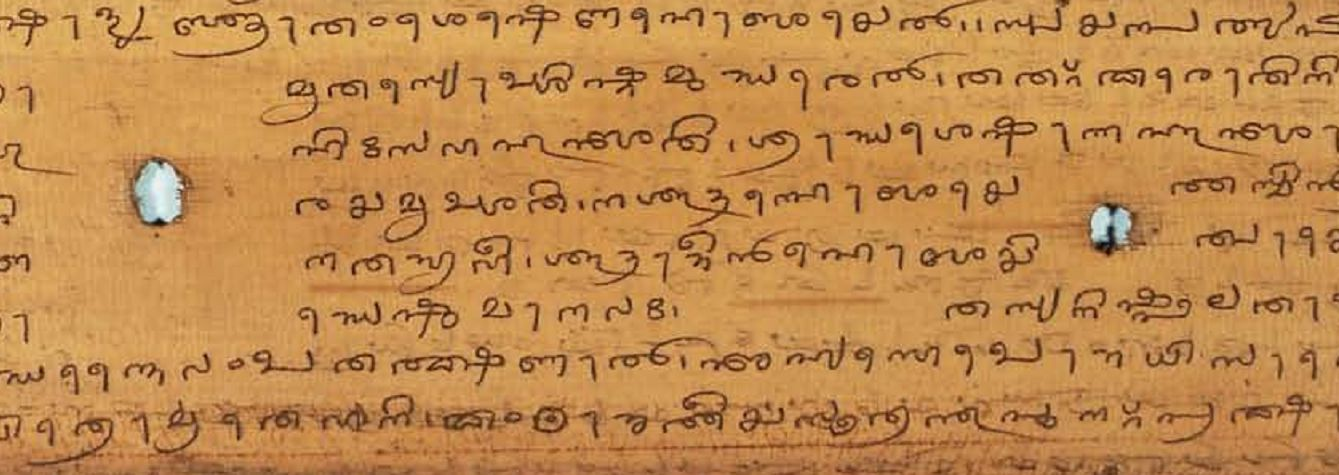
A medieval Tigalari manuscript (Bears high similarity with modern Malayalam script)

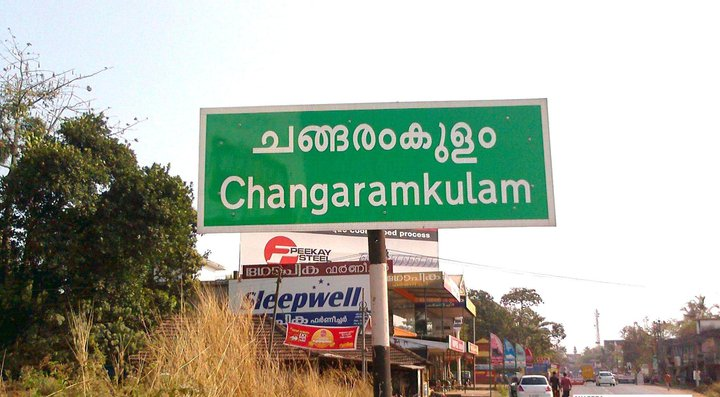
A bilingual sign in Malayalam and Latin script (English) at Changaramkulam, Malappuram, Kerala

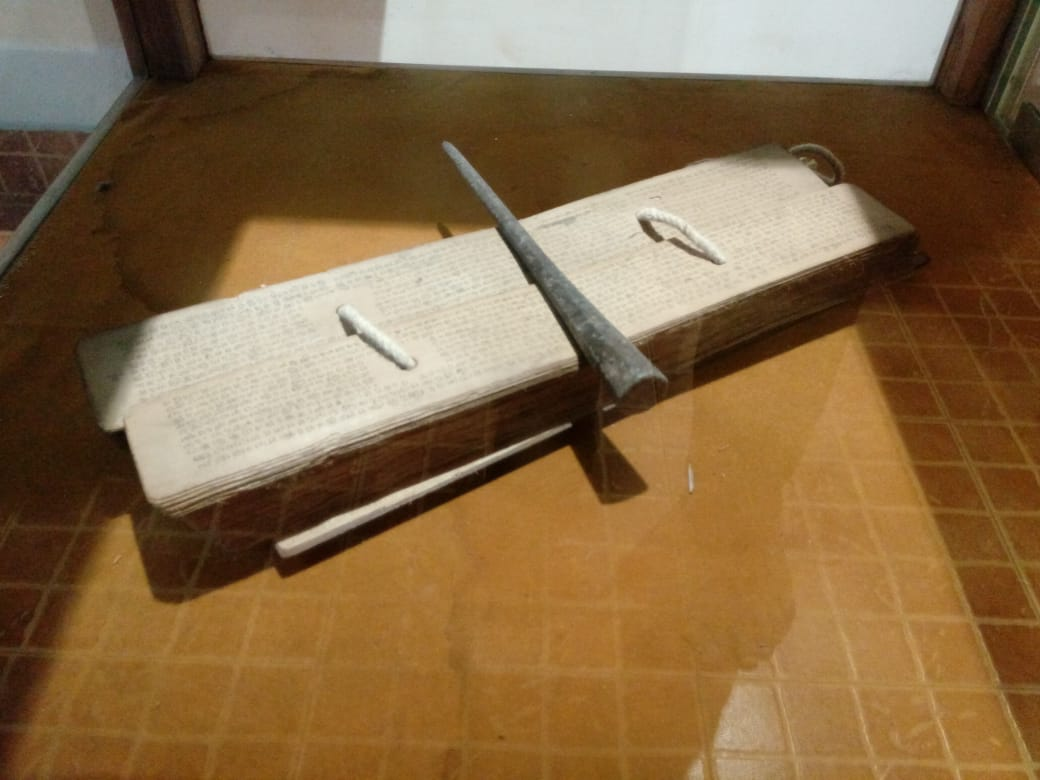
Copy of Thunchaththu Ezhuthachan's stylus and Adhyatma Ramayanam preserved at Thunchan Parambu, Tirur

The Thunchath Ezhuthachan Malayalam University is situated at Thunchan Parambu, Tirur, Malappuram

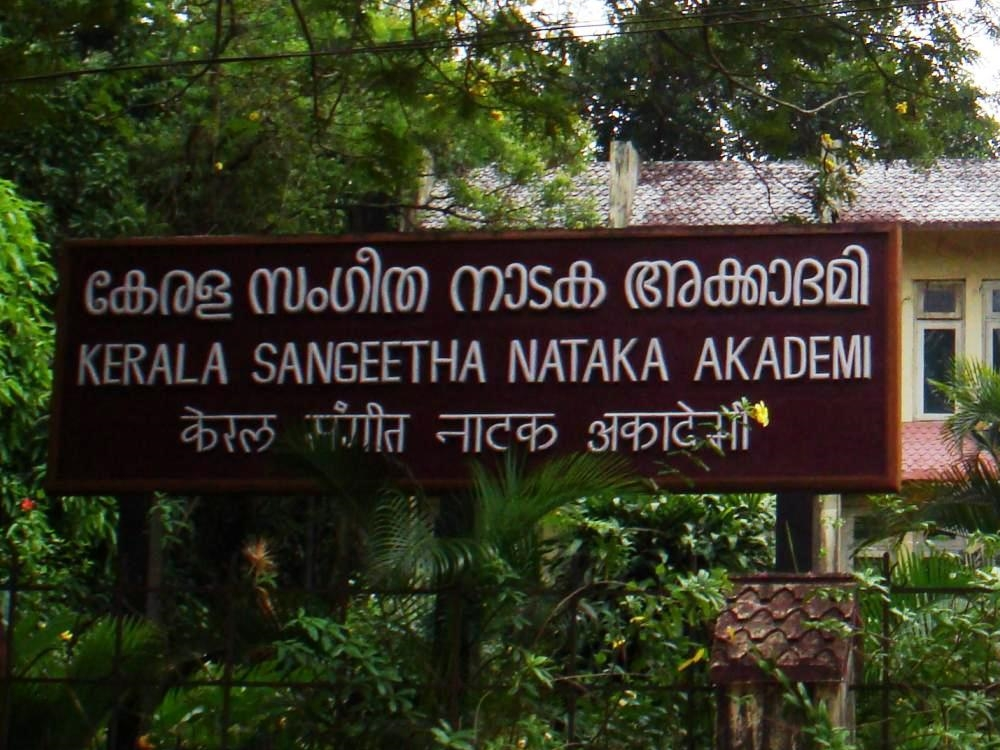
A Malayalam sign. Notice the word-initial a അ in akkādami, and the vowel sign ē േ in Kēraḷa

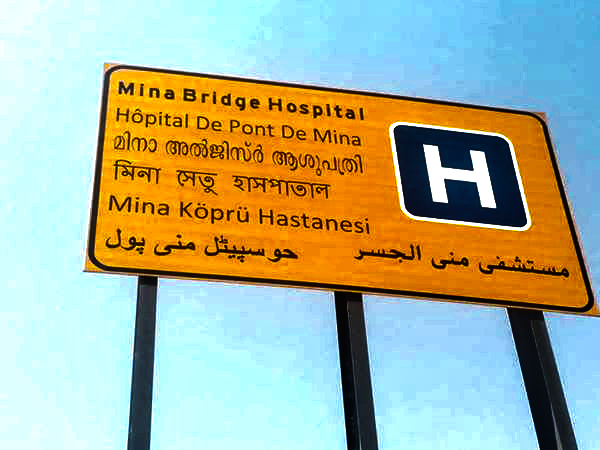
A signboard including Malayalam at Mina, Saudi Arabia

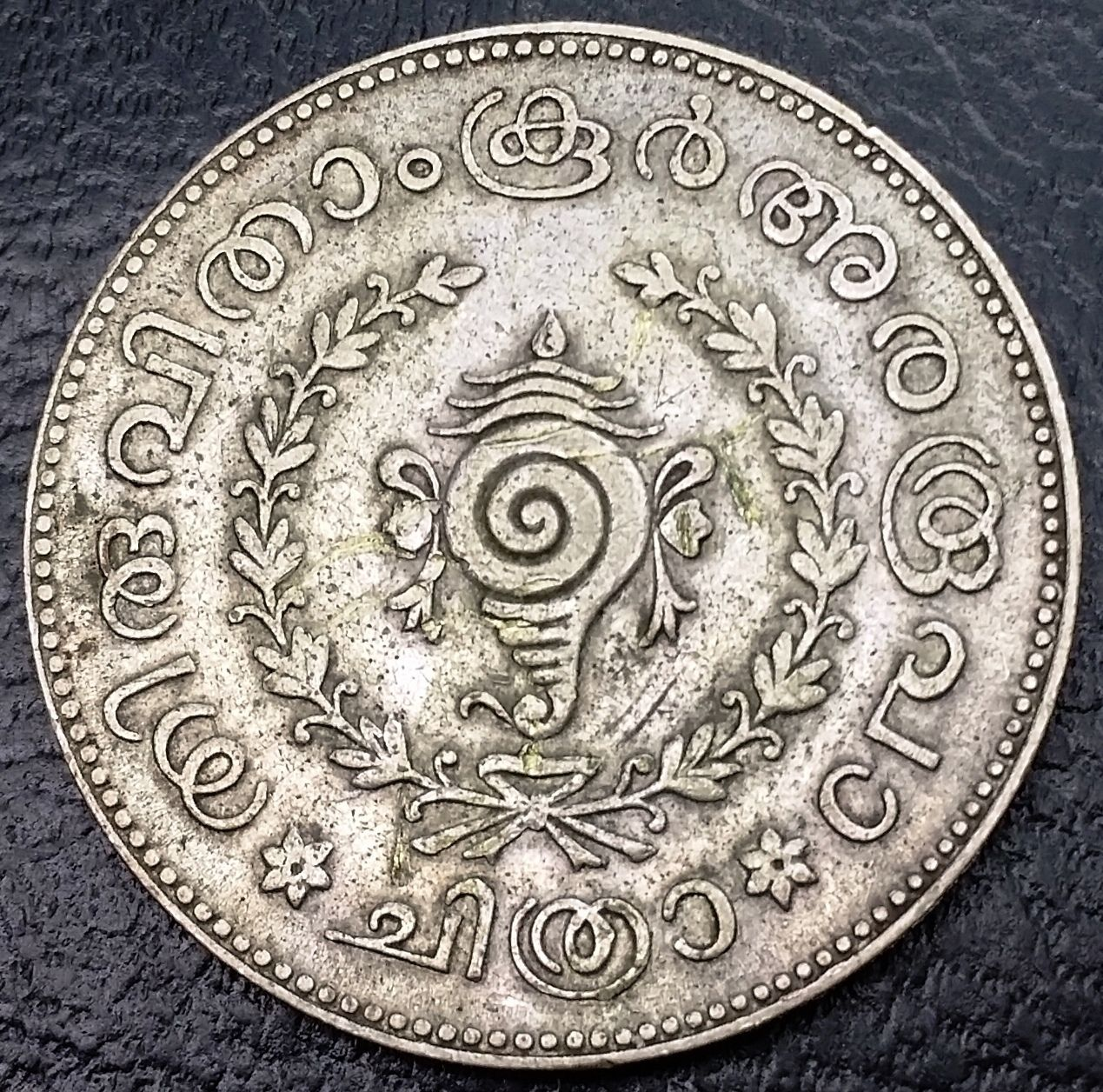
Malayalam letters on old Travancore Rupee coin

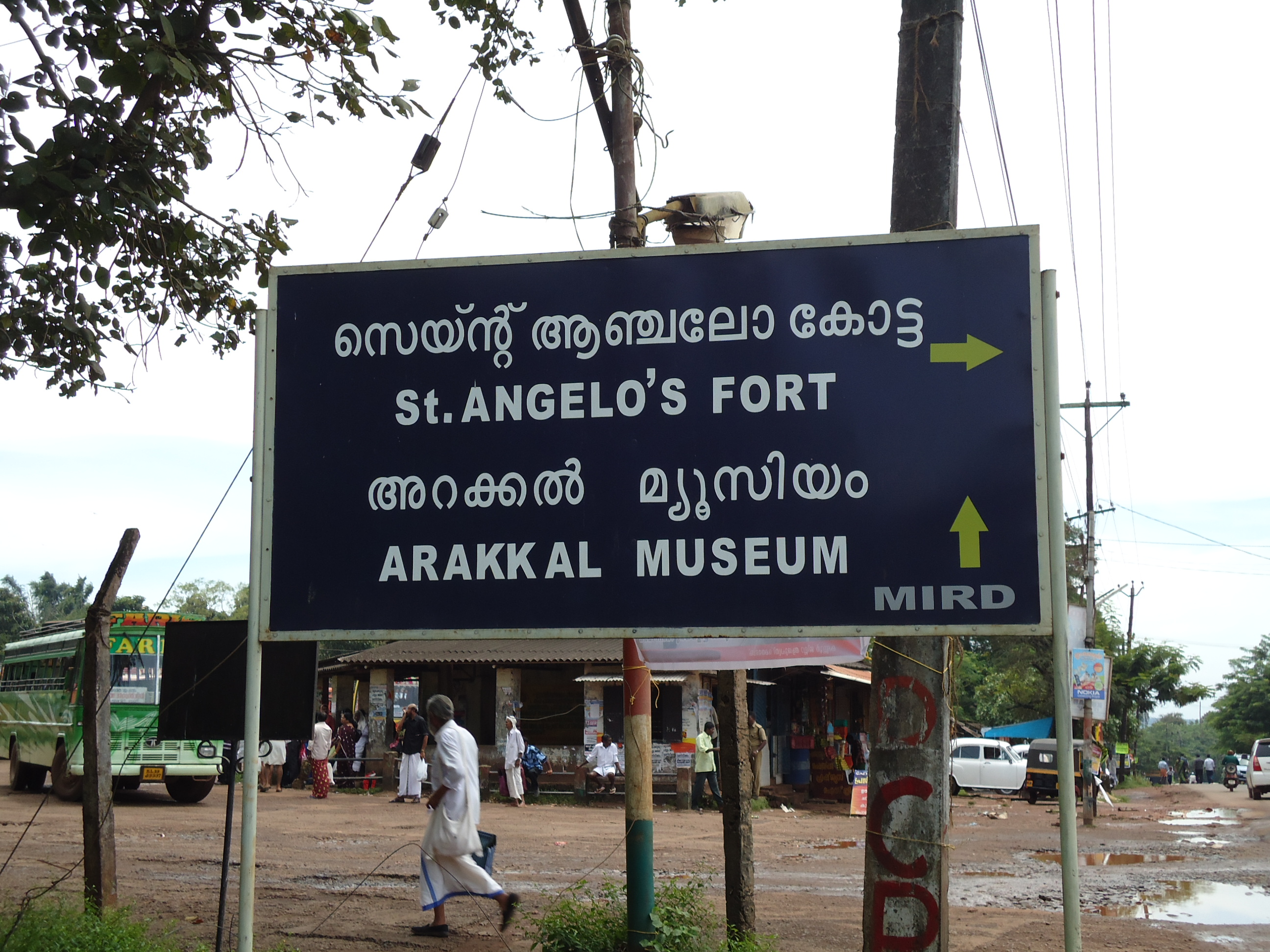
A Malayalam signboard from Kannur, Kerala. Malayalam is official language in the Indian state of Kerala and the union territories of Lakshadweep and Puduchery

== See also ==
- Arabi Malayalam script
- Coorgi–Cox alphabet
- Tigalari script
- Malabar script
- Malayalam Braille
- Mulabhadra
- Suriyani Malayalam
- Grantha script
- Sinhala script
- ISO 15919

== Sources ==
- Mohanan, K. P. (1996). "Malayalam Writing". In Daniels, Peter T. & Bright, William (eds.). The World's Writing Systems. New York: Oxford University Press.
- Burnell, Arthur Coke (1874). Elements of South-Indian Palæography from the Fourth to the Seventeenth Century A.D. Trübner & Co.
- Canepari, Luciano (2005). "19.29 Malayalam". A Handbook of Phonetics. LINCOM. ISBN 3-89586-480-3.
