= Daṇḍa =

Punctuation mark in Indic scripts

।o

Daṇḍa
- U+0964 । DEVANAGARI DANDA

In Indic scripts, the daṇḍa (Sanskrit: दण्ड daṇḍa "stick") (Note: Other terms used in various languages for variants of daṇḍa include kaan (or khan), shad (or shya), carik siki (doubled to carik pareren), ta-rol, mucaad, pada lingsa (doubled to pada lungsi) and section (mark).) is a punctuation mark. The grapheme consists of a single vertical stroke.

== Use ==
The daṇḍa marks the end of a sentence or line, comparable to a full stop (period) as commonly used in the Latin alphabet, and is used together with Western punctuation in Hindi and Nepali.

The daṇḍa and double daṇḍa are the only punctuation used in Sanskrit texts. No distinct punctuation is used to mark questions or exclamations, which must be inferred from other aspects of the sentence.

In metrical texts, a double daṇḍa is used to delimit verses, and a single daṇḍa to delimit a pada, line, or semi-verse. In prose, the double daṇḍa is used to mark the end of a paragraph, a story, or section.

== Computer encoding ==
Unicode encodes the daṇḍas as U+0964 । DEVANAGARI DANDA and U+0965 ॥ DEVANAGARI DOUBLE DANDA. The Unicode standard recommends using this character also in other Indic scripts, like Bengali, Telugu, Oriya, and others. Encoding it separately for every Indic script was proposed, but has not yet been accepted. (The graphemes for x0964 and x0965 can be implemented in a computer font with a glyph design that matches the conventional style for those languages.)

Daṇḍa and similar characters are encoded separately for some scripts in which its appearance or use is significantly different from the Devanagari one. These include forms with adornments, such as the Rgya Gram Shad.

ISCII encoded daṇḍa at 0xEA.

Below is a list of Unicode daṇḍas:

daṇḍa characters in Unicode
daṇḍa	double daṇḍa
U+0964 । DEVANAGARI DANDA	U+0965 ॥ DEVANAGARI DOUBLE DANDA
U+0E2F ฯ THAI CHARACTER PAIYANNOI	U+0E5A ๚ THAI CHARACTER ANGKHANKHU
U+104A ၊ MYANMAR SIGN LITTLE SECTION	U+104B ။ MYANMAR SIGN SECTION
U+17D4 ។ KHMER SIGN KHAN	U+17D5 ៕ KHMER SIGN BARIYOOSAN
U+1AA8 ᪨ TAI THAM SIGN KAAN	U+1AA9 ᪩ TAI THAM SIGN KAANKUU
U+1AAA ᪪ TAI THAM SIGN SATKAAN	U+1AAB ᪫ TAI THAM SIGN SATKAANKUU
U+A8CE ꣎ SAURASHTRA DANDA	U+A8CF ꣏ SAURASHTRA DOUBLE DANDA
U+AA5D ꩝ CHAM PUNCTUATION DANDA	U+AA5E ꩞ CHAM PUNCTUATION DOUBLE DANDA
U+AA5F ꩟ CHAM PUNCTUATION TRIPLE DANDA
U+10A56 𐩖 KHAROSHTHI PUNCTUATION DANDA	U+10A57 𐩗 KHAROSHTHI PUNCTUATION DOUBLE DANDA
U+11047 𑁇 BRAHMI DANDA	U+11048 𑁈 BRAHMI DOUBLE DANDA
U+110BE 𑂾 KAITHI SECTION MARK	U+110BF 𑂿 KAITHI DOUBLE SECTION MARK
U+110C0 𑃀 KAITHI DANDA	U+110C1 𑃁 KAITHI DOUBLE DANDA
U+11141 𑅁 CHAKMA DANDA	U+11142 𑅂 CHAKMA DOUBLE DANDA
U+111C5 𑇅 SHARADA DANDA	U+111C6 𑇆 SHARADA DOUBLE DANDA
U+11238 𑈸 KHOJKI DANDA	U+11239 𑈹 KHOJKI DOUBLE DANDA
U+1123B 𑈻 KHOJKI SECTION MARK	U+1123C 𑈼 KHOJKI DOUBLE SECTION MARK
U+1144B 𑑋 NEWA DANDA	U+1144C 𑑌 NEWA DOUBLE DANDA
U+115C2 𑗂 SIDDHAM DANDA	U+115C3 𑗃 SIDDHAM DOUBLE DANDA
U+11641 𑙁 MODI DANDA	U+11642 𑙂 MODI DOUBLE DANDA
U+1173C 𑜼 AHOM SIGN SMALL SECTION	U+1173D 𑜽 AHOM SIGN SECTION
	U+11944 𑥄 DIVES AKURU DOUBLE DANDA
U+11C41 𑱁 BHAIKSUKI DANDA	U+11C42 𑱂 BHAIKSUKI DOUBLE DANDA
U+16A6E 𖩮 MRO DANDA	U+16A6F 𖩯 MRO DOUBLE DANDA

== See also ==
- Vertical bar – Typographic symbol, |
- Pilcrow – Symbol (¶) to identify a paragraph, the latin character-set equivalent of the double daṇḍa
