= Virama =

Diacritic in many Brahmic scripts

Example glyphs
- Bengali–Assamese: ্
- Tibetan: ྄
- Thai: ฺ
- Malayalam: ്
- Sinhala: ්
- Ashoka Brahmi: 𑁆
- Devanagari: ्

Properties
- Phonemic representation: /-/
- IAST transliteration: -
- ISCII code point: E8 (232)

Virama (Sanskrit: विराम/हलन्त, romanized: virāma/halanta ्, IPA: [ʋiraːmɐ, ɦɐlɐn̪t̪ɐ] (see #Names for other terms) is a Sanskrit phonological concept to suppress the inherent vowel that otherwise occurs with every consonant letter, commonly used as a generic term for a codepoint in Unicode, representing either

1. halanta, hasanta or explicit virāma, a diacritic in many Brahmic scripts, including the Devanagari and Bengali scripts, or
2. saṃyuktākṣara (Sanskrit: संयुक्ताक्षर) or implicit virama, a conjunct consonant or ligature.

In Tamil phonology the pulli is modeled as a stop following the consonant. Unicode schemes of scripts writing Mainland Southeast Asia languages, such as that of Burmese script and of Tibetan script, generally do not group the two functions together.

== Names ==
The name is Sanskrit for "cessation, termination, end". As a Sanskrit word, it is used in place of several language-specific terms, such as:

| Name in English books | Language | In native language | Form | Notes |
|---|---|---|---|---|
| halant | Hindi | हलन्त, halant | ् | |
| halanta | Punjabi | ਹਲੰਤ, halanta | ੍ | |
| halanta | Marathi | हलंत, halanta | ् | |
| halanta | Nepali | हलन्त, halanta | ् | |
| halanta | Odia | ହଳନ୍ତ, hôḷôntô | ୍ | |
| halanta | Gujarati | હાલાંત, hālānta | ્ | |
| hosonto | Bengali | হসন্ত, hôsôntô | ্ | |
| hosonto | Assamese | হসন্ত, hoxonto / হছন্ত, hosonto | ্ | |
| hosonto | Sylheti | ꠢꠡꠘ꠆ꠔꠧ, hośonto | ◌ ꠆ | |
| pollu | Telugu | పొల్లు, pollu | ్ | |
| pulli | Tamil | புள்ளி, puḷḷi | ் | |
| chandrakkala | Malayalam | ചന്ദ്രക്കല, chandrakkala / വിരാമം, virāmaṁ | ് | Unlike other virama diacritics, it is pronounced [ə̆] word-finally. |
| ardhakshara chihne | Kannada | ಅರ್ಧಾಕ್ಷರ ಚಿಹ್ನೆ, ardhākṣara cihne / ಸುರುಳಿ, suruḷi | ್ | |
| hal kirima | Sinhalese | හල් කිරිම, hal kirīma | ් | |
| a that | Burmese | အသတ်, a.sat, IPA: [ʔa̰θaʔ] | ် | lit. "nonexistence" |
| viream | Khmer | វិរាម, viream | ៑ | |
| toandeakheat | Khmer | ទណ្ឌឃាដ, toandeakheat | ៍ | |
| karan, thanthakhat | Thai | การันต์, kārạnt / ทัณฑฆาต, thanthakhat | ◌์ | Thanthakhat is the name of the diacritic, while karan refers to the character that was marked. These two terms are often used interchangeably. It is used to mark as silent vowels or consonants that were originally pronounced, but have become silenced in Thai pronunciation (mostly from Sanskrit and Old Khmer). This diacritic is sometimes used in loanwords from European languages to mark final consonants in consonant clusters (e.g. want as วอนท์). |
| pinthu | Thai | พินทุ, pinthu | ◌ฺ | Pinthu is akin to Sanskrit bindu, and means "point" or "dot". It is used to mark a syllable as closed, and it is only used in Thai script when writing Pali or Sanskrit. |
| nikkhahit | Thai | นฤคหิต / นิคหิต | ◌ํ | Nikkhahit represents what was originally anusvāra in Sanskrit. Like pinthu, it is also only used when writing Pali or Sanskrit in Thai script. It marks a syllable as nasalized, realized in Thai as a nasal closed consonant following the vowel. |
| rahaam | Northern Thai (Lanna) | ᩁᩉ᩶ᩣ᩠ᨾ, rahaam | ◌᩺ | |
| rahaam | Tai Khün | ᩁᩉ᩶ᩣ᩠ᨾ, rahaam | ◌᩼ | |
| rahaam | Tai Lue | ᩁᩉ᩶ᩣ᩠ᨾ, rahaam | ◌᩼ | |
| wirama | Kawi | 𑼮𑼶𑼬𑼴𑼪, wirāma | ◌𑽁 | |
| pangkon | Javanese | ꦥꦁꦏꦺꦴꦤ꧀, pangkon | ◌꧀ | Other variations of the pangkon exist if the suppressed syllable is in the middle of a word (a subjoined pasangan form to stack the next consonant instead). |
| adeg-adeg | Balinese | ᬳᬤᭂᬕ᭄ᬳᬤᭂᬕ᭄, adəg-adəg | ◌᭄ | |
| pangolat | Mandailing | ᯇᯝᯬᯞᯖ᯲, pangolat | ◌᯲ | |
| pangolat | Pakpak | ᯇᯝᯬᯞᯖ᯲, pangolat | ◌᯲ | |
| pangolat | Toba | ᯇᯝᯬᯞᯖ᯲, pangolat | ◌᯲ | |
| penengen | Karo | ᯇᯧᯉᯧᯝᯧᯉ᯳, pənəngən | ◌᯳ | |
| panongonan | Simalungun | ᯈᯉᯬᯝᯬᯉᯉ᯳, panongonan | ◌᯳ | |
| pamaeh | Sundanese | ᮕᮙᮆᮂ, pamaeh | ◌᮪ | |
| bunuhan | Rejang | ꤷꥈꤵꥈꥁꥐ, bunuhan | ꥓ | |
| sukun | Dhivehi | ސުކުން, sukun | ް◌ | Derives from Arabic "sukun" |
| Srog med | Tibetan | Srog med | ྄ | Only used when transcribing Sanskrit |

== Usage ==
In Devanagari and many other Indic scripts, a virama is used to cancel the inherent vowel of a consonant letter and represent a consonant without a vowel, a "dead" consonant. For example, in Devanagari,

1. क is a consonant letter, ka,
2. ् is a virāma; therefore,
3. क् (ka + virāma) represents a dead consonant k.

If this k क् is further followed by another consonant letter, for example, ṣa ष, the result might look like क्‌ष, which represents kṣa as ka + (visible) virāma + ṣa. In this case, two elements k क् and ṣa ष are simply placed one by one, side by side. Alternatively, kṣa can be also written as a ligature क्ष, which is actually the preferred form. Generally, when a dead consonant letter C_{1} and another consonant letter C_{2} are conjoined, the result may be:

1. A fully conjoined ligature of C_{1}+C_{2};
2. Half-conjoined—
  - C_{1}-conjoining: a modified form (half form) of C_{1} attached to the original form (full form) of C_{2}
  - C_{2}-conjoining: a modified form of C_{2} attached to the full form of C_{1}; or
3. Non-ligated: full forms of C_{1} and C_{2} with a visible virama.

If the result is fully or half-conjoined, the (conceptual) virama which made C_{1} dead becomes invisible, logically existing only in a character encoding scheme such as ISCII or Unicode. If the result is not ligated, a virama is visible, attached to C_{1}, actually written.

Basically, those differences are only glyph variants, and the three forms are semantically identical. Although there may be a preferred form for a given consonant cluster in each language and some scripts do not have some kind of ligatures or half forms at all, it is generally acceptable to use a nonligature form instead of a ligature form even when the latter is preferred if the font does not have a glyph for the ligature. In some other cases, whether to use a ligature or not is just a matter of taste.

The virāma in the sequence C_{1} + virāma + C_{2} may thus work as an invisible control character to ligate C_{1} and C_{2} in Unicode. For example,

- ka क + virāma + ṣa ष = kṣa क्ष

is a fully conjoined ligature. It is also possible that the virāma does not ligate C_{1} and C_{2}, leaving the full forms of C_{1} and C_{2} as they are:

- ka क + virama + ṣa ष = kṣa क्‌ष

is an example of such a non-ligated form.

The sequences ङ्क ङ्ख ङ्ग ङ्घ [ṅka ṅkha ṅɡa ṅɡha], in common Sanskrit orthography, should be written as conjuncts (the virāma and the top cross line of the second letter disappear, and what is left of the second letter is written under the ङ and joined to it).

== End of word ==
The inherent vowel is not always pronounced, in particular at the end of a word (schwa deletion). No virāma is used for vowel suppression in such cases. Instead, the orthography is based on Sanskrit where all inherent vowels are pronounced, and leaves to the reader of modern languages to delete the schwa when appropriate.

== Glyph comparison ==
Comparison of virama in different scripts

Aramaic -
Kharoṣṭhī 𐨿 | Ashoka Brahmi 𑁆 | Kushana Brahmi (Note: The middle "Kushana" form of Brahmi is a later style that emerged as Brahmi scripts were beginning to proliferate. Gupta Brahmi was definitely a stylistic descendant from Kushana, but other Brahmi-derived scripts may have descended from earlier forms.) 𑁆 | Tocharian (Note: Tocharian is probably derived from the middle period "Kushana" form of Brahmi, although artifacts from that time are not plentiful enough to establish a definite succession.) -
Gupta Brahmi 𑁆 | Pallava -
Kadamba -
Bhaiksuki 𑰿 | Siddhaṃ 𑖿 | Grantha 𑍍 | Cham -
Sinhala ් | Pyu / Old Mon (Note: Pyu and Old Mon are probably the precursors of the Burmese script, and may be derived from either the Pallava or Kadamba script) -
Tibetan ྄ | Newa 𑑂 | Ahom 𑜫 | Malayalam ് / ഻ / ഼
Telugu ్ | Burmese ် / ္
Lepcha - | Ranjana - | Saurashtra ꣄ | Dives Akuru 𑤽 / 𑤾
Kannada ್ | Kayah Li -
Limbu ᤻ | Soyombo (Note: May also be derived from Devangari (see bottom left of table)) 𑪙 | Khmer ៑ | Tamil ்
Chakma 𑄳 / 𑄴 | Tai Tham ᩠
Meitei Mayek - | Gaudi - | Thai ฺ | Lao ຺
Tai Le -
Marchen - | Tirhuta 𑓂 | New Tai Lue - | Tai Viet - | Aksara Kawi 𑽁 / 𑽂
'Phags-pa - | Odia ୍ | Sharada 𑇀 | Rejang ꥓ | Batak ᯲ / ᯳ | Buginese -
Zanabazar Square 𑩇 | Bengali–Assamese ্ | Takri 𑚶 | Javanese ꧀ | Balinese ᭄ | Makasar -
Hangul (Note: The Origin of Hangul from 'Phags-pa is one of limited influence, inspiring at most a few basic letter shapes. Hangul does not function as an Indic abugida.) - | Northern Nagari - | Dogri 𑠹 | Laṇḍā - | Sundanese ᮪ / ᮫ | Baybayin ᜔ / ᜕
Modi 𑘿 | Gujarati ્ | Khojki 𑈵 | Khudabadi 𑋪 | Mahajani - | Tagbanwa -
Devanagari ् | Nandinagari 𑧠 | Kaithi 𑂹 | Gurmukhi ੍ | Multani - | Buhid -
Canadian Syllabics (Note: Although the basic letter forms of the Canadian Aboriginal Syllabics were derived from handwritten Devanagari letters, this abugida indicates vowel sounds by rotations of the letter form, rather than the use of vowel diacritics as is standard in Indic abugidas.) - | Soyombo (Note: May also be derived from Ranjana (see above)) 𑪙 | Sylheti Nagari ꠆ | Gunjala Gondi 𑶗 | Masaram Gondi (Note: Masaram Gondi acts as an Indic abugida, but its letterforms were not derived from any single precursor script.) 𑵄 / 𑵅 | Hanuno'o ᜴

== Unicode ==
- U+094D ् DEVANAGARI SIGN VIRAMA
- U+09CD ্ BENGALI SIGN VIRAMA
- U+0A4D ੍ GURMUKHI SIGN VIRAMA
- U+0ACD ્ GUJARATI SIGN VIRAMA
- U+0B4D ୍ ORIYA SIGN VIRAMA
- U+0BCD ் TAMIL SIGN VIRAMA
- U+0C4D ్ TELUGU SIGN VIRAMA
- U+0CCD ್ KANNADA SIGN VIRAMA
- U+0D3B ഻ MALAYALAM SIGN VERTICAL BAR VIRAMA
- U+0D3C ഼ MALAYALAM SIGN CIRCULAR VIRAMA
- U+0D4D ് MALAYALAM SIGN VIRAMA
- U+0DCA ් SINHALA SIGN AL-LAKUNA
- U+0E3A ฺ THAI CHARACTER PHINTHU
- U+0EBA ຺ LAO SIGN PALI VIRAMA
- U+0F84 ྄ TIBETAN MARK HALANTA
- U+1039 ္ MYANMAR SIGN VIRAMA
- U+103A ် MYANMAR SIGN ASAT
- U+1714 ᜔ TAGALOG SIGN VIRAMA
- U+1715 ᜕ TAGALOG SIGN PAMUDPOD
- U+1734 ᜴ HANUNOO SIGN PAMUDPOD
- U+17D1 ៑ KHMER SIGN VIRIAM
- U+193B ᤻ LIMBU SIGN SA-I
- U+1A60 ᩠ TAI THAM SIGN SAKOT
- U+1B44 ᭄ BALINESE ADEG ADEG
- U+1BAA ᮪ SUNDANESE SIGN PAMAAEH
- U+1BAB ᮫ SUNDANESE SIGN VIRAMA
- U+1BF2 ᯲ BATAK PANGOLAT
- U+1BF3 ᯳ BATAK PANONGONAN
- U+A806 ꠆ SYLOTI NAGRI SIGN HASANTA
- U+A8C4 ꣄ SAURASHTRA SIGN VIRAMA
- U+A8F3 ꣳ DEVANAGARI SIGN CANDRABINDU VIRAMA
- U+A8F4 ꣴ DEVANAGARI SIGN DOUBLE CANDRABINDU VIRAMA
- U+A953 ꥓ REJANG VIRAMA
- U+A9C0 ꧀ JAVANESE PANGKON
- U+10A3F 𐨿 KHAROSHTHI VIRAMA
- U+11046 𑁆 BRAHMI VIRAMA
- U+110B9 𑂹 KAITHI SIGN VIRAMA
- U+11133 𑄳 CHAKMA VIRAMA
- U+11134 𑄴 CHAKMA MAAYYAA
- U+111C0 𑇀 SHARADA SIGN VIRAMA
- U+11235 𑈵 KHOJKI SIGN VIRAMA
- U+112EA 𑋪 KHUDAWADI SIGN VIRAMA
- U+1134D 𑍍 GRANTHA SIGN VIRAMA
- U+11442 𑑂 NEWA SIGN VIRAMA
- U+114C2 𑓂 TIRHUTA SIGN VIRAMA
- U+115BF 𑖿 SIDDHAM SIGN VIRAMA
- U+1163F 𑘿 MODI SIGN VIRAMA
- U+116B6 𑚶 TAKRI SIGN VIRAMA
- U+1172B 𑜫 AHOM SIGN KILLER
- U+11839 𑠹 DOGRA SIGN VIRAMA
- U+1193D 𑤽 DIVES AKURU SIGN HALANTA
- U+1193E 𑤾 DIVES AKURU VIRAMA
- U+119E0 𑧠 NANDINAGARI SIGN VIRAMA
- U+11A34 𑨴 ZANABAZAR SQUARE SIGN VIRAMA
- U+11A47 𑩇 ZANABAZAR SQUARE SUBJOINER
- U+11A99 𑪙 SOYOMBO SUBJOINER
- U+11C3F 𑰿 BHAIKSUKI SIGN VIRAMA
- U+11D44 𑵄 MASARAM GONDI SIGN HALANTA
- U+11D45 𑵅 MASARAM GONDI VIRAMA
- U+11D97 𑶗 GUNJALA GONDI VIRAMA
- U+11F41 𑽁 KAWI SIGN KILLER
- U+11F42 𑽂 KAWI CONJOINER

== See also ==
- Sukun, a similar diacritic in Arabic script
- Zero consonant
