= I (Indic) =

Letter "I" in Indic scripts

Example glyphs
- Bengali–Assamese: ই
- Tibetan: ཨི
- Tamil: இ
- Thai: ิ
- Malayalam: ഇ
- Sinhala: ඉ
- Ashoka Brahmi: I
- Devanagari: इ

Cognates
- Hebrew: ע
- Greek: Ο, Ω
- Latin: O
- Cyrillic: О, Ѡ, Ѿ, Ꙋ, Ю

Properties
- Phonemic representation: /i/ /ɪ/
- IAST transliteration: i I
- ISCII code point: A6 (166)

I is a vowel of Indic abugidas. In modern Indic scripts, I is derived from the early "Ashoka" Brahmi letter after having gone through the Gupta letter. As an Indic vowel, "I" comes in two normally distinct forms: 1) as an independent letter, and 2) as a vowel sign for modifying a base consonant. Bare consonants without a modifying vowel sign have the inherent "A" vowel.

== Āryabhaṭa numeration ==
Aryabhata used Devanagari letters for numbers, very similar to the Greek numerals, even after the invention of Indian numerals. The "I" sign was used to modify a consonant's value ×10^{2}, but the independent vowel letter did not have an inherent value by itself.

== Historic I ==
There are three different general early historic scripts - Brahmi and its variants, Kharoṣṭhī, and Tocharian, the so-called slanting Brahmi. I as found in standard Brahmi, was a simple geometric shape, with variations toward more flowing forms by the Gupta. Like all Brahmic scripts, Tocharian I has an accompanying vowel mark for modifying a base consonant. In Kharoṣṭhī, the only independent vowel letter is for the inherent A. All other independent vowels, including I are indicated with vowel marks added to the letter A.

=== Brahmi I ===
The Brahmi letter, I, is probably derived from the altered Aramaic Ayin, and is thus related to the modern Latin O and Greek Omicron. Several identifiable styles of writing the Brahmi I can be found, most associated with a specific set of inscriptions from an artifact or diverse records from an historic period. As the earliest and most geometric style of Brahmi, the letters found on the Edicts of Ashoka and other records from around that time are normally the reference form for Brahmi letters, with vowel marks not attested until later forms of Brahmi back-formed to match the geometric writing style.

Brahmi I historic forms
Ashoka (3rd-1st c. BCE)	Girnar (~150 BCE)	Kushana (~150-250 CE)	Gujarat (~250 CE)	Gupta (~350 CE)

=== Tocharian I ===
The Tocharian letter is derived from the Brahmi. Unlike some of the consonants, Tocharian vowels do not have a Fremdzeichen form.

Tocharian consonants with I vowel marks
Ki	Khi	Gi	Ghi	Ci	Chi	Ji	Jhi	Nyi	Ṭi	Ṭhi	Ḍi	Ḍhi	Ṇi
Ti	Thi	Di	Dhi	Ni	Pi	Phi	Bi	Bhi	Mi	Yi	Ri	Li	Vi
Śi	Ṣi	Si	Hi										

=== Kharoṣṭhī I ===
The Kharoṣṭhī letter I is indicated with the vowel mark. As an independent vowel, I is indicated by adding the vowel marks to the independent vowel letter A.

== Devanagari I ==
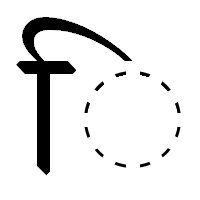
Devanagari independent I and I vowel sign.

I (इ) is a vowel of the Devanagari abugida. It ultimately arose from the Brahmi letter, after having gone through the Gupta letter. Letters that derive from it are the Gujarati letter ઇ, and the Modi letter 𑘂.

=== Devanagari Using Languages ===
The Devanagari script is used to write the Hindi language, Sanskrit and the majority of Indo-Aryan languages. In most of these languages, इ is pronounced as [i]. Like all Indic scripts, Devanagari vowels come in two forms: an independent vowel form for syllables that begin with a vowel sound, and a vowel sign attached to base consonant to override the inherent /ə/ vowel.

== Bengali I ==
Bengali independent I and I vowel sign.

I (ই) is a vowel of the Bengali abugida. It is derived from the Siddhaṃ letter, and is marked by a similar horizontal head line, but less geometric shape, than its Devanagari counterpart, इ.

=== Bengali Script Using Languages ===
The Bengali script is used to write several languages of eastern India, notably the Bengali language and Assamese. In most languages, ই is pronounced as [i]. Like all Indic scripts, Bengali vowels come in two forms: an independent vowel form for syllables that begin with a vowel sound, and a vowel sign attached to base consonant to override the inherent /ɔ/ vowel.

== Gujarati I ==
Gujarati independent I and I vowel sign.

I (ઇ) is a vowel of the Gujarati abugida. It is derived from the Devanagari I, and ultimately the Brahmi letter.

=== Gujarati-using Languages ===
The Gujarati script is used to write the Gujarati and Kutchi languages. In both languages, ઇ is pronounced as [i]. Like all Indic scripts, Gujarati vowels come in two forms: an independent vowel form for syllables that begin with a vowel sound, and a vowel sign attached to base consonant to override the inherent /ə/ vowel.

== Telugu I ==
Telugu independent vowel and vowel sign I.

I (ఇ) is a vowel of the Telugu abugida. It ultimately arose from the Brahmi letter. It is closely related to the Kannada letter ಇ. Like in other Indic scripts, Telugu vowels have two forms: and independent letter for word and syllable-initial vowel sounds, and a vowel sign for changing the inherent "a" of Telugu consonant letters. Vowel signs in Telugu can interact with a base consonant in one of three ways: 1) the vowel sign touches or sits adjacent to the base consonant without modifying the shape of either 2) the vowel sign sits directly above the consonant, replacing its v-shaped headline, 3) the vowel sign and consonant interact, forming a ligature.

Telugu I vowel sign on క, ఖ, గ, ఘ & ఙ: Ki, Khi, Gi, Ghi and Ngi. Note that how the vowel sign interacts with the base consonant is dependent on the location of the headline, the absence of a headline, and the presence of a tail to attach to.

== Malayalam I ==
Malayalam independent vowel and vowel sign I.

I (ഇ) is a vowel of the Malayalam abugida. It ultimately arose from the Brahmi letter, via the Grantha letter i. Like in other Indic scripts, Malayalam vowels have two forms: an independent letter for word and syllable-initial vowel sounds, and a vowel sign for changing the inherent "a" of consonant letters. Vowel signs in Malayalam usually sit adjacent to its base consonant - below, to the left, right, or both left and right, but are always pronounced after the consonant sound.

== Odia I ==
Odia independent, vowel sign, and subjoined I.

I (ଇ) is a vowel of the Odia abugida. It ultimately arose from the Brahmi letter, via the Siddhaṃ letter i. Like in other Indic scripts, Odia vowels have two forms: an independent letter for word and syllable-initial vowel sounds, and a vowel sign for changing the inherent "a" of consonant letters. Vowel signs in Odia usually sit adjacent to its base consonant - below, to the left, right, or both left and right, but are always pronounced after the consonant sound. No base consonants are altered in form when adding a vowel sign, and there are no consonant+vowel ligatures in Odia. Unlike other vowels, ଇ has an alternate subjoined matra form used on letters with an open top - ଖ (Kha), ଥ (Tha) and ଧ (Dha).

== Kaithi I ==
Kaithi independent vowel and vowel sign I.

I (𑂅) is a vowel of the Kaithi abugida. It ultimately arose from the Brahmi letter, via the Siddhaṃ letter I. Like in other Indic scripts, Kaithi vowels have two forms: an independent letter for word and syllable-initial vowel sounds, and a vowel sign for changing the inherent "a" of consonant letters. Vowel signs in Kaithi usually sit adjacent to its base consonant - below, to the left, right, or both left and right, but are always pronounced after the consonant sound. No base consonants are altered in form when adding a vowel sign, and there are no consonant+vowel ligatures in Kaithi.

== Tirhuta I ==
Tirhuta independent vowel and vowel sign I.

I (𑒃) is a vowel of the Tirhuta abugida. It ultimately arose from the Brahmi letter, via the Siddhaṃ letter I. Like in other Indic scripts, Tirhuta vowels have two forms: an independent letter for word and syllable-initial vowel sounds, and a vowel sign for changing the inherent "a" of consonant letters. Vowel signs in Tirhuta usually sit adjacent to its base consonant - below, to the left, right, or both left and right, but are always pronounced after the consonant sound. No consonants are altered in form when adding the I vowel mark, although there are some consonant+vowel ligatures in Tirhuta.

== Comparison of I ==
The various Indic scripts are generally related to each other through adaptation and borrowing, and as such the glyphs for cognate letters, including I, are related as well.

Comparison of I in different scripts

Aramaic
Kharoṣṭhī 𐨁	Ashoka Brahmi / 𑀺	Kushana Brahmi (Note: The middle "Kushana" form of Brahmi is a later style that emerged as Brahmi scripts were beginning to proliferate. Gupta Brahmi was definitely a stylistic descendant from Kushana, but other Brahmi-derived scripts may have descended from earlier forms.) / 𑀺	Tocharian (Note: Tocharian is probably derived from the middle period "Kushana" form of Brahmi, although artifacts from that time are not plentiful enough to establish a definite succession.)
Gupta Brahmi / 𑀺	Pallava
Kadamba -
Bhaiksuki 𑰂 / 𑰰	Siddhaṃ / 𑖰	Grantha 𑌇 / 𑌿	Cham ꨁ / ꨩ
Sinhala ඉ / ි	Pyu / Old Mon (Note: Pyu and Old Mon are probably the precursors of the Burmese script, and may be derived from either the Pallava or Kadamba script) -
Tibetan /	Newa 𑐂 / 𑐶	Ahom 𑜢	Malayalam ഇ / ി
Telugu ఇ / ి	Burmese ဣ / ိ
Lepcha ᰧ	Ranjana	Saurashtra ꢄ / ꢶ	Dives Akuru 𑤂 / 𑤱
Kannada ಇ / ಿ	Kayah Li ꤤ
Limbu ᤡ	Soyombo (Note: May also be derived from Devangari (see bottom left of table)) 𑩑	Khmer ឥ / ិ	Tamil / ி
Chakma 𑄄 / 𑄨	Tai Tham ᩍ / ᩥ
Meitei Mayek ꯏ / ꯤ	Gaudi -	Thai ิ	Lao ິ
Tai Le ᥤ
Marchen 𑲱	Tirhuta 𑒃 / 𑒱	New Tai Lue -	Tai Viet ꪲ	Aksara Kawi 𑼆 / 𑼶
'Phags-pa ꡞ	Odia ଇ / ି	Sharada 𑆅 / 𑆴	Rejang ꥇ	Batak ᯤ / ᯪ, ᯫ	Buginese ᨗ
Zanabazar Square 𑨁	Bengali–Assamese / ি	Takri 𑚂 / 𑚮	Javanese ꦆ / ꦶ	Balinese ᬇ / ᬶ	Makasar 𑻳
Hangul (Note: The Origin of Hangul from 'Phags-pa is one of limited influence, inspiring at most a few basic letter shapes. Hangul does not function as an Indic abugida.) ㅣ	Northern Nagari -	Dogri 𑠂 / 𑠭	Laṇḍā -	Sundanese ᮄ / ᮤ	Baybayin ᜁ / ᜒ
Modi 𑘂 / 𑘱	Gujarati ઇ / િ	Khojki 𑈂 / 𑈭	Khudabadi 𑊲 / 𑋡	Mahajani 𑅑	Tagbanwa ᝡ / ᝲ
Devanagari / ि	Nandinagari 𑦢 / 𑧒	Kaithi / 𑂱	Gurmukhi ਇ / ਿ	Multani 𑊁	Buhid ᝁ / ᝒ
Canadian Syllabics (Note: Although the basic letter forms of the Canadian Aboriginal Syllabics were derived from handwritten Devanagari letters, this abugida indicates vowel sounds by rotations of the letter form, rather than the use of vowel diacritics as is standard in Indic abugidas.) -	Soyombo (Note: May also be derived from Ranjana (see above)) 𑩑	Sylheti Nagari ꠁ / ꠤ	Gunjala Gondi 𑵢 / 𑶋	Masaram Gondi (Note: Masaram Gondi acts as an Indic abugida, but its letterforms were not derived from any single precursor script.) 𑴂 / 𑴲	Hanuno'o ᜡ / ᜲ

== Character encodings of I ==
Most Indic scripts are encoded in the Unicode Standard, and as such the letter I in those scripts can be represented in plain text with unique codepoint. I from several modern-use scripts can also be found in legacy encodings, such as ISCII.

Character information
Preview							ఇ		ଇ		ಇ		ഇ		ઇ		ਇ	
Unicode name	DEVANAGARI LETTER I		BENGALI LETTER I		TAMIL LETTER I		TELUGU LETTER I		ORIYA LETTER I		KANNADA LETTER I		MALAYALAM LETTER I		GUJARATI LETTER I		GURMUKHI LETTER I	
Encodings	decimal	hex	dec	hex	dec	hex	dec	hex	dec	hex	dec	hex	dec	hex	dec	hex	dec	hex
Unicode	2311	U+0907	2439	U+0987	2951	U+0B87	3079	U+0C07	2823	U+0B07	3207	U+0C87	3335	U+0D07	2695	U+0A87	2567	U+0A07
UTF-8	224 164 135	E0 A4 87	224 166 135	E0 A6 87	224 174 135	E0 AE 87	224 176 135	E0 B0 87	224 172 135	E0 AC 87	224 178 135	E0 B2 87	224 180 135	E0 B4 87	224 170 135	E0 AA 87	224 168 135	E0 A8 87
Numeric character reference	&#2311;	&#x907;	&#2439;	&#x987;	&#2951;	&#xB87;	&#3079;	&#xC07;	&#2823;	&#xB07;	&#3207;	&#xC87;	&#3335;	&#xD07;	&#2695;	&#xA87;	&#2567;	&#xA07;
ISCII	166	A6	166	A6	166	A6	166	A6	166	A6	166	A6	166	A6	166	A6	166	A6

Character information
Preview	Ashoka Kushana Gupta				𑌇	
Unicode name	BRAHMI LETTER I		SIDDHAM LETTER I		GRANTHA LETTER I	
Encodings	decimal	hex	dec	hex	dec	hex
Unicode	69639	U+11007	71042	U+11582	70407	U+11307
UTF-8	240 145 128 135	F0 91 80 87	240 145 150 130	F0 91 96 82	240 145 140 135	F0 91 8C 87
UTF-16	55300 56327	D804 DC07	55301 56706	D805 DD82	55300 57095	D804 DF07
Numeric character reference	&#69639;	&#x11007;	&#71042;	&#x11582;	&#70407;	&#x11307;

Character information
Preview	ꡞ		𑐂		𑰂		𑆅	
Unicode name	PHAGS-PA LETTER I		NEWA LETTER I		BHAIKSUKI LETTER I		SHARADA LETTER I	
Encodings	decimal	hex	dec	hex	dec	hex	dec	hex
Unicode	43102	U+A85E	70658	U+11402	72706	U+11C02	70021	U+11185
UTF-8	234 161 158	EA A1 9E	240 145 144 130	F0 91 90 82	240 145 176 130	F0 91 B0 82	240 145 134 133	F0 91 86 85
UTF-16	43102	A85E	55301 56322	D805 DC02	55303 56322	D807 DC02	55300 56709	D804 DD85
Numeric character reference	&#43102;	&#xA85E;	&#70658;	&#x11402;	&#72706;	&#x11C02;	&#70021;	&#x11185;

Character information
Preview	ဣ		ᩍ	
Unicode name	MYANMAR LETTER I		TAI THAM LETTER I	
Encodings	decimal	hex	dec	hex
Unicode	4131	U+1023	6733	U+1A4D
UTF-8	225 128 163	E1 80 A3	225 169 141	E1 A9 8D
Numeric character reference	&#4131;	&#x1023;	&#6733;	&#x1A4D;

Character information
Preview	ឥ		ิ	
Unicode name	KHMER INDEPENDENT VOWEL QI		THAI CHARACTER SARA I	
Encodings	decimal	hex	dec	hex
Unicode	6053	U+17A5	3636	U+0E34
UTF-8	225 158 165	E1 9E A5	224 184 180	E0 B8 B4
Numeric character reference	&#6053;	&#x17A5;	&#3636;	&#xE34;

Character information
Preview	ඉ		ꤤ		𑄄		ᥤ		𑤂		ꢄ		ꨁ	
Unicode name	SINHALA LETTER IYANNA		KAYAH LI LETTER I		CHAKMA LETTER I		TAI LE LETTER I		DIVES AKURU LETTER I		SAURASHTRA LETTER I		CHAM LETTER I	
Encodings	decimal	hex	dec	hex	dec	hex	dec	hex	dec	hex	dec	hex	dec	hex
Unicode	3465	U+0D89	43300	U+A924	69892	U+11104	6500	U+1964	71938	U+11902	43140	U+A884	43521	U+AA01
UTF-8	224 182 137	E0 B6 89	234 164 164	EA A4 A4	240 145 132 132	F0 91 84 84	225 165 164	E1 A5 A4	240 145 164 130	F0 91 A4 82	234 162 132	EA A2 84	234 168 129	EA A8 81
UTF-16	3465	0D89	43300	A924	55300 56580	D804 DD04	6500	1964	55302 56578	D806 DD02	43140	A884	43521	AA01
Numeric character reference	&#3465;	&#xD89;	&#43300;	&#xA924;	&#69892;	&#x11104;	&#6500;	&#x1964;	&#71938;	&#x11902;	&#43140;	&#xA884;	&#43521;	&#xAA01;

Character information
Preview	𑘂		𑦢		ꠁ		𑵢			
Unicode name	MODI LETTER I		NANDINAGARI LETTER I		SYLOTI NAGRI LETTER I		GUNJALA GONDI LETTER I		KAITHI LETTER I	
Encodings	decimal	hex	dec	hex	dec	hex	dec	hex	dec	hex
Unicode	71170	U+11602	72098	U+119A2	43009	U+A801	73058	U+11D62	69765	U+11085
UTF-8	240 145 152 130	F0 91 98 82	240 145 166 162	F0 91 A6 A2	234 160 129	EA A0 81	240 145 181 162	F0 91 B5 A2	240 145 130 133	F0 91 82 85
UTF-16	55301 56834	D805 DE02	55302 56738	D806 DDA2	43009	A801	55303 56674	D807 DD62	55300 56453	D804 DC85
Numeric character reference	&#71170;	&#x11602;	&#72098;	&#x119A2;	&#43009;	&#xA801;	&#73058;	&#x11D62;	&#69765;	&#x11085;

Character information
Preview	𑒃	
Unicode name	TIRHUTA LETTER I	
Encodings	decimal	hex
Unicode	70787	U+11483
UTF-8	240 145 146 131	F0 91 92 83
UTF-16	55301 56451	D805 DC83
Numeric character reference	&#70787;	&#x11483;

Character information
Preview	𑚂		𑠂		𑈂		𑊲		𑅑		𑊁	
Unicode name	TAKRI LETTER I		DOGRA LETTER I		KHOJKI LETTER I		KHUDAWADI LETTER I		MAHAJANI LETTER I		MULTANI LETTER I	
Encodings	decimal	hex	dec	hex	dec	hex	dec	hex	dec	hex	dec	hex
Unicode	71298	U+11682	71682	U+11802	70146	U+11202	70322	U+112B2	69969	U+11151	70273	U+11281
UTF-8	240 145 154 130	F0 91 9A 82	240 145 160 130	F0 91 A0 82	240 145 136 130	F0 91 88 82	240 145 138 178	F0 91 8A B2	240 145 133 145	F0 91 85 91	240 145 138 129	F0 91 8A 81
UTF-16	55301 56962	D805 DE82	55302 56322	D806 DC02	55300 56834	D804 DE02	55300 57010	D804 DEB2	55300 56657	D804 DD51	55300 56961	D804 DE81
Numeric character reference	&#71298;	&#x11682;	&#71682;	&#x11802;	&#70146;	&#x11202;	&#70322;	&#x112B2;	&#69969;	&#x11151;	&#70273;	&#x11281;

Character information
Preview	ᬇ		ᯤ		ꦆ		ᮄ	
Unicode name	BALINESE LETTER IKARA		BATAK LETTER I		JAVANESE LETTER I		SUNDANESE LETTER I	
Encodings	decimal	hex	dec	hex	dec	hex	dec	hex
Unicode	6919	U+1B07	7140	U+1BE4	43398	U+A986	7044	U+1B84
UTF-8	225 172 135	E1 AC 87	225 175 164	E1 AF A4	234 166 134	EA A6 86	225 174 132	E1 AE 84
Numeric character reference	&#6919;	&#x1B07;	&#7140;	&#x1BE4;	&#43398;	&#xA986;	&#7044;	&#x1B84;

Character information
Preview	ᜁ		ᝡ		ᝁ		ᜡ		𑴂	
Unicode name	TAGALOG LETTER I		TAGBANWA LETTER I		BUHID LETTER I		HANUNOO LETTER I		MASARAM GONDI LETTER I	
Encodings	decimal	hex	dec	hex	dec	hex	dec	hex	dec	hex
Unicode	5889	U+1701	5985	U+1761	5953	U+1741	5921	U+1721	72962	U+11D02
UTF-8	225 156 129	E1 9C 81	225 157 161	E1 9D A1	225 157 129	E1 9D 81	225 156 161	E1 9C A1	240 145 180 130	F0 91 B4 82
UTF-16	5889	1701	5985	1761	5953	1741	5921	1721	55303 56578	D807 DD02
Numeric character reference	&#5889;	&#x1701;	&#5985;	&#x1761;	&#5953;	&#x1741;	&#5921;	&#x1721;	&#72962;	&#x11D02;
