= Kha (Indic) =

Letter "Kha" in Indic scripts

Example glyphs
- Bengali–Assamese: Kha
- Tibetan: Kha
- Thai: ข
- Malayalam: ഖ
- Sinhala: ඛ
- Ashoka Brahmi: Kha
- Devanagari: Kha

Cognates
- Hebrew: ק
- Greek: Ϙ (Ϟ), Φ
- Latin: Q
- Cyrillic: Ҁ, Ф

Properties
- Phonemic representation: /kʰ/ /x/^{B}
- IAST transliteration: kha Kha
- ISCII code point: B4 (180)
- ^B in Northern Thai, Tai Lü and Tai Khün

Kha is the second consonant of Indic abugidas. In modern Indic scripts, kha is derived from the Brahmi letter, which is probably derived from the Aramaic ("Q").

== Mathematics ==
=== Āryabhaṭa numeration ===
Aryabhata used Devanagari letters for numbers, very similar to the Greek numerals, even after the invention of Indian numerals. The values of the different forms of ख are:

- ख [kʰə] = 2 (२)
- खि [kʰi] = 200 (२००)
- खु [kʰu] = 20,000 (२० ०००)
- खृ [kʰr̩] = 2,000,000 (२० ०० ०००)
- खॢ [kʰl̩] = 2×10^{8} (२×१०^{८})
- खे [kʰeː] = 2×10^{10} (२×१०^{१०})
- खै [kʰəi̯] = 2×10^{12} (२×१०^{१२})
- खो [kʰoː] = 2×10^{14} (२×१०^{१४})
- खौ [kʰəu̯] = 2×10^{16} (२×१०^{१६})

== Historic Kha ==
There are three different general early historic scripts - Brahmi and its variants, Kharoshthi, and Tocharian, the so-called slanting Brahmi. Kha as found in standard Brahmi, was a simple geometric shape, with slight variations toward the Gupta. The Tocharian Kha did not have an alternate Fremdzeichen form. The third form of kha, in Kharoshthi was probably derived from Aramaic separately from the Brahmi letter.

=== Brahmi Kha ===
The Brahmi letter, Kha, is probably derived from the Aramaic Qoph, and is thus related to the modern Latin Q and Greek Koppa. Several identifiable styles of writing the Brahmi Kha can be found, most associated with a specific set of inscriptions from an artifact or diverse records from an historic period. As the earliest and most geometric style of Brahmi, the letters found on the Edicts of Ashoka and other records from around that time are normally the reference form for Brahmi letters, with vowel marks not attested until later forms of Brahmi back-formed to match the geometric writing style.

Brahmi Kha historic forms
Ashoka (3rd-1st c. BCE)	Girnar (~150 BCE)	Kushana (~150-250 CE)	Gujarat (~250 CE)	Gupta (~350 CE)

=== Tocharian Kha ===
The Tocharian letteris derived from the Brahmi, but does not have an alternate Fremdzeichen form.

Tocharian Kha with vowel marks
Kha	Khā	Khi	Khī	Khu	Khū	Khr	Khr̄	Khe	Khai	Kho	Khau	Khä

=== Kharoshthi Kha ===
The Kharoshthi letter is generally accepted as being derived from the Aramaic Qoph, and is thus related to Q and Koppa, in addition to the Brahmi Kha.

== Devanagari Kha ==
Kha (ख) is the second consonant of the Devanagari abugida. It ultimately arose from the Brahmi letter, after having gone through the Gupta letter. Letters that derive from it are the Gujarati letter ખ and the Modi letter 𑘏.

=== Devanagari-using Languages ===
In all languages, ख is pronounced as [kʰə] or [kʰ] when appropriate. Because of borrowings from languages with different phonemic inventories, Devanagari has employed the nukta to create an additional related letter ख़ ḫa that is pronounced as /x/ and can be used to retain non-native distinctions in Hindi texts.

Kh	Kha	Khā	Khi	Khī	Khu	Khū	Khr	Khr̄	Khl	Khl̄	Khe	Khai	Kho	Khau
ख्	ख	खा	खि	खी	खु	खू	खृ	खॄ	खॢ	खॣ	खे	खै	खो	खौ

=== Conjuncts With ख ===
Half form of Kha.

Devanagari exhibits conjunct ligatures, as is common in Indic scripts. Like most Devanagari letters, in modern texts ख forms very few irregular ligatures, and assumes a half form to create most conjuncts, such as ख् + य = ख्य. Earlier texts show many more ligature forms, with vertically stacked conjuncts being common. The use of modern ligatures and vertical conjuncts may vary across languages using the Devanagari script, with Marathi in particular preferring the use of half forms where texts in other languages would show ligatures and vertical stacks.

==== Ligature conjuncts of ख ====
True ligatures are quite rare in Indic scripts. The most common ligated conjuncts in Devanagari are in the form of a slight mutation to fit in context or as a consistent variant form appended to the adjacent characters. Those variants include Na and the Repha and Rakar forms of Ra. Nepali and Marathi texts use the "eyelash" Ra half form for an initial "R" instead of repha.

- Repha र् (r) + ख (kʰa) gives the ligature rkʰa (र्ख): ^{note}

- Eyelash र् (r) + ख (kʰa) gives the ligature rkʰa:

- ख् (kʰa) + र (r) gives the ligature kʰra (ख्र):

==== Stacked conjuncts of ख ====
Vertically stacked ligatures are the most common conjunct forms found in Devanagari text. Although the constituent characters may need to be stretched and moved slightly in order to stack neatly, stacked conjuncts can be broken down into recognizable base letters, or a letter and an otherwise standard ligature.

- छ् (cʰ) + ख (kʰa) gives the ligature छ्ख (cʰkʰa):

- ढ् (ḍʱ) + ख (kʰa) gives the ligature ढ्ख (ḍʱkʰa):

- ड् (ḍ) + ख (kʰa) gives the ligature ड्ख (ḍkʰa):

- द् (d) + ख (kʰa) gives the ligature द्ख (dkʰa):

- ख् (kʰ) + ब (ba) gives the ligature ख्ब (kʰba):

- ख् (kʰ) + च (ca) gives the ligature ख्च (kʰca):

- ख् (kʰ) + छ (cʰa) gives the ligature ख्छ (kʰcʰa):

- ख् (kʰ) + ड (ḍa) gives the ligature ख्ड (kʰḍa):

- ख् (kʰ) + ज (ja) gives the ligature ख्ज (kʰja):

- ख् (kʰ) + झ (jʰa) gives the ligature ख्झ (kʰjʰa):

- ख् (kʰ) + ज্ (j) + ञ (ña) gives the ligature ख्ज्ञ (kʰjña):

- ख् (kʰ) + क (ka) gives the ligature ख्क (kʰka):

- ख् (kʰ) + ख (kʰa) gives the ligature ख्ख (kʰkʰa):

- ख् (kʰ) + ल (la) gives the ligature ख्ल (kʰla):

- ख् (kʰ) + न (na) gives the ligature ख्न (kʰna):

- ख् (kʰ) + ङ (ŋa) gives the ligature ख्ङ (kʰŋa):

- ख् (kʰ) + ण (ṇa) gives the ligature ख्ण (kʰṇa):

- ख् (kʰ) + ञ (ña) gives the ligature ख्ञ (kʰña):

- ख् (kʰ) + व (va) gives the ligature ख्व (kʰva):

- ङ् (ŋ) + ख (kʰa) gives the ligature ङ्ख (ŋkʰa):

- ठ् (ṭʰ) + ख (kʰa) gives the ligature ठ्ख (ṭʰkʰa):

- ट् (ṭ) + ख (kʰa) gives the ligature ट्ख (ṭkʰa):

== Bengali Kha ==
The Bengali script খ is derived from the Siddhaṃ, and is marked by the lack of a horizontal head line, unlike its Devanagari counterpart, ख. The inherent vowel of Bengali consonant letters is /ɔ/, so the bare letter খ will sometimes be transliterated as "kho" instead of "kha". Adding okar, the "o" vowel mark, খো, gives a reading of /kho/. Like all Indic consonants, খ can be modified by marks to indicate another (or no) vowel than its inherent "a".

Bengali খ with vowel marks
Kha	Khā	Khi	Khī	Khu	Khū	Khr	Khr̄	Khe	Khai	Kho	Khau	Kh
খ	খা	খি	খী	খু	খূ	খৃ	খৄ	খে	খৈ	খো	খৌ	খ্

=== খ in Bengali-using languages ===
খ is used as a basic consonant character in all of the major Bengali script orthographies, including Bengali and Assamese.

=== Conjuncts with খ ===
Bengali খ does not exhibit any irregular conjunct ligatures, beyond adding the standard trailing forms of ব, য ya-phala, and র ra-phala, and the leading repha form of র.

- খ্ (kʰ) + ব (va) gives the ligature খ্ব (kʰva), with the va phala suffix:

- খ্ (kʰ) + য (ya) gives the ligature খ্য (kʰya), with the ya phala suffix:

- খ্ (kʰ) + র (ra) gives the ligature খ্র (kʰra), with the ra phala suffix:

- ঙ (ng) + খ (kʰa) gives the ligature ঙ্খ (ngkʰa):

- র্ (r) + খ (kʰa) gives the ligature র্খ (rkʰa), with the repha prefix:

- র্ (r) + খ্ (kʰ) + য (ya) gives the ligature র্খ্য (rkʰya), with the repha prefix and ya phala suffix:

- স্ (s) + খ (kʰa) gives the ligature স্খ (skʰa):

== Gurmukhi Kha ==
Khakhaa [kʰəkʰːɑ] (ਖ) is the seventh letter of the Gurmukhi alphabet. Its name is [kʰəkʰːɑ] and is pronounced as /kʰ/ when used in words. It is derived from the Laṇḍā letter kha, ultimately from the Brahmi kha. Gurmukhi kha does not have a special pairin or addha (reduced) form for making conjuncts, and in modern Punjabi texts does not take a half form or halant to indicate the bare consonant /kʰ/, although Gurmukhi Sanskrit texts may use an explicit halant.

== Gujarati Kha ==
Gujarati Kha.

Kha (ખ) is the second consonant of the Gujarati abugida. It is derived from the Devanagari Kha, and ultimately the Brahmi letter.

=== Gujarati-using Languages ===
The Gujarati script is used to write the Gujarati and Kutchi languages. In both languages, ખ is pronounced as [kʰə] or [kʰ] when appropriate. Like all Indic scripts, Gujarati uses vowel marks attached to the base consonant to override the inherent /ə/ vowel:

Kha	Khā	Khi	Khī	Khu	Khū	Khr	Khl	Khr̄	Khl̄	Khĕ	Khe	Khai	Khŏ	Kho	Khau	Kh
Gujarati Kha syllables, with vowel marks in red.

=== Conjuncts with ખ ===
Half form of Kha.

Gujarati ખ exhibits conjunct ligatures, much like its parent Devanagari Script. Most Gujarati conjuncts can only be formed by reducing the letter shape to fit tightly to the following letter, usually by dropping a character's vertical stem, sometimes referred to as a "half form". A few conjunct clusters can be represented by a true ligature, instead of a shape that can be broken into constituent independent letters, and vertically stacked conjuncts can also be found in Gujarati, although much less commonly than in Devanagari. True ligatures are quite rare in Indic scripts. The most common ligated conjuncts in Gujarati are in the form of a slight mutation to fit in context or as a consistent variant form appended to the adjacent characters. Those variants include Na and the Repha and Rakar forms of Ra.

- ખ્ (kʰ) + ર (ra) gives the ligature KhRa:

- ર્ (r) + ખ (kʰa) gives the ligature RKha:

- ખ્ (kʰ) + ન (na) gives the ligature KhNa:

== Odia Kha ==
Odia independent and subjoined letter Kha.

The Odia letter kha (ଖ) is the second letter of the Odia abugida. It ultimately arose from the Brahmi letter, via the Siddhaṃ letter Kha. Like in other Indic scripts, Odia consonants have the inherent vowel "a", and take one of several modifying vowel signs to represent syllables with another vowel or no vowel at all. Like other Oriya letters with an open top, ଖ takes the subjoined matra form of the vowel i (ଇ):

Odia Kha with vowel matras
Kha	Khā	Khi	Khī	Khu	Khū	Khr̥	Khr̥̄	Khl̥	Khl̥̄	Khe	Khai	Kho	Khau	Kh
ଖ	ଖା	ଖି	ଖୀ	ଖୁ	ଖୂ	ଖୃ	ଖୄ	ଖୢ	ଖୣ	ଖେ	ଖୈ	ଖୋ	ଖୌ	ଖ୍

=== Conjuncts of ଖ ===
As is common in Indic scripts, Odia joins letters together to form conjunct consonant clusters. The most common conjunct formation is achieved by using a small subjoined form of trailing consonants. Most consonants' subjoined forms are identical to the full form, just reduced in size, although a few drop the curved headline or have a subjoined form not directly related to the full form of the consonant. The second type of conjunct formation is through pure ligatures, where the constituent consonants are written together in a single graphic form. This ligature may be recognizable as being a combination of two characters or it can have a conjunct ligature unrelated to its constituent characters.

- ଙ୍ (ŋ) + ଖ (kʰa) gives the ligature ŋkʰa:

- ର୍ (r) + ଖ (kʰa) gives the ligature rkʰa:

- ଖ୍ (kʰ) + ର (ra) gives the ligature kʰra:

== Telugu Kha ==
Telugu independent and subjoined Kha.

Kha (ఖ) is the second letter of the Telugu abugida. It ultimately arose from the Brahmi letter. It is closely related to the Kannada letter ಖ. Since it lacks the v-shaped headstroke common to most Telugu letters, ఖ remains unaltered by most vowel matras, and its subjoined form is simply a smaller version of the normal letter shape: Telugu conjuncts are created by reducing trailing letters to a subjoined form that appears below the initial consonant of the conjunct. Many subjoined forms are created by dropping their headline, with many extending the end of the stroke of the main letter body to form an extended tail reaching up to the right of the preceding consonant. This subjoining of trailing letters to create conjuncts is in contrast to the leading half forms of Devanagari and Bengali letters. Ligature conjuncts are not a feature in Telugu, with the only non-standard construction being an alternate subjoined form of Ṣa (borrowed from Kannada) in the KṢa conjunct.

== Kannada Kha ==
Kannada kha (ಖ) is the second letter of its script, and like its closely related Telugu counterpart ఖ, is derived from the Bhattiprolu letter kha. Like its Telugu counterpart, it is generally unchanged by matras, and its subjoined form is the same as its full form: ಖ್ಖ

== Malayalam Kha ==
Malayalam letter Kha

Kha (ഖ) is the second letter of the Malayalam abugida. It ultimately arose from the Brahmi letter, via the Grantha letter kha. Like in other Indic scripts, Malayalam consonants have the inherent vowel "a", and take one of several modifying vowel signs to represent syllables with another vowel or no vowel at all.

Malayalam Kha matras: Kha, Khā, Khi, Khī, Khu, Khū, Khr̥, Khr̥̄, Khl̥, Khl̥̄, Khe, Khē, Khai, Kho, Khō, Khau, and Kh.

=== Conjuncts of ഖ ===
As is common in Indic scripts, Malayalam joins letters together to form conjunct consonant clusters. There are several ways in which conjuncts are formed in Malayalam texts: using a post-base form of a trailing consonant placed under the initial consonant of a conjunct, a combined ligature of two or more consonants joined, a conjoining form that appears as a combining mark on the rest of the conjunct, the use of an explicit candrakkala mark to suppress the inherent "a" vowel, or a special consonant form called a "chillu" letter, representing a bare consonant without the inherent "a" vowel. Kha does not exhibit ligation in conjuncts with other letters, does not have a chillu (bare consonant) form, and uses the explicit virama unless coupled with the normal post-base and repha consonant forms. Texts written with the modern reformed Malayalam orthography, put̪iya lipi, may favor more regular conjunct forms than older texts in paḻaya lipi, due to changes undertaken in the 1970s by the Government of Kerala.

- ഖ് (kʰ) + ര (ra) gives the ligature kʰra:

== Sinhala Kha ==
The Sinhala Suddha ka (ඛ), called mahaapraana kayanna in Unicode, is the second letter of Sinhala script, and is part of the Miśra set of Sinhala consonants. Although it is derived from the Grantha letter kha, modern Sinhala no longer distinguishes between aspirated (Miśra) and unaspirated (Śuddha) consonants, and ඛ is pronounced the same as ක, ka, but is used for loanwords and in higher register writing. ඛ does not have any unique ligatures or conjunct forms, and displays an explicit virama as the first member of a conjunct cluster.

== Thai High Kho ==
Kho khai (ข) and kho khuat (ฃ) are the second and third letters of the Thai script. They fall under the high class of Thai consonants. In IPA, kho khai and kho khuat are pronounced as [kʰ] at the beginning of a syllable and are pronounced as [k̚] at the end of a syllable. Both kho khwai and kho khuat are derived from the old Khmer kha. The next three letters of the alphabet, kho khwai (ค), kho khon (ฅ), and kho ra-khang (ฆ), are also named kho, however, they all fall under the low class of Thai consonants. Unlike many Indic scripts, Thai consonants do not form conjunct ligatures, and use the pinthu—an explicit virama with a dot shape—to indicate bare consonants.

=== Kho Khai ===
In the acrophony of the Thai script, khai (ไข่) means ‘egg’. Kho khai corresponds to the Sanskrit character ‘ख’.

=== Kho Khuat ===
In the acrophony of the Thai script, khuat (ขวด) means ‘bottle’. Kho khuat (ฃ) represents the voiceless velar fricative sound /x/ that existed in Old Thai at the time the alphabet was created but no longer exists in Modern Thai. When the Thai script was developed, the voiceless velar fricative sound did not have a Sanskrit or Pali counterpart so the character kho khai was slightly modified to create kho khuat. During the Old Thai period, this sound merged into the aspirated stop /kʰ/, and as a result the use of this letters became unstable. Although kho khuat is now obsolete, it remains in dictionaries, preserving the traditional count of 44 letters in the Thai alphabet. When the first Thai typewriter was developed by Edwin Hunter McFarland in 1892, there was simply no space for all characters, thus kho khuat was of the two letters left out along with kho khon. Although kho khuat does not appear in modern Thai orthography, some writers and publishers are trying to reintroduce its usage.

== Lao Kha ==
Kho sung or kʰāi (ຂ) is the second letter of the Lao script. It is derived from the old Khmer kha, and is essentially a fossil of Thai kho khai as it existed in the 14th century. Like its Thai counterpart, it is a high tone letter and does not form ligatures or conjuncts.

== Tibetan Kha ==
Kha (ཁ) is the second letter of the Tibetan script, and is derived from the equivalent Siddhaṃ letter. As with all Tibetan letters, it can appear as a head consonant or subjoined to a head consonant. Like many Indic scripts, the halant - an explicit virama - can be used for indicating a bare consonant, although subjoined forms are used to form consonant conjuncts. The subjoined form of kha is essentially identical to its head form: ཁྑ

== Burmese Kha ==
Kha (ခ) is the second letter of the Burmese (Myanmar) script, and is probably derived from the Grantha letter kha. Like many Burmese letters, it is not seen with the visible virama, as /kh/ does not occur syllable finally. It can form conjuncts with other velar letters in abbreviations and foreign terms: က္ခ

== Tai Tham High Kha ==
Tai Tham independent (ᨡ), subjoined (◌᩠ᨡ) and modified letter Kha (ᨢ).

High Kha (ᨡ) is a consonant of the Tai Tham abugida. It ultimately arose from the Brahmi letter, via the Pallava letter Kha. The Tai Tham script was originally used to write Pali (the name 'Tham' is a local form of dharma), and faced the same limitations in writing Tai languages as Khmer had. The Thai solutions were adopted, with consonants being systematically modified by the addition of a tail to supply new consonants, mostly for fricatives. High Kha was modified, yielding what for convenience we call High Khha (ᨢ). The two sounds, /kʰ/ and /x/, subsequently merged, and High Khha is now obsolete.

=== High Kha ===
Like in other Indic scripts, Tai Tham consonants have the inherent vowel "a", and take one of several modifying vowel signs to represent syllables with another vowel.

Tai Tham High Kha with vowel matras
Syllable type	Kha	Khā	Khi	Khī	Khư	Khư̄	Khu	Khū	Khē	Khǣ	Khō
Closed or open	ᨡ	ᨡᩣ	ᨡᩥ	ᨡᩦ	ᨡᩧ	ᨡᩨ	ᨡᩩ	ᨡᩪ	ᨡᩮ	ᨡᩯ	ᨡᩮᩣ
	Khai	Khaư	Khau				Khō̹i				
Open	ᨡᩱ	ᨡᩲ	ᨡᩮᩢᩣ	ᨡᩮᩫᩢᩣ	ᨡᩮᩫᩣ	ᨡᩳ	ᨡᩭ				
	Kho	Kha	Khō	Khœ̄		Khō̹				Kho̹	
Open	ᨡᩰᩡ	ᨡᩡ	ᨡᩰ	ᨡᩮᩬᩥ	ᨡᩮᩦ	ᨡᩬᩴ	ᨡᩴ	ᨡᩬᩳ	ᨡᩳ	ᨡᩰᩬᩡ	ᨡᩰᩬ
Closed	ᨡᩫ	ᨡᩢ	ᨡᩰᩫ	ᨡᩮᩥ	ᨡᩮᩦ	ᨡᩬ				ᨡᩬᩢ	
	Khūa	Khīa		Khư̄a							
Open	ᨡ᩠ᩅᩫ	ᨡ᩠ᨿᩮ	ᨡᩮᩢ᩠ᨿ	ᨡᩮᩬᩥᩋ	ᨡᩮᩬᩨᩋ	ᨡᩮᩬᩨ					
Closed	ᨡ᩠ᩅ	ᨡ᩠ᨿ		ᨡᩮᩬᩥ	ᨡᩮᩬᩨ						

Notes:

1. The transliteration scheme is an amalgamation of the ALA-LC schemes of Khmer, Pali and Lao.
2. Many of the matras include subscript wa, subscript ya, subscript a or even the letter a itself. Anusvara and visarga are also used.
3. In the relevant Tai languages, a short vowel in an open syllable includes an underlyinɡ ɡlottal stop.

Additional short vowels not shown above may be synthesised from the corresponding long vowel by appending visarga for open syllables (as shown for Kho) or applying mai sat for closed syllables (as shown for Kho̹). Unlike the other languages, Lao instead replaces an ī or ư̄ glyph by the corresponding short vowel.

The lack of a vowel between consonants notated as consonants is indicated by vertically stacking the consonants, generally without their touching. The Brahmi style of writing final consonants small and low developed, as vestigially seen in Khmer and Lao, into using subscripting to indicate that a consonant had no vowel of its own. In theory this leaves it ambiguous as to whether a consonant precedes or follows the vowel, but ambiguous cases are rare. Finally, if there is no room for the consonant below, it may be left as an 'independent' consonant or. in some cases, written superscript. Occasionally the visible virama (ra haam) is used, but this may signify that the consonant so marked is silent. The vowel /a/ will be made explicit if the final consonant is notated by a letter and is included in the same stack as the initial consonant or is written in a stack just consisting of that consonant.

Kha can serve as the initial consonant of a stack, and several examples can be seen above. It can also occur as the final element of a consonant stack in words of Indic origin, both in the cluster kkh of the word Pali word ᨾᩮᩣᨠ᩠ᨡ mokkha 'release' and as the final consonant after apocation of the final vowel, e.g. ᩃᩮ᩠ᨡ lekh 'number'.

=== High Khha ===
Like in other Indic scripts, Tai Tham consonants have the inherent vowel "a", and take one of several modifying vowel signs to represent syllables with another vowel.

Tai Tham High Khha with vowel matras
Syllable type	K͟ha	K͟hā	K͟hi	K͟hī	K͟hư	K͟hư̄	K͟hu	K͟hū	K͟hē	K͟hǣ	K͟hō
Closed or open	ᨢ	ᨢᩣ	ᨢᩥ	ᨢᩦ	ᨢᩧ	ᨢᩨ	ᨢᩩ	ᨢᩪ	ᨢᩮ	ᨢᩯ	ᨢᩮᩣ
	K͟hai	K͟haư	K͟hau				K͟hō̹i				
Open	ᨢᩱ	ᨢᩲ	ᨢᩮᩢᩣ	ᨢᩮᩫᩢᩣ	ᨢᩮᩫᩣ	ᨢᩳ	ᨢᩭ				
	K͟ho	K͟ha	K͟hō	K͟hœ̄		K͟hō̹				K͟ho̹	
Open	ᨢᩰᩡ	ᨢᩡ	ᨢᩰ	ᨢᩮᩬᩥ	ᨢᩮᩦ	ᨢᩬᩴ	ᨢᩴ	ᨢᩬᩳ	ᨢᩳ	ᨢᩰᩬᩡ	ᨢᩰᩬ
Closed	ᨢᩫ	ᨢᩢ	ᨢᩰᩫ	ᨢᩮᩥ	ᨢᩮᩦ	ᨢᩬ				ᨢᩬᩢ	
	K͟hūa	K͟hīa		K͟hư̄a							
Open	ᨢ᩠ᩅᩫ	ᨢ᩠ᨿᩮ	ᨢᩮᩢ᩠ᨿ	ᨢᩮᩬᩥᩋ	ᨢᩮᩬᩨᩋ	ᨢᩮᩬᩨ					
Closed	ᨢ᩠ᩅ	ᨢ᩠ᨿ		ᨢᩮᩬᩥ	ᨢᩮᩬᩨ						

Notes:

1. The transliteration scheme is an amalgamation of the ALA-LC schemes of Khmer, Pali and Lao.
2. Many of the matras include subscript wa, subscript ya, subscript a or even the letter a itself. Anusvara and visarga are also used.
3. In the relevant Tai languages, a short vowel in an open syllable includes an underlyinɡ ɡlottal stop.

Additional short vowels not shown above may be synthesised from the corresponding long vowel by appending visarga for open syllables (as shown for K͟ho) or applying mai sat for closed syllables (as shown for K͟ho̹). Unlike the other languages, Lao instead replaces an ī or ư̄ glyph by the corresponding short vowel.

The lack of a vowel between consonants notated as consonants is indicated by vertically stacking the consonants, generally without their touching. The Brahmi style of writing final consonants small and low developed, as vestigially seen in Khmer and Lao, into using subscripting to indicate that a consonant had no vowel of its own. In theory this leaves it ambiguous as to whether a consonant precedes or follows the vowel, but ambiguous cases are rare. Finally, if there is no room for the consonant below, it may be left as an 'independent' consonant or. in some cases, written superscript. Occasionally the visible virama (ra haam) is used, but this may signify that the consonant so marked is silent. The vowel /a/ will be made explicit if the final consonant is notated by a letter and is included in the same stack as the initial consonant or is written in a stack just consisting of that consonant.

This form occurs only as the initial consonant of a consonant stack.

== Tirhuta Kha ==
Tirhuta consonant Kha

Kha (𑒐) is a consonant of the Tirhuta abugida. It ultimately arose from the Brahmi letter, via the Siddhaṃ letter Kha. Like in other Indic scripts, Tirhuta consonants have the inherent vowel "a", and take one of several modifying vowel signs to represent sylables with another vowel or no vowel at all.

Tirhuta Kha with vowel matras
Kha	Khā	Khi	Khī	Khu	Khū	Khṛ	Khṝ	Khḷ	Khḹ	Khē	Khe	Khai	Khō	Kho	Khau	Kh
𑒐	𑒐𑒰	𑒐𑒱	𑒐𑒲	𑒐𑒳	𑒐𑒴	𑒐𑒵	𑒐𑒶	𑒐𑒷	𑒐𑒸	𑒐𑒹	𑒐𑒺	𑒐𑒻	𑒐𑒼	𑒐𑒽	𑒐𑒾	𑒐𑓂

=== Conjuncts of 𑒐 ===
As is common in Indic scripts, Tirhuta joins letters together to form conjunct consonant clusters. The most common conjunct formation is achieved by using an explicit virama. As is common in most Indic scripts, conjuncts of ra are indicated with a repha or rakar mark attached to the rest of the consonant cluster. In addition, other consonants take unique combining forms when in conjunct with other letters, and there are several vertical conjuncts and true ligatures that can be found in Tirhuta writing.

- 𑒐୍ (kʰ) + 𑒢 (na) gives the ligature kʰna:

- 𑒐୍ (kʰ) + 𑒩 (ra) gives the ligature kʰra:

- 𑒐୍ (kʰ) + 𑒫 (va) gives the ligature kʰva:

- 𑒓୍ (ŋ) + 𑒐 (kʰa) gives the ligature ŋkʰa:

- 𑒩୍ (r) + 𑒐 (kʰa) gives the ligature rkʰa:

- 𑒞୍ (t) + 𑒐 (kʰa) gives the ligature tkʰa:

== Khmer Kha ==
ខ	្ខ
Independent	Subscript
Khmer independent and subjoined letter Kha.

Kha (ខ) is a consonant of the Khmer abugida. It ultimately arose from the Brahmi letter, via the Pallava letter Kha. Like in other Indic scripts, Khmer consonants have the inherent vowel "a", and take one of several modifying vowel signs to represent syllables with another vowel. Actually, the sounds of the vowels are modified by the consonant; see the article on the Khmer writing system for details.

Khmer Kha with vowel matras
Kha	Khā	Khi	Khī	Khu	Khū	Khr̥	Khr̥̄	Khl̥	Khl̥̄	Khe	Khai	Kho	Khau	Khẏ	Khȳ	Khua	Khoe	Khẏa	Khia	Khae	Khà
ខ	ខា	ខិ	ខី	ខុ	ខូ	ខ្ឫ	ខ្ឬ	ខ្ឭ	ខ្ឮ	ខេ	ខៃ	ខោ	ខៅ	ខឹ	ខឺ	ខួ	ខើ	ខឿ	ខៀ	ខែ	ខៈ

Note: The vowels (other than vocalic liquids) are shown using the ALA-LC scheme.

Pali and Sanskrit are written as abugidas with the lack of a vowel between consonants notated as consonants indicated by vertically stacking the consonants without their touching. For phonetically final consonants, the lack of a vowel is marked by virama.

The Khmer language works the same, except that a different method is used for the last consonant of a word. The final consonant in a consonant stack is indicated as having no implicit vowel by applying tôndôkhéad to it. By default, a consonant surmounted by robat is silent and lacks an inherent vowel. The yŭkôlpĭntŭ positively indicates the presence of a final implicit vowel, plus its automatic glottal stop. Otherwise, there is no final vowel, unless the word is of Pali or Sanskrit origin, in which case the spelling is ambiguous. Up until the start of the 20th century, the lack of a final vowel could be indicating by subscripting the consonant, as then done in Lao and in other non-Indic languages using the Tai Tham script.

== Kaithi Kha ==
Kaithi consonant and half-form Kha.

Kha (𑂎) is a consonant of the Kaithi abugida. It ultimately arose from the Brahmi letter, via the Siddhaṃ letter Kha. Like in other Indic scripts, Kaithi consonants have the inherent vowel "a", and take one of several modifying vowel signs to represent syllables with another vowel or no vowel at all.

Kaithi Kha with vowel matras
Kha	Khā	Khi	Khī	Khu	Khū	Khe	Khai	Kho	Khau	Kh
𑂎	𑂎𑂰	𑂎𑂱	𑂎𑂲	𑂎𑂳	𑂎𑂴	𑂎𑂵	𑂎𑂶	𑂎𑂷	𑂎𑂸	𑂎𑂹

=== Conjuncts of 𑂎 ===
As is common in Indic scripts, Kaithi joins letters together to form conjunct consonant clusters. The most common conjunct formation is achieved by using a half form of preceding consonants, although several consonants use an explicit virama. Most half forms are derived from the full form by removing the vertical stem. As is common in most Indic scripts, conjuncts of ra are indicated with a repha or rakar mark attached to the rest of the consonant cluster. In addition, there are a few vertical conjuncts that can be found in Kaithi writing, but true ligatures are not used in the modern Kaithi script.

- 𑂎୍ (kʰ) + 𑂩 (ra) gives the ligature kʰra:

- 𑂩୍ (r) + 𑂎 (kʰa) gives the ligature rkʰa:

== Comparison of Kha ==
The various Indic scripts are generally related to each other through adaptation and borrowing, and as such the glyphs for cognate letters, including Kha, are related as well.

Comparison of Kha in different scripts

Aramaic
Kharoṣṭhī 𐨑	Ashoka Brahmi	Kushana Brahmi (Note: The middle "Kushana" form of Brahmi is a later style that emerged as Brahmi scripts were beginning to proliferate. Gupta Brahmi was definitely a stylistic descendant from Kushana, but other Brahmi-derived scripts may have descended from earlier forms.)	Tocharian (Note: Tocharian is probably derived from the middle period "Kushana" form of Brahmi, although artifacts from that time are not plentiful enough to establish a definite succession.)
Gupta Brahmi	Pallava
Kadamba -
Bhaiksuki 𑰏	Siddhaṃ	Grantha 𑌖	Cham ꨇ
Sinhala ඛ	Pyu / Old Mon (Note: Pyu and Old Mon are probably the precursors of the Burmese script, and may be derived from either the Pallava or Kadamba script) -
Tibetan	Newa 𑐏	Ahom 𑜁	Malayalam ഖ
Telugu ఖ	Burmese ခ
Lepcha ᰂ	Ranjana	Saurashtra ꢓ	Dives Akuru 𑤍
Kannada ಖ	Kayah Li ꤋ
Limbu ᤂ	Soyombo (Note: May also be derived from Devangari (see bottom left of table)) 𑩝	Khmer ខ	Tamil -
Chakma 𑄈	Tai Tham ᨡ / ᨢ
Meitei Mayek ꯈ	Gaudi -	Thai ข / ฃ	Lao ຂ
Tai Le ᥑ
Marchen 𑱳	Tirhuta 𑒐	New Tai Lue ᦃ	Tai Viet ꪂ / ꪃ	Aksara Kawi
'Phags-pa ꡁ	Odia ଖ	Sharada 𑆒	Rejang -	Batak -	Buginese -
Zanabazar Square 𑨌	Bengali–Assamese	Takri 𑚋	Javanese ꦑ	Balinese ᬔ	Makasar -
Hangul (Note: The Origin of Hangul from 'Phags-pa is one of limited influence, inspiring at most a few basic letter shapes. Hangul does not function as an Indic abugida.) -	Northern Nagari -	Dogri 𑠋	Laṇḍā -	Sundanese ᮮ	Baybayin -
Modi 𑘏	Gujarati ખ	Khojki 𑈉	Khudabadi 𑊻	Mahajani 𑅖	Tagbanwa -
Devanagari	Nandinagari 𑦯	Kaithi	Gurmukhi ਖ	Multani 𑊅	Buhid -
Canadian Syllabics (Note: Although the basic letter forms of the Canadian Aboriginal Syllabics were derived from handwritten Devanagari letters, this abugida indicates vowel sounds by rotations of the letter form, rather than the use of vowel diacritics as is standard in Indic abugidas.) -	Soyombo (Note: May also be derived from Ranjana (see above)) 𑩝	Sylheti Nagari ꠈ	Gunjala Gondi 𑵲	Masaram Gondi (Note: Masaram Gondi acts as an Indic abugida, but its letterforms were not derived from any single precursor script.) 𑴍	Hanuno'o -

== Character encodings of Kha ==
Most Indic scripts are encoded in the Unicode Standard, and as such the letter Kha in those scripts can be represented in plain text with unique codepoint. Kha from several modern-use scripts can also be found in legacy encodings, such as ISCII.

Character information
Preview					ఖ		ଖ		ಖ		ഖ		ખ		ਖ	
Unicode name	DEVANAGARI LETTER KHA		BENGALI LETTER KHA		TELUGU LETTER KHA		ORIYA LETTER KHA		KANNADA LETTER KHA		MALAYALAM LETTER KHA		GUJARATI LETTER KHA		GURMUKHI LETTER KHA	
Encodings	decimal	hex	dec	hex	dec	hex	dec	hex	dec	hex	dec	hex	dec	hex	dec	hex
Unicode	2326	U+0916	2454	U+0996	3094	U+0C16	2838	U+0B16	3222	U+0C96	3350	U+0D16	2710	U+0A96	2582	U+0A16
UTF-8	224 164 150	E0 A4 96	224 166 150	E0 A6 96	224 176 150	E0 B0 96	224 172 150	E0 AC 96	224 178 150	E0 B2 96	224 180 150	E0 B4 96	224 170 150	E0 AA 96	224 168 150	E0 A8 96
Numeric character reference	&#2326;	&#x916;	&#2454;	&#x996;	&#3094;	&#xC16;	&#2838;	&#xB16;	&#3222;	&#xC96;	&#3350;	&#xD16;	&#2710;	&#xA96;	&#2582;	&#xA16;
ISCII	180	B4	180	B4	180	B4	180	B4	180	B4	180	B4	180	B4	180	B4

Character information
Preview	Ashoka Kushana Gupta		𐨑				𑌖	
Unicode name	BRAHMI LETTER KHA		KHAROSHTHI LETTER KHA		SIDDHAM LETTER KHA		GRANTHA LETTER KHA	
Encodings	decimal	hex	dec	hex	dec	hex	dec	hex
Unicode	69652	U+11014	68113	U+10A11	71055	U+1158F	70422	U+11316
UTF-8	240 145 128 148	F0 91 80 94	240 144 168 145	F0 90 A8 91	240 145 150 143	F0 91 96 8F	240 145 140 150	F0 91 8C 96
UTF-16	55300 56340	D804 DC14	55298 56849	D802 DE11	55301 56719	D805 DD8F	55300 57110	D804 DF16
Numeric character reference	&#69652;	&#x11014;	&#68113;	&#x10A11;	&#71055;	&#x1158F;	&#70422;	&#x11316;

Character information
Preview			ꡁ		𑨌		𑐏		𑰏		𑆒	
Unicode name	TIBETAN LETTER KHA		PHAGS-PA LETTER KHA		ZANABAZAR SQUARE LETTER KHA		NEWA LETTER KHA		BHAIKSUKI LETTER KHA		SHARADA LETTER KHA	
Encodings	decimal	hex	dec	hex	dec	hex	dec	hex	dec	hex	dec	hex
Unicode	3905	U+0F41	43073	U+A841	72204	U+11A0C	70671	U+1140F	72719	U+11C0F	70034	U+11192
UTF-8	224 189 129	E0 BD 81	234 161 129	EA A1 81	240 145 168 140	F0 91 A8 8C	240 145 144 143	F0 91 90 8F	240 145 176 143	F0 91 B0 8F	240 145 134 146	F0 91 86 92
UTF-16	3905	0F41	43073	A841	55302 56844	D806 DE0C	55301 56335	D805 DC0F	55303 56335	D807 DC0F	55300 56722	D804 DD92
Numeric character reference	&#3905;	&#xF41;	&#43073;	&#xA841;	&#72204;	&#x11A0C;	&#70671;	&#x1140F;	&#72719;	&#x11C0F;	&#70034;	&#x11192;

Character information
Preview	ခ		ᨡ		ᨢ		ᦃ	
Unicode name	MYANMAR LETTER KHA		TAI THAM LETTER HIGH KHA		TAI THAM LETTER HIGH KXA		NEW TAI LUE LETTER HIGH XA	
Encodings	decimal	hex	dec	hex	dec	hex	dec	hex
Unicode	4097	U+1001	6689	U+1A21	6690	U+1A22	6531	U+1983
UTF-8	225 128 129	E1 80 81	225 168 161	E1 A8 A1	225 168 162	E1 A8 A2	225 166 131	E1 A6 83
Numeric character reference	&#4097;	&#x1001;	&#6689;	&#x1A21;	&#6690;	&#x1A22;	&#6531;	&#x1983;

Character information
Preview	ខ		ຂ		ข		ฃ		ꪂ		ꪃ	
Unicode name	KHMER LETTER KHA		LAO LETTER KHO SUNG		THAI CHARACTER KHO KHAI		THAI CHARACTER KHO KHUAT		TAI VIET LETTER LOW KHO		TAI VIET LETTER HIGH KHO	
Encodings	decimal	hex	dec	hex	dec	hex	dec	hex	dec	hex	dec	hex
Unicode	6017	U+1781	3714	U+0E82	3586	U+0E02	3587	U+0E03	43650	U+AA82	43651	U+AA83
UTF-8	225 158 129	E1 9E 81	224 186 130	E0 BA 82	224 184 130	E0 B8 82	224 184 131	E0 B8 83	234 170 130	EA AA 82	234 170 131	EA AA 83
Numeric character reference	&#6017;	&#x1781;	&#3714;	&#xE82;	&#3586;	&#xE02;	&#3587;	&#xE03;	&#43650;	&#xAA82;	&#43651;	&#xAA83;

Character information
Preview	ඛ		ꤋ		𑄈		ᥑ		𑜁		𑤍		ꢓ		ꨇ	
Unicode name	SINHALA LETTER MAHAAPRAANA KAYANNA		KAYAH LI LETTER KHA		CHAKMA LETTER KHAA		TAI LE LETTER XA		AHOM LETTER KHA		DIVES AKURU LETTER KHA		SAURASHTRA LETTER KHA		CHAM LETTER KHA	
Encodings	decimal	hex	dec	hex	dec	hex	dec	hex	dec	hex	dec	hex	dec	hex	dec	hex
Unicode	3483	U+0D9B	43275	U+A90B	69896	U+11108	6481	U+1951	71425	U+11701	71949	U+1190D	43155	U+A893	43527	U+AA07
UTF-8	224 182 155	E0 B6 9B	234 164 139	EA A4 8B	240 145 132 136	F0 91 84 88	225 165 145	E1 A5 91	240 145 156 129	F0 91 9C 81	240 145 164 141	F0 91 A4 8D	234 162 147	EA A2 93	234 168 135	EA A8 87
UTF-16	3483	0D9B	43275	A90B	55300 56584	D804 DD08	6481	1951	55301 57089	D805 DF01	55302 56589	D806 DD0D	43155	A893	43527	AA07
Numeric character reference	&#3483;	&#xD9B;	&#43275;	&#xA90B;	&#69896;	&#x11108;	&#6481;	&#x1951;	&#71425;	&#x11701;	&#71949;	&#x1190D;	&#43155;	&#xA893;	&#43527;	&#xAA07;

Character information
Preview	𑘏		𑦯		𑩝		ꠈ		𑵲			
Unicode name	MODI LETTER KHA		NANDINAGARI LETTER KHA		SOYOMBO LETTER KHA		SYLOTI NAGRI LETTER KHO		GUNJALA GONDI LETTER KHA		KAITHI LETTER KHA	
Encodings	decimal	hex	dec	hex	dec	hex	dec	hex	dec	hex	dec	hex
Unicode	71183	U+1160F	72111	U+119AF	72285	U+11A5D	43016	U+A808	73074	U+11D72	69774	U+1108E
UTF-8	240 145 152 143	F0 91 98 8F	240 145 166 175	F0 91 A6 AF	240 145 169 157	F0 91 A9 9D	234 160 136	EA A0 88	240 145 181 178	F0 91 B5 B2	240 145 130 142	F0 91 82 8E
UTF-16	55301 56847	D805 DE0F	55302 56751	D806 DDAF	55302 56925	D806 DE5D	43016	A808	55303 56690	D807 DD72	55300 56462	D804 DC8E
Numeric character reference	&#71183;	&#x1160F;	&#72111;	&#x119AF;	&#72285;	&#x11A5D;	&#43016;	&#xA808;	&#73074;	&#x11D72;	&#69774;	&#x1108E;

Character information
Preview	𑒐		ᰂ		ᤂ		ꯈ		𑱳	
Unicode name	TIRHUTA LETTER KHA		LEPCHA LETTER KHA		LIMBU LETTER KHA		MEETEI MAYEK LETTER KHOU		MARCHEN LETTER KHA	
Encodings	decimal	hex	dec	hex	dec	hex	dec	hex	dec	hex
Unicode	70800	U+11490	7170	U+1C02	6402	U+1902	43976	U+ABC8	72819	U+11C73
UTF-8	240 145 146 144	F0 91 92 90	225 176 130	E1 B0 82	225 164 130	E1 A4 82	234 175 136	EA AF 88	240 145 177 179	F0 91 B1 B3
UTF-16	55301 56464	D805 DC90	7170	1C02	6402	1902	43976	ABC8	55303 56435	D807 DC73
Numeric character reference	&#70800;	&#x11490;	&#7170;	&#x1C02;	&#6402;	&#x1902;	&#43976;	&#xABC8;	&#72819;	&#x11C73;

Character information
Preview	𑚋		𑠋		𑈉		𑊻		𑅖		𑊅	
Unicode name	TAKRI LETTER KHA		DOGRA LETTER KHA		KHOJKI LETTER KHA		KHUDAWADI LETTER KHA		MAHAJANI LETTER KHA		MULTANI LETTER KHA	
Encodings	decimal	hex	dec	hex	dec	hex	dec	hex	dec	hex	dec	hex
Unicode	71307	U+1168B	71691	U+1180B	70153	U+11209	70331	U+112BB	69974	U+11156	70277	U+11285
UTF-8	240 145 154 139	F0 91 9A 8B	240 145 160 139	F0 91 A0 8B	240 145 136 137	F0 91 88 89	240 145 138 187	F0 91 8A BB	240 145 133 150	F0 91 85 96	240 145 138 133	F0 91 8A 85
UTF-16	55301 56971	D805 DE8B	55302 56331	D806 DC0B	55300 56841	D804 DE09	55300 57019	D804 DEBB	55300 56662	D804 DD56	55300 56965	D804 DE85
Numeric character reference	&#71307;	&#x1168B;	&#71691;	&#x1180B;	&#70153;	&#x11209;	&#70331;	&#x112BB;	&#69974;	&#x11156;	&#70277;	&#x11285;

Character information
Preview	ᬔ		ꦑ		ᮮ	
Unicode name	BALINESE LETTER KA MAHAPRANA		JAVANESE LETTER KA MURDA		SUNDANESE LETTER KHA	
Encodings	decimal	hex	dec	hex	dec	hex
Unicode	6932	U+1B14	43409	U+A991	7086	U+1BAE
UTF-8	225 172 148	E1 AC 94	234 166 145	EA A6 91	225 174 174	E1 AE AE
Numeric character reference	&#6932;	&#x1B14;	&#43409;	&#xA991;	&#7086;	&#x1BAE;

Character information
Preview	𑴍	
Unicode name	MASARAM GONDI LETTER KHA	
Encodings	decimal	hex
Unicode	72973	U+11D0D
UTF-8	240 145 180 141	F0 91 B4 8D
UTF-16	55303 56589	D807 DD0D
Numeric character reference	&#72973;	&#x11D0D;
