= Ya (Indic) =

Letter "Ya" in Indic scripts

Example glyphs
- Bengali–Assamese: Ya
- Tibetan: Ya
- Tamil: Ya
- Thai: ย
- Malayalam: യ
- Sinhala: ය
- Ashoka Brahmi: Ya
- Devanagari: Ya

Cognates
- Hebrew: י
- Greek: Ι
- Latin: I, J
- Cyrillic: І, Ї, Ы, Ю

Properties
- Phonemic representation: /j/
- IAST transliteration: y Y
- ISCII code point: CD (205)

Ya is a consonant of Indic abugidas. In modern Indic scripts, Ya is derived from the early "Ashoka" Brahmi letter after having gone through the Gupta letter.

== Āryabhaṭa numeration ==
Aryabhata used Devanagari letters for numbers, very similar to the Greek numerals, even after the invention of Indian numerals. The values of the different forms of य are:

- य [jə] = 30 (३०)
- यि [jɪ] = 3,000 (३ ०००)
- यु [jʊ] = 300,000 (३ ०० ०००)
- यृ [jri] = 30,000,000 (३ ०० ०० ०००)
- यॢ [jlə] = 3×10^{9} (३×१०^{९})
- ये [je] = 3×10^{11} (३×१०^{११})
- यै [jɛː] = 3×10^{13} (३×१०^{१३})
- यो [joː] = 3×10^{15} (३×१०^{१५})
- यौ [jɔː] = 3×10^{17} (३×१०^{१७})

== Historic Ya ==
There are three different general early historic scripts - Brahmi and its variants, Kharoṣṭhī, and Tocharian, the so-called slanting Brahmi. Ya as found in standard Brahmi, was a simple geometric shape, with variations toward more flowing forms by the Gupta. The Tocharian Ya did not have an alternate Fremdzeichen form. The third form of ya, in Kharoshthi was probably derived from Aramaic separately from the Brahmi letter.

=== Brahmi Ya ===
The Brahmi letter, Ya, is probably derived from the Aramaic Yodh, and is thus related to the modern Latin I and J and Greek Iota. Several identifiable styles of writing the Brahmi Ya can be found, most associated with a specific set of inscriptions from an artifact or diverse records from an historic period. As the earliest and most geometric style of Brahmi, the letters found on the Edicts of Ashoka and other records from around that time are normally the reference form for Brahmi letters, with vowel marks not attested until later forms of Brahmi back-formed to match the geometric writing style.

Brahmi Ya historic forms
| Ashoka (3rd-1st c. BCE) | Girnar (~150 BCE) | Kushana (~150-250 CE) | Gujarat (~250 CE) | Gupta (~350 CE) |

=== Tocharian Ya ===
The Tocharian letter is derived from the Brahmi, but does not have an alternate Fremdzeichen form.

Tocharian Ya with vowel marks
| Ya | Yā | Yi | Yī | Yu | Yū | Yr | Yr̄ | Ye | Yai | Yo | Yau | Yä |

=== Kharoṣṭhī Ya ===
The Kharoṣṭhī letter is generally accepted as being derived from the Aramaic Yodh, and is thus related to I, J and Iota, in addition to the Brahmi Ya.

== Devanagari Ya ==
Ya (य) is a consonant of the Devanagari abugida. It ultimately arose from the Brahmi letter, after having gone through the Gupta letter. Letters that derive from it are the Gujarati letter ય, and the Modi letter 𑘧.

=== Old Nepali Ya ===
In old Nepali language texts, a specific nuqta like dot is added to this glyph in order to represent the [j], while the glyph by itself would be used to represent the [dz] sound that the modern Nepali letter ज makes. This style of the letter also continued once the letter ज was reintroducted into Nepali texts as well.

=== Devanagari-using Languages ===
In all languages, य is pronounced as [jə] or [j] when appropriate. Like all Indic scripts, Devanagari uses vowel marks attached to the base consonant to override the inherent /ə/ vowel:

Devanagari य with vowel marks
| Ya | Yā | Yi | Yī | Yu | Yū | Yr | Yr̄ | Yl | Yl̄ | Ye | Yai | Yo | Yau | Y |
|---|---|---|---|---|---|---|---|---|---|---|---|---|---|---|
| य | या | यि | यी | यु | यू | यृ | यॄ | यॢ | यॣ | ये | यै | यो | यौ | य् |

=== Conjuncts with य ===
Half form of Ya.

Devanagari exhibits conjunct ligatures, as is common in Indic scripts. In modern Devanagari texts, most conjuncts are formed by reducing the letter shape to fit tightly to the following letter, usually by dropping a character's vertical stem, sometimes referred to as a "half form". Some conjunct clusters are always represented by a true ligature, instead of a shape that can be broken into constituent independent letters. Vertically stacked conjuncts are ubiquitous in older texts, while only a few are still used routinely in modern Devanagari texts. The use of ligatures and vertical conjuncts may vary across languages using the Devanagari script, with Marathi in particular preferring the use of half forms where texts in other languages would show ligatures and vertical stacks.

==== Ligature conjuncts of य ====
True ligatures are quite rare in Indic scripts. The most common ligated conjuncts in Devanagari are in the form of a slight mutation to fit in context or as a consistent variant form appended to the adjacent characters. Those variants include Na and the Repha and Rakar forms of Ra. Nepali and Marathi texts use the "eyelash" Ra half form for an initial "R" instead of repha.

- Repha र্ (r) + य (ya) gives the ligature rya: ^{note}

- Eyelash र্ (r) + य (ya) gives the ligature rya:

- य্ (y) + न (na) gives the ligature yna:

- य্ (y) + rakar र (ra) gives the ligature yra:

- छ্ (c^{h}) + य (ya) gives the ligature c^{h}ya:

- ढ্ (ḍʱ) + य (ya) gives the ligature ḍʱya:

- ड্ (ḍ) + य (ya) gives the ligature ḍya:

- द্ (d) + द্ (d) + य (ya) gives the ligature ddya:

- द্ (d) + व্ (v) + य (ya) gives the ligature dvya:

- द্ (d) + य (ya) gives the ligature dya:

- ङ্ (ŋ) + य (ya) gives the ligature ŋya:

- ष্ (ṣ) + ठ্ (ṭ^{h}) + य (ya) gives the ligature ṣṭ^{h}ya:

- ठ্ (ṭ^{h}) + य (ya) gives the ligature ṭ^{h}ya:

==== Stacked conjuncts of य ====
Vertically stacked ligatures are the most common conjunct forms found in Devanagari text. Although the constituent characters may need to be stretched and moved slightly in order to stack neatly, stacked conjuncts can be broken down into recognizable base letters, or a letter and an otherwise standard ligature.

- ग্ (g) + न্ (n) + य (ya) gives the ligature gnya:

- ग্ (g) + र্ (r) + य (ya) gives the ligature grya:

- ह্ (h) + य (ya) gives the ligature hya:

- ज্ (j) + ज্ (j) + य (ya) gives the ligature jjya:

- ङ্ (ŋ) + क্ (k) + ष্ (ṣ) + य (ya) gives the ligature ŋkṣya:

- त্ (t) + र্ (r) + य (ya) gives the ligature trya:

- ट্ (ṭ) + य (ya) gives the ligature ṭya:

- य্ (y) + च (ca) gives the ligature yca:

- य্ (y) + ड (ḍa) gives the ligature yḍa:

- य্ (y) + ज (ja) gives the ligature yja:

- य্ (y) + ज্ (j) + ञ (ña) gives the ligature yjña:

- य্ (y) + ल (la) gives the ligature yla:

- य্ (y) + ङ (ŋa) gives the ligature yŋa:

- य্ (y) + ञ (ña) gives the ligature yña:

== Bangla Ya ==
The Bangla script য is derived from the Siddhaṃ, and is marked by a similar horizontal head line, but less geometric shape, than its Devanagari counterpart, य. Unlike most other Indic scripts and like Odia, the Bangla য is pronounced as a voiced postalveolar affricate (similar to the English "j" sound). The "y" sound is represented by the related letter য়. In addition to this, the inherent vowel of Bangla consonant letters is /ɔ/, so the bare letter য will sometimes be transliterated as "jo" instead of "ya". Adding o-kar, the "o" vowel mark, gives a reading of /dʒo/. Like all Indic consonants, য can be modified by marks to indicate another (or no) vowel than its inherent "a".

Bangla য with vowel marks
| ja | jā | ji | jī | ju | jū | jr | jr̄ | je | jai | jo | jau | j |
|---|---|---|---|---|---|---|---|---|---|---|---|---|
| য | যা | যি | যী | যু | যূ | যৃ | যৄ | যে | যৈ | যো | যৌ | য্ |

=== য in Bangla-using languages ===
য is used as a basic consonant character in all of the major Bangla script orthographies, including Bangla and Assamese.

=== Conjuncts with য ===
Bangla য exhibits conjunct ligatures, as is common in Indic scripts, with a tendency towards stacked ligatures.

==== Bangla Ya-phala ====
Bangla Ya-phala

The letter য has a special form when used as the last letter of a conjunct called "Ya-phala" (or "Jô-fôla"). This reduced form of য is appended to the right of the preceding letter or conjunct, with vowel signs falling outside of the ya-phala as in most conjuncts. The use of a reduced Ya-phala is similar to the Ra-phala and Va-phala forms, which attach to the bottom of a letter or conjunct. Unlike these other reduced consonant forms, ya-phala can be appended to the independent A vowel character. In representing Bangla text on computer systems, the Zero-width joiner is used to suppress formation of ya-phala in certain contexts, as Hasant + Ya is realized as ya-phala by default.

- ভ্ (b^{h}) + য (ya) gives the ligature b^{h}ya:

- ব্ (b) + য (ya) gives the ligature bya:

- চ্ (c) + য (ya) gives the ligature cya:

- ঢ্ (ḍʱ) + য (ya) gives the ligature ḍʱya:

- ড্ (ḍ) + য (ya) gives the ligature ḍya:

- ধ্ (dʱ) + য (ya) gives the ligature dʱya:

- দ্ (d) + র্ (r) + য (ya) gives the ligature drya, with ra phala in addition to ya phala:

- দ্ (d) + য (ya) gives the ligature dya:

- গ্ (g) + ধ্ (dʱ) + য (ya) gives the ligature gdʱya:

- ঘ্ (ɡʱ) + য (ya) gives the ligature ɡʱya:

- গ্ (g) + ন্ (n) + য (ya) gives the ligature gnya:

- গ্ (g) + র্ (r) + য (ya) gives the ligature grya, with ra phala in addition to ya phala:

- গ্ (g) + য (ya) gives the ligature gya:

- জ্ (j) + য (ya) gives the ligature jya:

- খ্ (k^{h}) + য (ya) gives the ligature k^{h}ya:

- ক্ (k) + শ্ (ʃ) + ম্ (m) + য (ya) gives the ligature kʃmya:

- ক্ (k) + ষ্ (ṣ) + য (ya) gives the ligature kṣya:

- ক্ (k) + য (ya) gives the ligature kya:

- ল্ (l) + ক্ (k) + য (ya) gives the ligature lkya:

- ল্ (l) + য (ya) gives the ligature lya:

- ম্ (m) + য (ya) gives the ligature mya:

- ন্ (n) + ধ্ (dʱ) + য (ya) gives the ligature ndʱya:

- ন্ (n) + দ্ (d) + য (ya) gives the ligature ndya:

- ঙ্ (ŋ) + ঘ্ (ɡʱ) + য (ya) gives the ligature ŋɡʱya:

- ঙ্ (ŋ) + গ্ (g) + য (ya) gives the ligature ŋgya:

- ঙ্ (ŋ) + ক্ (k) + য (ya) gives the ligature ŋkya:

- ণ্ (ṇ) + ড্ (ḍ) + য (ya) gives the ligature ṇḍya:

- ণ্ (ṇ) + ঠ্ (ṭ^{h}) + য (ya) gives the ligature ṇṭ^{h}ya:

- ণ্ (ṇ) + য (ya) gives the ligature ṇya:

- ন্ (n) + ত্ (t) + র্ (r) + য (ya) gives the ligature ntrya, with ra phala in addition to ya phala:

- ন্ (n) + ত্ (t) + য (ya) gives the ligature ntya:

- ন্ (n) + য (ya) gives the ligature nya:

- প্ (p) + র্ (r) + য (ya) gives the ligature prya, with ra phala in addition to ya phala

- প্ (p) + য (ya) gives the ligature pya:

- র্ (r) + ব্ (b) + য (ya) gives the ligature rbya, with the repha prefix in addition to ya phala:

- র্ (r) + চ্ (c) + য (ya) gives the ligature rcya, with repha and ya phala:

- র্ (r) + ঢ্ (ḍʱ) + য (ya) gives the ligature rḍʱya, with repha and ya phala:

- র্ (r) + ঘ্ (ɡʱ) + য (ya) gives the ligature rɡʱya, with repha and ya phala:

- র্ (r) + গ্ (g) + য (ya) gives the ligature rɡya, with repha and ya phala:

- র্ (r) + হ্ (h) + য (ya) gives the ligature rhya, with repha and ya phala:

- র্ (r) + জ্ (j) + য (ya) gives the ligature rjya, with repha and ya phala:

- র্ (r) + খ্ (k^{h}) + য (ya) gives the ligature rk^{h}ya, with repha and ya phala:

- র্ (r) + ক্ (k) + য (ya) gives the ligature rkya, with repha and ya phala:

- র্ (r) + ম্ (m) + য (ya) gives the ligature rmya, with repha and ya phala:

- র্ (r) + ণ্ (ṇ) + য (ya) gives the ligature rṇya, with repha and ya phala:

- র্ (r) + শ্ (ʃ) + য (ya) gives the ligature rʃya, with repha and ya phala:

- র্ (r) + ষ্ (ṣ) + য (ya) gives the ligature rṣya, with repha and ya phala:

- র্ (r) + থ্ (t^{h}) + য (ya) gives the ligature rt^{h}ya, with repha and ya phala:

- র্ (r) + ত্ (t) + য (ya) gives the ligature rtya, with repha and ya phala:

- শ্ (ʃ) + য (ya) gives the ligature ʃya:

- ষ্ (ṣ) + ঠ্ (ṭ^{h}) + য (ya) gives the ligature ṣṭ^{h}ya:

- ষ্ (ṣ) + ট্ (ṭ) + য (ya) gives the ligature ṣṭya:

- ষ্ (ṣ) + য (ya) gives the ligature ṣya:

- স্ (s) + থ্ (t^{h}) + য (ya) gives the ligature st^{h}ya:

- স্ (s) + ত্ (t) + য (ya) gives the ligature stya:

- স্ (s) + য (ya) gives the ligature sya:

- থ্ (t^{h}) + য (ya) gives the ligature t^{h}ya:

- ত্ (t) + ম্ (m) + য (ya) gives the ligature tmya:

- ত্ (t) + র্ (r) + য (ya) gives the ligature trya, with the ra phala and ya phala suffixes

- ট্ (ṭ) + য (ya) gives the ligature ṭya:

- ত্ (t) + ত্ (t) + য (ya) gives the ligature ttya:

- ত্ (t) + য (ya) gives the ligature tya:

- য্ (y) + য (ya) gives the ligature yya:

==== Other conjuncts of য ====
Ya-phala is almost universal, and its suppression generally only happens in order to express a repha on য instead.

- র্ (r) + য (ya) gives the ligature rya, with the repha prefix:

== Gujarati Ya ==
Gujarati Ya.

Ya (ય) is the twenty-sixth consonant of the Gujarati abugida. It is derived from the Devanagari Ya with the top bar (shiro rekha) removed, and ultimately the Brahmi letter.

=== Gujarati-using Languages ===
The Gujarati script is used to write the Gujarati and Kutchi languages. In both languages, ય is pronounced as [yə] or [y] when appropriate. Like all Indic scripts, Gujarati uses vowel marks attached to the base consonant to override the inherent /ə/ vowel:

| Ya | Yā | Yi | Yī | Yu | Yū | Yr | Yl | Yr̄ | Yl̄ | Yĕ | Ye | Yai | Yŏ | Yo | Yau | Y |
|---|---|---|---|---|---|---|---|---|---|---|---|---|---|---|---|---|
Gujarati Ya syllables, with vowel marks in red.

=== Conjuncts with ય ===
Half form of Ya.

Gujarati ય exhibits conjunct ligatures, much like its parent Devanagari Script. Most Gujarati conjuncts can only be formed by reducing the letter shape to fit tightly to the following letter, usually by dropping a character's vertical stem, sometimes referred to as a "half form". A few conjunct clusters can be represented by a true ligature, instead of a shape that can be broken into constituent independent letters, and vertically stacked conjuncts can also be found in Gujarati, although much less commonly than in Devanagari. True ligatures are quite rare in Indic scripts. The most common ligated conjuncts in Gujarati are in the form of a slight mutation to fit in context or as a consistent variant form appended to the adjacent characters. Those variants include Na and the Repha and Rakar forms of Ra.

- ર્ (r) + ય (ya) gives the ligature RYa:

- ય્ (y) + ર (ra) gives the ligature YRa:

- ય્ (y) + ન (na) gives the ligature YNa:

== Telugu Ya ==
Telugu independent and subjoined Ya.

Ya (య) is a consonant of the Telugu abugida. It ultimately arose from the Brahmi letter. It is closely related to the Kannada letter ಯ. Most Telugu consonants contain a v-shaped headstroke that is related to the horizontal headline found in other Indic scripts, although headstrokes do not connect adjacent letters in Telugu. The headstroke is normally lost when adding vowel matras. Telugu conjuncts are created by reducing trailing letters to a subjoined form that appears below the initial consonant of the conjunct. Many subjoined forms are created by dropping their headline, with many extending the end of the stroke of the main letter body to form an extended tail reaching up to the right of the preceding consonant. This subjoining of trailing letters to create conjuncts is in contrast to the leading half forms of Devanagari and Bangla letters. Ligature conjuncts are not a feature in Telugu, with the only non-standard construction being an alternate subjoined form of Ṣa (borrowed from Kannada) in the KṢa conjunct.

== Malayalam Ya ==
Malayalam letter Ya

Ya (യ) is a consonant of the Malayalam abugida. It ultimately arose from the Brahmi letter, via the Grantha letter Ya. Like in other Indic scripts, Malayalam consonants have the inherent vowel "a", and take one of several modifying vowel signs to represent syllables with another vowel or no vowel at all.

Malayalam Ya matras: Ya, Yā, Yi, Yī, Yu, Yū, Yr̥, Yr̥̄, Yl̥, Yl̥̄, Ye, Yē, Yai, Yo, Yō, Yau, and Y.

=== Conjuncts of യ ===
Malayalam letter Chillu Y

As is common in Indic scripts, Malayalam joins letters together to form conjunct consonant clusters. There are several ways in which conjuncts are formed in Malayalam texts: using a post-base form of a trailing consonant placed under the initial consonant of a conjunct, a combined ligature of two or more consonants joined together, a conjoining form that appears as a combining mark on the rest of the conjunct, the use of an explicit candrakkala mark to suppress the inherent "a" vowel, or a special consonant form called a "chillu" letter, representing a bare consonant without the inherent "a" vowel. Texts written with the modern reformed Malayalam orthography, put̪iya lipi, may favor more regular conjunct forms than older texts in paḻaya lipi, due to changes undertaken in the 1970s by the Government of Kerala.

- യ് (y) + ക (ka) gives the ligature yka:

- യ് (y) + ത (ta) gives the ligature yta:

- യ് (y) + യ (ya) gives the ligature yya:

== Canadian Aboriginal Syllabics Ye ==
ᔦ, ᔨ, ᔪ and ᔭ are the base characters "Ye", "Yi", "Yo" and "Ya" in the Canadian Aboriginal Syllabics. The bare consonant ᔾ (Y) is a small version of the A-series letter ᔭ, although the Western Cree letter ᕀ, derived from Pitman shorthand was the original bare consonant symbol for Y. The character ᔦ is derived from a handwritten form of the Devanagari letter य, without the headline or vertical stem, and the forms for different vowels are derived by mirroring. Unlike most writing systems without legacy computer encodings, complex Canadian syllabic letters are represented in Unicode with pre-composed characters, rather than with base characters and diacritical marks.

| Variant | E-series | | I-series | | O-series | | A-series | | | Other |
|---|---|---|---|---|---|---|---|---|---|---|
| Y + vowel | ᔦ | | ᔨ | | ᔪ | | ᔭ | | | - |
| Y + vowel | Ye | | Yi | | Yo | | Ya | | | - |
| Related small | - | | ᕁ | | ᔿ | | ᔾ | | | ᕀ |
| Related small | - | | Sayasi Yi | | Bible-Cree Y | | Y | | | West Cree Y |
| Y with long vowels | - | | ᔩ | | ᔫ | ᔬ | ᔮ | | - | - |
| Y with long vowels | - | | Yī | | Yō | Cree Yō | Yā | | Cree Yā | - |
| Y + W-vowels | ᔯ | ᔰ | ᔱ | ᔲ | ᔵ | ᔶ | ᔹ | | ᔺ | - |
| Y + W-vowels | Ywe | Cree Ywe | Ywi | Cree Ywi | Ywo | Cree Ywo | Ywa | | Cree Ywa | - |
| Y + long W-vowels | - | | ᔳ | ᔴ | ᔷ | ᔸ | ᔻ | ᔽ | ᔼ | - |
| Y + long W-vowels | - | | Ywī | Cree Ywī | Ywō | Cree Ywō | Ywā | Naskapi Ywā | Cree Ywā | - |
| Y with ring diacritic | - | | ᔧ | | ᣃ | | ᣄ | | | - |
| Y with ring diacritic | - | | Yāi | | Yoy | | Yay | | | - |

== Odia Jya ==
Odia independent Jya.

Jya (ଯ) is a consonant of the Odia abugida. It ultimately arose from the Brahmi letter, via the Siddhaṃ letter Ya. Unlike the cognate letter in many other Indic scripts and similar to the Bangla letter, Odia Jya is pronounced as a voiced postalveolar affricate, same as "J" in English. Like in other Indic scripts, Odia consonants have the inherent vowel "a", and take one of several modifying vowel signs to represent syllables with another vowel or no vowel at all.

Odia Ya with vowel matras
| Jya | Jyā | Jyi | Jyī | Jyu | Jyū | Jyr̥ | Jyr̥̄ | Jyl̥ | Jyl̥̄ | Jye | Jyai | Jyo | Jyau | Jy |
|---|---|---|---|---|---|---|---|---|---|---|---|---|---|---|
| ଯ | ଯା | ଯି | ଯୀ | ଯୁ | ଯୂ | ଯୃ | ଯୄ | ଯୢ | ଯୣ | ଯେ | ଯୈ | ଯୋ | ଯୌ | ଯ୍ |

As is common in Indic scripts, Odia joins letters together to form conjunct consonant clusters. The most common conjunct formation is achieved by using a small subjoined form of trailing consonants. Most consonants' subjoined forms are identical to the full form, just reduced in size, although a few drop the curved headline or have a subjoined form not directly related to the full form of the consonant. The second type of conjunct formation is through pure ligatures, where the constituent consonants are written together in a single graphic form. ଯ generates conjuncts only by subjoining and does not form ligatures.

=== Odia Ya ===
Odia independent and subjoined letter Ya.

Ya (ୟ) is the second "Y" consonant of the Odia abugida. Unlike its relative, it retains the palatal approximant pronunciation "y". It is descended from the Brahmi and Siddhaṃ letter, the same as ଯ. Like other Odia consonants, ୟ has an inherent "a" vowel, and takes one of several modifying vowel signs to represent syllables with another vowel or no vowel at all.

Odia Yva with vowel matras
| Ya | Yā | Yi | Yī | Yu | Yū | Yr̥ | Yr̥̄ | Yl̥ | Yl̥̄ | Ye | Yai | Yo | Yau | Y |
|---|---|---|---|---|---|---|---|---|---|---|---|---|---|---|
| ୟ | ୟା | ୟି | ୟୀ | ୟୁ | ୟୂ | ୟୃ | ୟୄ | ୟୢ | ୟୣ | ୟେ | ୟୈ | ୟୋ | ୟୌ | ୟ୍ |

==== Conjuncts of ୟ ====
As is common in Indic scripts, Odia joins letters together to form conjunct consonant clusters. The most common conjunct formation is achieved by using a small subjoined form of trailing consonants. Most consonants' subjoined forms are identical to the full form, just reduced in size, although a few drop the curved headline or have a subjoined form not directly related to the full form of the consonant. The subjoined form of is unique in appearing to the right of the preceding letters, rather than below. This postfixed form of Ya is called "Ya Phala". The second type of conjunct formation is through pure ligatures, where the constituent consonants are written together in a single graphic form. This ligature may be recognizable as being a combination of two characters or it can have a conjunct ligature unrelated to its constituent characters.

- ଧ୍ (dʱ) + ୟ (ya) gives the ligature dʱya:

== Kaithi Ya ==
Kaithi consonant and half-form Ya.

Ya (𑂨) is a consonant of the Kaithi abugida. It ultimately arose from the Brahmi letter, via the Siddhaṃ letter Ya. Like in other Indic scripts, Kaithi consonants have the inherent vowel "a", and take one of several modifying vowel signs to represent syllables with another vowel or no vowel at all.

Kaithi Ya with vowel matras
| Ya | Yā | Yi | Yī | Yu | Yū | Ye | Yai | Yo | Yau | Y |
|---|---|---|---|---|---|---|---|---|---|---|
| 𑂨 | 𑂨𑂰 | 𑂨𑂱 | 𑂨𑂲 | 𑂨𑂳 | 𑂨𑂴 | 𑂨𑂵 | 𑂨𑂶 | 𑂨𑂷 | 𑂨𑂸 | 𑂨𑂹 |

=== Conjuncts of 𑂨 ===
As is common in Indic scripts, Kaithi joins letters together to form conjunct consonant clusters. The most common conjunct formation is achieved by using a half form of preceding consonants, although several consonants use an explicit virama. Most half forms are derived from the full form by removing the vertical stem. As is common in most Indic scripts, conjuncts of ra are indicated with a repha or rakar mark attached to the rest of the consonant cluster. In addition, there are a few vertical conjuncts that can be found in Kaithi writing, but true ligatures are not used in the modern Kaithi script.

- 𑂨୍ (y) + 𑂩 (ra) gives the ligature yra:
- 𑂩୍ (r) + 𑂨 (ya) gives the ligature rya:

== Tirhuta Ya ==
Tirhuta consonant Ya

Ya (𑒨) is a consonant of the Tirhuta abugida. It ultimately arose from the Brahmi letter, via the Siddhaṃ letter Ya. Like in other Indic scripts, Tirhuta consonants have the inherent vowel "a", and take one of several modifying vowel signs to represent sylables with another vowel or no vowel at all.

Tirhuta Ya with vowel matras
| Ya | Yā | Yi | Yī | Yu | Yū | ṛ | ṝ | ḷ | ḹ | Yē | Ye | Yai | Yō | Yo | Yau | Y |
|---|---|---|---|---|---|---|---|---|---|---|---|---|---|---|---|---|
| 𑒨 | 𑒨𑒰 | 𑒨𑒱 | 𑒨𑒲 | 𑒨𑒳 | 𑒨𑒴 | 𑒨𑒵 | 𑒨𑒶 | 𑒨𑒷 | 𑒨𑒸 | 𑒨𑒹 | 𑒨𑒺 | 𑒨𑒻 | 𑒨𑒼 | 𑒨𑒽 | 𑒨𑒾 | 𑒨𑓂 |

=== Conjuncts of 𑒨 ===
As is common in Indic scripts, Tirhuta joins letters together to form conjunct consonant clusters. The most common conjunct formation is achieved by using an explicit virama. As is common in most Indic scripts, conjuncts of ra are indicated with a repha or rakar mark attached to the rest of the consonant cluster. In addition, other consonants take unique combining forms when in conjunct with other letters, and there are several vertical conjuncts and true ligatures that can be found in Tirhuta writing.

- 𑒠୍ (d) + 𑒨 (ya) gives the ligature dya:

- 𑒯୍ (h) + 𑒨 (ya) gives the ligature hya:

- 𑒢୍ (n) + 𑒨 (ya) gives the ligature nya:

- 𑒩୍ (r) + 𑒨 (ya) gives the ligature rya:

- 𑒬୍ (ʃ) + 𑒨 (ya) gives the ligature ʃya:

- 𑒮୍ (s) + 𑒨 (ya) gives the ligature sya:

- 𑒞୍ (t) + 𑒨 (ya) gives the ligature tya:

- 𑒨୍ (y) + 𑒩 (ra) gives the ligature yra:

- 𑒨 (y) + 𑒅 (u) gives the ligature yu:

- 𑒨୍ (y) + 𑒫 (va) gives the ligature yva:

== Comparison of Ya ==
The various Indic scripts are generally related to each other through adaptation and borrowing, and as such the glyphs for cognate letters, including Ya, are related as well.

Comparison of Ya in different scripts

Aramaic
Kharoṣṭhī 𐨩 | Ashoka Brahmi | Kushana Brahmi (Note: The middle "Kushana" form of Brahmi is a later style that emerged as Brahmi scripts were beginning to proliferate. Gupta Brahmi was definitely a stylistic descendant from Kushana, but other Brahmi-derived scripts may have descended from earlier forms.) | Tocharian (Note: Tocharian is probably derived from the middle period "Kushana" form of Brahmi, although artifacts from that time are not plentiful enough to establish a definite succession.)
Gupta Brahmi | Pallava
Kadamba -
Bhaiksuki 𑰧 | Siddhaṃ | Grantha 𑌯 | Cham ꨢ
Sinhala ය | Pyu / Old Mon (Note: Pyu and Old Mon are probably the precursors of the Burmese script, and may be derived from either the Pallava or Kadamba script) -
Tibetan | Newa 𑐫 | Ahom - | Malayalam യ
Telugu య | Burmese ယ
Lepcha ᰚ | Ranjana | Saurashtra ꢫ | Dives Akuru 𑤥
Kannada ಯ | Kayah Li ꤛ
Limbu ᤕ | Soyombo (Note: May also be derived from Devangari (see bottom left of table)) 𑩻 | Khmer យ | Tamil
Chakma 𑄠 | Tai Tham ᨿ / ᩀ
Meitei Mayek ꯌ | Gaudi - | Thai ย | Lao ຍ / ຽ / ໟ / ຢ
Tai Le ᥕ
Marchen 𑲉 | Tirhuta 𑒨 | New Tai Lue ᦍ / ᦊ | Tai Viet ꪤ / ꪥ | Aksara Kawi
'Phags-pa ꡗ | Odia ଯ | Sharada 𑆪 | Rejang ꤿ | Batak ᯛ | Buginese ᨐ
Zanabazar Square 𑨪 | Bengali–Assamese | Takri 𑚣 | Javanese ꦪ | Balinese ᬬ | Makasar 𑻬
Hangul (Note: The Origin of Hangul from 'Phags-pa is one of limited influence, inspiring at most a few basic letter shapes. Hangul does not function as an Indic abugida.) - | Northern Nagari - | Dogri 𑠣 | Laṇḍā - | Sundanese ᮚ | Baybayin ᜌ
Modi 𑘧 | Gujarati ય | Khojki 𑈥 | Khudabadi 𑋘 | Mahajani - | Tagbanwa ᝬ
Devanagari | Nandinagari 𑧇 | Kaithi | Gurmukhi ਯ | Multani 𑊡 | Buhid ᝌ
Canadian Syllabics (Note: Although the basic letter forms of the Canadian Aboriginal Syllabics were derived from handwritten Devanagari letters, this abugida indicates vowel sounds by rotations of the letter form, rather than the use of vowel diacritics as is standard in Indic abugidas.) ᔦ | Soyombo (Note: May also be derived from Ranjana (see above)) 𑩻 | Sylheti Nagari - | Gunjala Gondi 𑵬 | Masaram Gondi (Note: Masaram Gondi acts as an Indic abugida, but its letterforms were not derived from any single precursor script.) 𑴥 | Hanuno'o ᜬ

== Character encodings of Ya ==
Most Indic scripts are encoded in the Unicode Standard, and as such the letter Ya in those scripts can be represented in plain text with unique codepoint. Ya from several modern-use scripts can also be found in legacy encodings, such as ISCII.

Character information
| Preview | | | | | | | య | | ଯ | | ಯ | | യ | | ય | | ਯ | |
|---|---|---|---|---|---|---|---|---|---|---|---|---|---|---|---|---|---|---|
| Unicode name | DEVANAGARI LETTER YA | | BENGALI LETTER YA | | TAMIL LETTER YA | | TELUGU LETTER YA | | ORIYA LETTER YA | | KANNADA LETTER YA | | MALAYALAM LETTER YA | | GUJARATI LETTER YA | | GURMUKHI LETTER YA | |
| Encodings | decimal | hex | dec | hex | dec | hex | dec | hex | dec | hex | dec | hex | dec | hex | dec | hex | dec | hex |
| Unicode | 2351 | U+092F | 2479 | U+09AF | 2991 | U+0BAF | 3119 | U+0C2F | 2863 | U+0B2F | 3247 | U+0CAF | 3375 | U+0D2F | 2735 | U+0AAF | 2607 | U+0A2F |
| UTF-8 | 224 164 175 | E0 A4 AF | 224 166 175 | E0 A6 AF | 224 174 175 | E0 AE AF | 224 176 175 | E0 B0 AF | 224 172 175 | E0 AC AF | 224 178 175 | E0 B2 AF | 224 180 175 | E0 B4 AF | 224 170 175 | E0 AA AF | 224 168 175 | E0 A8 AF |
| Numeric character reference | &#2351; | &#x92F; | &#2479; | &#x9AF; | &#2991; | &#xBAF; | &#3119; | &#xC2F; | &#2863; | &#xB2F; | &#3247; | &#xCAF; | &#3375; | &#xD2F; | &#2735; | &#xAAF; | &#2607; | &#xA2F; |
| ISCII | 205 | CD | 205 | CD | 205 | CD | 205 | CD | 205 | CD | 205 | CD | 205 | CD | 205 | CD | 205 | CD |

Character information
| Preview | Ashoka Kushana Gupta | | 𐨩 | | | | 𑌯 | |
|---|---|---|---|---|---|---|---|---|
| Unicode name | BRAHMI LETTER YA | | KHAROSHTHI LETTER YA | | SIDDHAM LETTER YA | | GRANTHA LETTER YA | |
| Encodings | decimal | hex | dec | hex | dec | hex | dec | hex |
| Unicode | 69676 | U+1102C | 68137 | U+10A29 | 71079 | U+115A7 | 70447 | U+1132F |
| UTF-8 | 240 145 128 172 | F0 91 80 AC | 240 144 168 169 | F0 90 A8 A9 | 240 145 150 167 | F0 91 96 A7 | 240 145 140 175 | F0 91 8C AF |
| UTF-16 | 55300 56364 | D804 DC2C | 55298 56873 | D802 DE29 | 55301 56743 | D805 DDA7 | 55300 57135 | D804 DF2F |
| Numeric character reference | &#69676; | &#x1102C; | &#68137; | &#x10A29; | &#71079; | &#x115A7; | &#70447; | &#x1132F; |

Character information
| Preview | | | ྱ | | ꡗ | | 𑨪 | | 𑐫 | | 𑰧 | | 𑆪 | |
|---|---|---|---|---|---|---|---|---|---|---|---|---|---|---|
| Unicode name | TIBETAN LETTER YA | | TIBETAN SUBJOINED LETTER YA | | PHAGS-PA LETTER YA | | ZANABAZAR SQUARE LETTER YA | | NEWA LETTER YA | | BHAIKSUKI LETTER YA | | SHARADA LETTER YA | |
| Encodings | decimal | hex | dec | hex | dec | hex | dec | hex | dec | hex | dec | hex | dec | hex |
| Unicode | 3937 | U+0F61 | 4017 | U+0FB1 | 43095 | U+A857 | 72234 | U+11A2A | 70699 | U+1142B | 72743 | U+11C27 | 70058 | U+111AA |
| UTF-8 | 224 189 161 | E0 BD A1 | 224 190 177 | E0 BE B1 | 234 161 151 | EA A1 97 | 240 145 168 170 | F0 91 A8 AA | 240 145 144 171 | F0 91 90 AB | 240 145 176 167 | F0 91 B0 A7 | 240 145 134 170 | F0 91 86 AA |
| UTF-16 | 3937 | 0F61 | 4017 | 0FB1 | 43095 | A857 | 55302 56874 | D806 DE2A | 55301 56363 | D805 DC2B | 55303 56359 | D807 DC27 | 55300 56746 | D804 DDAA |
| Numeric character reference | &#3937; | &#xF61; | &#4017; | &#xFB1; | &#43095; | &#xA857; | &#72234; | &#x11A2A; | &#70699; | &#x1142B; | &#72743; | &#x11C27; | &#70058; | &#x111AA; |

Character information
| Preview | ယ | | ᨿ | | ᩀ | | ᩭ | | ᦍ | | ᦊ | |
|---|---|---|---|---|---|---|---|---|---|---|---|---|
| Unicode name | MYANMAR LETTER YA | | TAI THAM LETTER LOW YA | | TAI THAM LETTER HIGH YA | | TAI THAM VOWEL SIGN OY | | NEW TAI LUE LETTER LOW YA | | NEW TAI LUE LETTER HIGH YA | |
| Encodings | decimal | hex | dec | hex | dec | hex | dec | hex | dec | hex | dec | hex |
| Unicode | 4122 | U+101A | 6719 | U+1A3F | 6720 | U+1A40 | 6765 | U+1A6D | 6541 | U+198D | 6538 | U+198A |
| UTF-8 | 225 128 154 | E1 80 9A | 225 168 191 | E1 A8 BF | 225 169 128 | E1 A9 80 | 225 169 173 | E1 A9 AD | 225 166 141 | E1 A6 8D | 225 166 138 | E1 A6 8A |
| Numeric character reference | &#4122; | &#x101A; | &#6719; | &#x1A3F; | &#6720; | &#x1A40; | &#6765; | &#x1A6D; | &#6541; | &#x198D; | &#6538; | &#x198A; |

Character information
| Preview | យ | | ย | | ꪤ | | ꪥ | |
|---|---|---|---|---|---|---|---|---|
| Unicode name | KHMER LETTER YO | | THAI CHARACTER YO YAK | | TAI VIET LETTER LOW YO | | TAI VIET LETTER HIGH YO | |
| Encodings | decimal | hex | dec | hex | dec | hex | dec | hex |
| Unicode | 6041 | U+1799 | 3618 | U+0E22 | 43684 | U+AAA4 | 43685 | U+AAA5 |
| UTF-8 | 225 158 153 | E1 9E 99 | 224 184 162 | E0 B8 A2 | 234 170 164 | EA AA A4 | 234 170 165 | EA AA A5 |
| Numeric character reference | &#6041; | &#x1799; | &#3618; | &#xE22; | &#43684; | &#xAAA4; | &#43685; | &#xAAA5; |

- See further below for Lao codepoints.

Character information
| Preview | ය | | ꤛ | | 𑄠 | | 𑄡 | | ᥕ | | 𑤥 | | ꢫ | | ꨢ | |
|---|---|---|---|---|---|---|---|---|---|---|---|---|---|---|---|---|
| Unicode name | SINHALA LETTER YAYANNA | | KAYAH LI LETTER YA | | CHAKMA LETTER YYAA | | CHAKMA LETTER YAA | | TAI LE LETTER YA | | DIVES AKURU LETTER YA | | SAURASHTRA LETTER YA | | CHAM LETTER YA | |
| Encodings | decimal | hex | dec | hex | dec | hex | dec | hex | dec | hex | dec | hex | dec | hex | dec | hex |
| Unicode | 3514 | U+0DBA | 43291 | U+A91B | 69920 | U+11120 | 69921 | U+11121 | 6485 | U+1955 | 71973 | U+11925 | 43179 | U+A8AB | 43554 | U+AA22 |
| UTF-8 | 224 182 186 | E0 B6 BA | 234 164 155 | EA A4 9B | 240 145 132 160 | F0 91 84 A0 | 240 145 132 161 | F0 91 84 A1 | 225 165 149 | E1 A5 95 | 240 145 164 165 | F0 91 A4 A5 | 234 162 171 | EA A2 AB | 234 168 162 | EA A8 A2 |
| UTF-16 | 3514 | 0DBA | 43291 | A91B | 55300 56608 | D804 DD20 | 55300 56609 | D804 DD21 | 6485 | 1955 | 55302 56613 | D806 DD25 | 43179 | A8AB | 43554 | AA22 |
| Numeric character reference | &#3514; | &#xDBA; | &#43291; | &#xA91B; | &#69920; | &#x11120; | &#69921; | &#x11121; | &#6485; | &#x1955; | &#71973; | &#x11925; | &#43179; | &#xA8AB; | &#43554; | &#xAA22; |

Character information
| Preview | 𑘧 | | 𑧇 | | 𑩻 | | 𑵬 | | | |
|---|---|---|---|---|---|---|---|---|---|---|
| Unicode name | MODI LETTER YA | | NANDINAGARI LETTER YA | | SOYOMBO LETTER YA | | GUNJALA GONDI LETTER YA | | KAITHI LETTER YA | |
| Encodings | decimal | hex | dec | hex | dec | hex | dec | hex | dec | hex |
| Unicode | 71207 | U+11627 | 72135 | U+119C7 | 72315 | U+11A7B | 73068 | U+11D6C | 69800 | U+110A8 |
| UTF-8 | 240 145 152 167 | F0 91 98 A7 | 240 145 167 135 | F0 91 A7 87 | 240 145 169 187 | F0 91 A9 BB | 240 145 181 172 | F0 91 B5 AC | 240 145 130 168 | F0 91 82 A8 |
| UTF-16 | 55301 56871 | D805 DE27 | 55302 56775 | D806 DDC7 | 55302 56955 | D806 DE7B | 55303 56684 | D807 DD6C | 55300 56488 | D804 DCA8 |
| Numeric character reference | &#71207; | &#x11627; | &#72135; | &#x119C7; | &#72315; | &#x11A7B; | &#73068; | &#x11D6C; | &#69800; | &#x110A8; |

Character information
| Preview | 𑒨 | | ᰚ | | ᤕ | | ꯌ | | 𑲉 | |
|---|---|---|---|---|---|---|---|---|---|---|
| Unicode name | TIRHUTA LETTER YA | | LEPCHA LETTER YA | | LIMBU LETTER YA | | MEETEI MAYEK LETTER YANG | | MARCHEN LETTER YA | |
| Encodings | decimal | hex | dec | hex | dec | hex | dec | hex | dec | hex |
| Unicode | 70824 | U+114A8 | 7194 | U+1C1A | 6421 | U+1915 | 43980 | U+ABCC | 72841 | U+11C89 |
| UTF-8 | 240 145 146 168 | F0 91 92 A8 | 225 176 154 | E1 B0 9A | 225 164 149 | E1 A4 95 | 234 175 140 | EA AF 8C | 240 145 178 137 | F0 91 B2 89 |
| UTF-16 | 55301 56488 | D805 DCA8 | 7194 | 1C1A | 6421 | 1915 | 43980 | ABCC | 55303 56457 | D807 DC89 |
| Numeric character reference | &#70824; | &#x114A8; | &#7194; | &#x1C1A; | &#6421; | &#x1915; | &#43980; | &#xABCC; | &#72841; | &#x11C89; |

Character information
| Preview | 𑚣 | | 𑠣 | | 𑈥 | | 𑋘 | | 𑊡 | |
|---|---|---|---|---|---|---|---|---|---|---|
| Unicode name | TAKRI LETTER YA | | DOGRA LETTER YA | | KHOJKI LETTER YA | | KHUDAWADI LETTER YA | | MULTANI LETTER YA | |
| Encodings | decimal | hex | dec | hex | dec | hex | dec | hex | dec | hex |
| Unicode | 71331 | U+116A3 | 71715 | U+11823 | 70181 | U+11225 | 70360 | U+112D8 | 70305 | U+112A1 |
| UTF-8 | 240 145 154 163 | F0 91 9A A3 | 240 145 160 163 | F0 91 A0 A3 | 240 145 136 165 | F0 91 88 A5 | 240 145 139 152 | F0 91 8B 98 | 240 145 138 161 | F0 91 8A A1 |
| UTF-16 | 55301 56995 | D805 DEA3 | 55302 56355 | D806 DC23 | 55300 56869 | D804 DE25 | 55300 57048 | D804 DED8 | 55300 56993 | D804 DEA1 |
| Numeric character reference | &#71331; | &#x116A3; | &#71715; | &#x11823; | &#70181; | &#x11225; | &#70360; | &#x112D8; | &#70305; | &#x112A1; |

Character information
| Preview | ᬬ | | ᯛ | | ᨐ | | ꦪ | | 𑻬 | | ꤿ | | ᮚ | |
|---|---|---|---|---|---|---|---|---|---|---|---|---|---|---|
| Unicode name | BALINESE LETTER YA | | BATAK LETTER YA | | BUGINESE LETTER YA | | JAVANESE LETTER YA | | MAKASAR LETTER YA | | REJANG LETTER YA | | SUNDANESE LETTER YA | |
| Encodings | decimal | hex | dec | hex | dec | hex | dec | hex | dec | hex | dec | hex | dec | hex |
| Unicode | 6956 | U+1B2C | 7131 | U+1BDB | 6672 | U+1A10 | 43434 | U+A9AA | 73452 | U+11EEC | 43327 | U+A93F | 7066 | U+1B9A |
| UTF-8 | 225 172 172 | E1 AC AC | 225 175 155 | E1 AF 9B | 225 168 144 | E1 A8 90 | 234 166 170 | EA A6 AA | 240 145 187 172 | F0 91 BB AC | 234 164 191 | EA A4 BF | 225 174 154 | E1 AE 9A |
| UTF-16 | 6956 | 1B2C | 7131 | 1BDB | 6672 | 1A10 | 43434 | A9AA | 55303 57068 | D807 DEEC | 43327 | A93F | 7066 | 1B9A |
| Numeric character reference | &#6956; | &#x1B2C; | &#7131; | &#x1BDB; | &#6672; | &#x1A10; | &#43434; | &#xA9AA; | &#73452; | &#x11EEC; | &#43327; | &#xA93F; | &#7066; | &#x1B9A; |

Character information
| Preview | ᜌ | | ᝬ | | ᝌ | | ᜬ | | 𑴥 | |
|---|---|---|---|---|---|---|---|---|---|---|
| Unicode name | TAGALOG LETTER YA | | TAGBANWA LETTER YA | | BUHID LETTER YA | | HANUNOO LETTER YA | | MASARAM GONDI LETTER YA | |
| Encodings | decimal | hex | dec | hex | dec | hex | dec | hex | dec | hex |
| Unicode | 5900 | U+170C | 5996 | U+176C | 5964 | U+174C | 5932 | U+172C | 72997 | U+11D25 |
| UTF-8 | 225 156 140 | E1 9C 8C | 225 157 172 | E1 9D AC | 225 157 140 | E1 9D 8C | 225 156 172 | E1 9C AC | 240 145 180 165 | F0 91 B4 A5 |
| UTF-16 | 5900 | 170C | 5996 | 176C | 5964 | 174C | 5932 | 172C | 55303 56613 | D807 DD25 |
| Numeric character reference | &#5900; | &#x170C; | &#5996; | &#x176C; | &#5964; | &#x174C; | &#5932; | &#x172C; | &#72997; | &#x11D25; |

Character information
| Preview | ᔦ | | ᔨ | | ᔪ | | ᔭ | | ᔾ | |
|---|---|---|---|---|---|---|---|---|---|---|
| Unicode name | CANADIAN SYLLABICS YE | | CANADIAN SYLLABICS YI | | CANADIAN SYLLABICS YO | | CANADIAN SYLLABICS YA | | CANADIAN SYLLABICS Y | |
| Encodings | decimal | hex | dec | hex | dec | hex | dec | hex | dec | hex |
| Unicode | 5414 | U+1526 | 5416 | U+1528 | 5418 | U+152A | 5421 | U+152D | 5438 | U+153E |
| UTF-8 | 225 148 166 | E1 94 A6 | 225 148 168 | E1 94 A8 | 225 148 170 | E1 94 AA | 225 148 173 | E1 94 AD | 225 148 190 | E1 94 BE |
| Numeric character reference | &#5414; | &#x1526; | &#5416; | &#x1528; | &#5418; | &#x152A; | &#5421; | &#x152D; | &#5438; | &#x153E; |

- The full range of yE Canadian syllabic characters can be found at the codepoint ranges 1526-153E, 141E, 142B-142E, 18B0-18B3, 18DC-18DD.

Character information
| Preview | ຍ | | ຽ | | ໟ | | ຢ | |
|---|---|---|---|---|---|---|---|---|
| Unicode name | LAO LETTER NYO | | LAO SEMIVOWEL SIGN NYO | | LAO LETTER KHMU NYO | | LAO LETTER YO | |
| Encodings | decimal | hex | dec | hex | dec | hex | dec | hex |
| Unicode | 3725 | U+0E8D | 3773 | U+0EBD | 3807 | U+0EDF | 3746 | U+0EA2 |
| UTF-8 | 224 186 141 | E0 BA 8D | 224 186 189 | E0 BA BD | 224 187 159 | E0 BB 9F | 224 186 162 | E0 BA A2 |
| Numeric character reference | &#3725; | &#xE8D; | &#3773; | &#xEBD; | &#3807; | &#xEDF; | &#3746; | &#xEA2; |
