= Multani (Unicode block) =

- Range: U+11280..U+112AF (48 code points)
- Plane: SMP
- Scripts: Multani
- Major alphabets: Multani
- Assigned: 38 code points
- Unused: 10 reserved code points

Unicode version history
- 8.0 (2015): 38 (+38)

Unicode documentation
- Code chart ∣ Web page

Multani is a Unicode block containing characters used for writing the Multani alphabet, a Brahmic script used in the Multan region of Punjab and in northern Sindh in Pakistan. The script is now obsolete, but was historically used to write the Saraiki language.

Multani^{[1]}^{[2]} Official Unicode Consortium code chart (PDF)
| | 0 | 1 | 2 | 3 | 4 | 5 | 6 | 7 | 8 | 9 | A | B | C | D | E | F |
| U+1128x | 𑊀 | 𑊁 | 𑊂 | 𑊃 | 𑊄 | 𑊅 | 𑊆 | | 𑊈 | | 𑊊 | 𑊋 | 𑊌 | 𑊍 | | 𑊏 |
| U+1129x | 𑊐 | 𑊑 | 𑊒 | 𑊓 | 𑊔 | 𑊕 | 𑊖 | 𑊗 | 𑊘 | 𑊙 | 𑊚 | 𑊛 | 𑊜 | 𑊝 | | 𑊟 |
| U+112Ax | 𑊠 | 𑊡 | 𑊢 | 𑊣 | 𑊤 | 𑊥 | 𑊦 | 𑊧 | 𑊨 | 𑊩 | | | | | | |
Notes: 1. As of Unicode version 17.0; 2. Grey areas indicate non-assigned code points

== History ==
The following Unicode-related documents record the purpose and process of defining specific characters in the Multani block:

| Version | Final code points (Note: Proposed code points and characters names may differ from final code points and names) | Count | L2 ID | WG2 ID | Document |
|---|---|---|---|---|---|
| 8.0 | U+11280..11286, 11288, 1128A..1128D, 1128F..1129D, 1129F..112A9 | 38 | L2/10-011R | N3766 | Pandey, Anshuman (2010-02-09), A Roadmap for Scripts of the Landa Family |
| 8.0 | U+11280..11286, 11288, 1128A..1128D, 1128F..1129D, 1129F..112A9 | 38 | L2/10-013 | N3768 | Pandey, Anshuman (2010-02-09), Preliminary Proposal to Encode the Landa Script in ISO/IEC 10646 |
| 8.0 | U+11280..11286, 11288, 1128A..1128D, 1128F..1129D, 1129F..112A9 | 38 | L2/11-124 | N4027 | Pandey, Anshuman (2011-04-26), Preliminary Proposal to Encode the Multani Script |
| 8.0 | U+11280..11286, 11288, 1128A..1128D, 1128F..1129D, 1129F..112A9 | 38 | L2/12-316 | N4159 | Pandey, Anshuman (2012-09-25), Proposal to Encode the Multani Script in ISO/IEC 10646 |
| 8.0 | U+11280..11286, 11288, 1128A..1128D, 1128F..1129D, 1129F..112A9 | 38 | L2/12-343R2 | | Moore, Lisa (2012-12-04), "Consensus 133-C20", UTC #133 Minutes |
| 8.0 | U+11280..11286, 11288, 1128A..1128D, 1128F..1129D, 1129F..112A9 | 38 | | N4353 (pdf, doc) | "M60.10", Unconfirmed minutes of WG 2 meeting 60, 2013-05-23 |
