= A (Indic) =

Letter "A" in Indic scripts

Example glyphs
- Bengali–Assamese: অ
- Tibetan: ཨ
- Tamil: அ
- Thai: อ
- Malayalam: അ
- Sinhala: අ
- Ashoka Brahmi: A
- Devanagari: &#xअ;

Cognates
- Hebrew: א
- Greek: Α
- Latin: A, Ɑ
- Cyrillic: А, Я, Ҍ

Properties
- Phonemic representation: /ɐ/ /ə/ /ɔ/ /ʔ/^{D} /ɔː/^{E} /ɑː/^{F}
- IAST transliteration: a A
- ISCII code point: A4 (164)
- ^D in Thai^E in Thai^F in Khmer

A is a vowel of Indic abugidas. In modern Indic scripts, A is derived from the early "Ashoka" Brahmi letter after having gone through the Gupta letter. Bare consonants without a modifying vowel sign have the "A" vowel inherently, and thus there is no modifier sign for "A" in Indic scripts.

== Āryabhaṭa numeration ==
Aryabhata used Devanagari letters for numbers, very similar to the Greek numerals, even after the invention of Indian numerals. The letter अ was not used in the Aryabhata number system, and consonants with the inherent "a" vowel retained their base value.

== Historic A ==
There are three different general early historic scripts - Brahmi and its variants, Kharoṣṭhī, and Tocharian, the so-called slanting Brahmi. A as found in standard Brahmi, was a simple geometric shape, with variations toward more flowing forms by the Gupta. Like all Brahmic scripts, the Tocharian A is the inherent vowel for all consonant characters, apart from the alternate Fremdzeichen forms, which have the inherent vowel "Ä". In Kharoṣṭhī, the only independent vowel letter is for the inherent A, with all other independent vowels built from vowel marks added to A.

=== Brahmi A ===
The Brahmi letter, A, is probably derived from the Aramaic Alef, and is thus related to the modern Latin A and Greek Alpha. Several identifiable styles of writing the Brahmi A can be found, most associated with a specific set of inscriptions from an artifact or diverse records from an historic period. As the earliest and most geometric style of Brahmi, the letters found on the Edicts of Ashoka and other records from around that time are normally the reference form for Brahmi letters, with vowel marks not attested until later forms of Brahmi back-formed to match the geometric writing style.

Brahmi A historic forms
Ashoka (3rd-1st c. BCE)	Girnar (~150 BCE)	Kushana (~150-250 CE)	Gujarat (~250 CE)	Gupta (~350 CE)

=== Tocharian A ===
The Tocharian letter is derived from the Brahmi.

A is the inherent vowel of all non-Fremdzeichen consonants in Tocharian
Ka	Kha	Ga	Gha	Ca	Cha	Ja	Jha	Nya	Ṭa	Ṭha	Ḍa	Ḍha	Ṇa
Ta	Tha	Da	Dha	Na	Pa	Pha	Ba	Bha	Ma	Ya	Ra	La	Va
Śa	Ṣa	Sa	Ha										

=== Kharoṣṭhī A ===
The Kharoṣṭhī letter A is the only independent vowel in Kharosthi. It is derived from the Aramaic Alef, and is thus related to A and Alpha, as well as the Brahmi A.

== Devanagari A ==
Devanagari A vowel

Devanagari A vowel (old)

A (अ) is a vowel of the Devanagari abugida. It ultimately arose from the Brahmi letter, after having gone through the Gupta letter. Letters that derive from it are the Gujarati letter અ, and the Modi letter 𑘀.

=== Devanagari Using Languages ===
The Devanagari script is used to write the Hindi language, Sanskrit and many other Indo-Aryan languages. In most of these languages, अ is pronounced as [ə]. Like all Indic scripts, Devanagari vowels come in two forms: an independent vowel form for syllables that begin with a vowel sound. However, since /ə/ is the inherent vowel of all consonants, there is no need for an A vowel sign.

== Bengali A ==
Bengali A vowel

A (অ) is a vowel of the Bengali abugida. It is derived from the Siddhaṃ letter, and is marked by a similar horizontal head line, but less geometric shape, than its Devanagari counterpart, अ.

=== Bengali Script Using Languages ===
The Bengali script is used to write several languages of eastern India, notably the Bengali language and Assamese. In most languages, অ is pronounced as [ɔ]. Like all Indic scripts, Bengali vowels come in two forms: an independent vowel form for syllables that begin with a vowel sound. However, Bengali A represents the /ɔ/ vowel inherent in all consonants, and is thus indicated by the lack of any modifying vowel sign.

== Maithili A ==
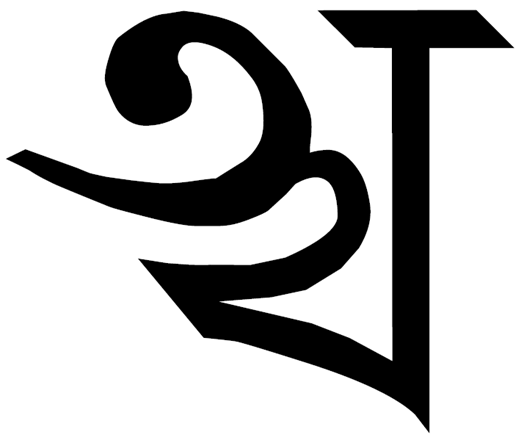

== Gujarati A ==
Gujarati independent A vowel.

A (અ) is a vowel of the Gujarati abugida. It is derived from the Devanagari A, and ultimately the Brahmi letter.

=== Gujarati-using Languages ===
The Gujarati script is used to write the Gujarati and Kutchi languages. In both languages, અ is pronounced as [ə]. Like all Indic scripts, Gujarati vowels usually come in two forms: an independent vowel form for syllables that begin with a vowel sound and a vowel sign attached to base consonant to override the inherent vowel. However, since A is the inherent vowel in unmarked consonants, there is no A vowel sign in Gujarati.

== Telugu A ==
Telugu independent vowel A

A (అ) is a vowel of the Telugu abugida. It ultimately arose from the Brahmi letter. It is closely related to the Kannada letter ಅ. Like in other Indic scripts, "A" in Telugu is inherent in all consonants, and there is no vowel sign for the "A" vowel.

== Malayalam A ==
Malayalam independent vowel A

A (അ) is a vowel of the Malayalam abugida. It ultimately arose from the Brahmi letter, via the Grantha letter a. Like in other Indic scripts, "A" is the inherent vowel of Malayalam consonants, so there is no modifying vowel sign for A. As in most Indic scripts, independent Malayalam vowels do not decompose into A with a vowel sign attached, but rather are unique characters themselves. Independent vowel letters in Malayalam are used when a word begins with a vowel, rather than a consonant sound.

== Odia A ==
Odia A vowel

A (ଅ) is a vowel of the Odia abugida. It ultimately arose from the Brahmi letter, via the Siddhaṃ letter a. Like in other Indic scripts, Odia consonants inherently contain the "a" vowel, so there is no modifying sign for indicating that vowel.

== Thai script ==
O ang (อ) and Ho nokhuk (ฮ) are the forty-third and forty-fourth letters of the Thai script. Unlike many Indic scripts, Thai consonants do not form conjunct ligatures, and use the pinthu—an explicit virama with a dot shape—to indicate bare consonants.

=== O ang ===
In IPA, O ang is pronounced as [ʔ] at the beginning of a syllable and not be used to close a syllable. It falls under the middle class of Thai consonants. In the acrophony of the Thai script, ang (อ่าง) means 'basin'. O ang corresponds to the Sanskrit character 'अ'.

=== Ho nokhuk ===
In IPA, Ho nokhuk is pronounced as [h] at the beginning of a syllable and not be used to close a syllable. It falls under the low class of Thai consonants. In the acrophony of the Thai script, nokhuk (นกฮูก) means 'owl'.

== Kaithi A ==
Kaithi independent vowel A.

A (𑂃) is a vowel of the Kaithi abugida. It ultimately arose from the Brahmi letter, via the Siddhaṃ letter A. Like in other Indic scripts, the Kaithi vowel A is an independent letter and lacks a vowel sign, as "a" is inherent to the consonant letters.

== Comparison of A ==
The various Indic scripts are generally related to each other through adaptation and borrowing, and as such the glyphs for cognate letters, including A, are related as well.

Comparison of A in different scripts

Aramaic
Kharoṣṭhī 𐨀	Ashoka Brahmi	Kushana Brahmi (Note: The middle "Kushana" form of Brahmi is a later style that emerged as Brahmi scripts were beginning to proliferate. Gupta Brahmi was definitely a stylistic descendant from Kushana, but other Brahmi-derived scripts may have descended from earlier forms.)	Tocharian (Note: Tocharian is probably derived from the middle period "Kushana" form of Brahmi, although artifacts from that time are not plentiful enough to establish a definite succession.)
Gupta Brahmi	Pallava
Kadamba -
Bhaiksuki 𑰀	Siddhaṃ	Grantha 𑌅	Cham ꨀ
Sinhala අ	Pyu / Old Mon (Note: Pyu and Old Mon are probably the precursors of the Burmese script, and may be derived from either the Pallava or Kadamba script) -
Tibetan	Newa 𑐀	Ahom 𑜒	Malayalam അ
Telugu అ	Burmese အ
Lepcha ᰣ	Ranjana	Saurashtra ꢂ	Dives Akuru 𑤀
Kannada ಅ	Kayah Li ꤢ
Limbu ᤀᤠ	Soyombo (Note: May also be derived from Devangari (see bottom left of table)) 𑩐	Khmer អ	Tamil
Chakma 𑄃𑄧	Tai Tham ᩋ
Meitei Mayek ꯑ	Gaudi -	Thai อ / ฮ	Lao ອ
Tai Le ᥣ
Marchen 𑲏	Tirhuta 𑒁	New Tai Lue ᦀ	Tai Viet ꪮ / ꪯ	Aksara Kawi 𑼄
'Phags-pa ꡝ	Odia ଅ	Sharada 𑆃	Rejang ꥆ	Batak ᯀ	Buginese ᨕ
Zanabazar Square 𑨀	Bengali–Assamese	Takri 𑚀	Javanese ꦄ	Balinese ᬅ	Makasar 𑻱
Hangul (Note: The Origin of Hangul from 'Phags-pa is one of limited influence, inspiring at most a few basic letter shapes. Hangul does not function as an Indic abugida.) -	Northern Nagari -	Dogri 𑠀	Laṇḍā -	Sundanese ᮃ	Baybayin ᜀ
Modi 𑘀	Gujarati અ	Khojki 𑈀	Khudabadi 𑊰	Mahajani 𑅐	Tagbanwa ᝠ
Devanagari	Nandinagari 𑦠	Kaithi	Gurmukhi ਅ	Multani 𑊀	Buhid ᝀ
Canadian Syllabics (Note: Although the basic letter forms of the Canadian Aboriginal Syllabics were derived from handwritten Devanagari letters, this abugida indicates vowel sounds by rotations of the letter form, rather than the use of vowel diacritics as is standard in Indic abugidas.) -	Soyombo (Note: May also be derived from Ranjana (see above)) 𑩐	Sylheti Nagari ꠀ	Gunjala Gondi 𑵠	Masaram Gondi (Note: Masaram Gondi acts as an Indic abugida, but its letterforms were not derived from any single precursor script.) 𑴀	Hanuno'o ᜠ

== Character encodings of A ==
Most Indic scripts are encoded in the Unicode Standard, and as such the letter A in those scripts can be represented in plain text with unique codepoint. A from several modern-use scripts can also be found in legacy encodings, such as ISCII.

Character information
Preview							అ		ଅ		ಅ		അ		અ		ਅ	
Unicode name	GURMUKHI LETTER A		BENGALI LETTER A		TAMIL LETTER A		TELUGU LETTER A		ORIYA LETTER A		KANNADA LETTER A		MALAYALAM LETTER A		GUJARATI LETTER A		GURMUKHI LETTER A	
Encodings	decimal	hex	dec	hex	dec	hex	dec	hex	dec	hex	dec	hex	dec	hex	dec	hex	dec	hex
Unicode	2565	U+0A05	2437	U+0985	2949	U+0B85	3077	U+0C05	2821	U+0B05	3205	U+0C85	3333	U+0D05	2693	U+0A85	2565	U+0A05
UTF-8	224 168 133	E0 A8 85	224 166 133	E0 A6 85	224 174 133	E0 AE 85	224 176 133	E0 B0 85	224 172 133	E0 AC 85	224 178 133	E0 B2 85	224 180 133	E0 B4 85	224 170 133	E0 AA 85	224 168 133	E0 A8 85
Numeric character reference	&#2565;	&#xA05;	&#2437;	&#x985;	&#2949;	&#xB85;	&#3077;	&#xC05;	&#2821;	&#xB05;	&#3205;	&#xC85;	&#3333;	&#xD05;	&#2693;	&#xA85;	&#2565;	&#xA05;
ISCII	164	A4	164	A4	164	A4	164	A4	164	A4	164	A4	164	A4	164	A4	164	A4

Character information
Preview	Ashoka Kushana Gupta		𐨀				𑌅	
Unicode name	BRAHMI LETTER A		KHAROSHTHI LETTER A		SIDDHAM LETTER A		GRANTHA LETTER A	
Encodings	decimal	hex	dec	hex	dec	hex	dec	hex
Unicode	69637	U+11005	68096	U+10A00	71040	U+11580	70405	U+11305
UTF-8	240 145 128 133	F0 91 80 85	240 144 168 128	F0 90 A8 80	240 145 150 128	F0 91 96 80	240 145 140 133	F0 91 8C 85
UTF-16	55300 56325	D804 DC05	55298 56832	D802 DE00	55301 56704	D805 DD80	55300 57093	D804 DF05
Numeric character reference	&#69637;	&#x11005;	&#68096;	&#x10A00;	&#71040;	&#x11580;	&#70405;	&#x11305;

Character information
Preview			ꡝ		𑨀		𑐀		𑰀		𑆃	
Unicode name	TIBETAN LETTER A		PHAGS-PA LETTER A		ZANABAZAR SQUARE LETTER A		NEWA LETTER A		BHAIKSUKI LETTER A		SHARADA LETTER A	
Encodings	decimal	hex	dec	hex	dec	hex	dec	hex	dec	hex	dec	hex
Unicode	3944	U+0F68	43101	U+A85D	72192	U+11A00	70656	U+11400	72704	U+11C00	70019	U+11183
UTF-8	224 189 168	E0 BD A8	234 161 157	EA A1 9D	240 145 168 128	F0 91 A8 80	240 145 144 128	F0 91 90 80	240 145 176 128	F0 91 B0 80	240 145 134 131	F0 91 86 83
UTF-16	3944	0F68	43101	A85D	55302 56832	D806 DE00	55301 56320	D805 DC00	55303 56320	D807 DC00	55300 56707	D804 DD83
Numeric character reference	&#3944;	&#xF68;	&#43101;	&#xA85D;	&#72192;	&#x11A00;	&#70656;	&#x11400;	&#72704;	&#x11C00;	&#70019;	&#x11183;

Character information
Preview	အ		ᩋ		ᩬ		ᦀ		ᦁ	
Unicode name	MYANMAR LETTER A		TAI THAM LETTER A		TAI THAM VOWEL SIGN OA BELOW		NEW TAI LUE LETTER HIGH QA		NEW TAI LUE LETTER LOW QA	
Encodings	decimal	hex	dec	hex	dec	hex	dec	hex	dec	hex
Unicode	4129	U+1021	6731	U+1A4B	6764	U+1A6C	6528	U+1980	6529	U+1981
UTF-8	225 128 161	E1 80 A1	225 169 139	E1 A9 8B	225 169 172	E1 A9 AC	225 166 128	E1 A6 80	225 166 129	E1 A6 81
Numeric character reference	&#4129;	&#x1021;	&#6731;	&#x1A4B;	&#6764;	&#x1A6C;	&#6528;	&#x1980;	&#6529;	&#x1981;

- U+1A6C is widely misencoded as U+1A60+1A4B, which is intended for a distinctive but as yet unattested subscripting of the letter in the Khmer style.

Character information
Preview	អ		ອ		อ		ฮ		ꪮ		ꪯ	
Unicode name	KHMER LETTER QA		LAO LETTER O		THAI CHARACTER O ANG		THAI CHARACTER HO NOKHUK		TAI VIET LETTER LOW O		TAI VIET LETTER HIGH O	
Encodings	decimal	hex	dec	hex	dec	hex	dec	hex	dec	hex	dec	hex
Unicode	6050	U+17A2	3757	U+0EAD	3629	U+0E2D	3630	U+0E2E	43694	U+AAAE	43695	U+AAAF
UTF-8	225 158 162	E1 9E A2	224 186 173	E0 BA AD	224 184 173	E0 B8 AD	224 184 174	E0 B8 AE	234 170 174	EA AA AE	234 170 175	EA AA AF
Numeric character reference	&#6050;	&#x17A2;	&#3757;	&#xEAD;	&#3629;	&#xE2D;	&#3630;	&#xE2E;	&#43694;	&#xAAAE;	&#43695;	&#xAAAF;

Character information
Preview	අ		ꤢ		ᥣ		𑜒		𑤀		ꢂ		ꨀ	
Unicode name	SINHALA LETTER AYANNA		KAYAH LI LETTER A		TAI LE LETTER A		AHOM LETTER A		DIVES AKURU LETTER A		SAURASHTRA LETTER A		CHAM LETTER A	
Encodings	decimal	hex	dec	hex	dec	hex	dec	hex	dec	hex	dec	hex	dec	hex
Unicode	3461	U+0D85	43298	U+A922	6499	U+1963	71442	U+11712	71936	U+11900	43138	U+A882	43520	U+AA00
UTF-8	224 182 133	E0 B6 85	234 164 162	EA A4 A2	225 165 163	E1 A5 A3	240 145 156 146	F0 91 9C 92	240 145 164 128	F0 91 A4 80	234 162 130	EA A2 82	234 168 128	EA A8 80
UTF-16	3461	0D85	43298	A922	6499	1963	55301 57106	D805 DF12	55302 56576	D806 DD00	43138	A882	43520	AA00
Numeric character reference	&#3461;	&#xD85;	&#43298;	&#xA922;	&#6499;	&#x1963;	&#71442;	&#x11712;	&#71936;	&#x11900;	&#43138;	&#xA882;	&#43520;	&#xAA00;

Character information
Preview	𑘀		𑦠		ꠀ		𑵠			
Unicode name	MODI LETTER A		NANDINAGARI LETTER A		SYLOTI NAGRI LETTER A		GUNJALA GONDI LETTER A		KAITHI LETTER A	
Encodings	decimal	hex	dec	hex	dec	hex	dec	hex	dec	hex
Unicode	71168	U+11600	72096	U+119A0	43008	U+A800	73056	U+11D60	69763	U+11083
UTF-8	240 145 152 128	F0 91 98 80	240 145 166 160	F0 91 A6 A0	234 160 128	EA A0 80	240 145 181 160	F0 91 B5 A0	240 145 130 131	F0 91 82 83
UTF-16	55301 56832	D805 DE00	55302 56736	D806 DDA0	43008	A800	55303 56672	D807 DD60	55300 56451	D804 DC83
Numeric character reference	&#71168;	&#x11600;	&#72096;	&#x119A0;	&#43008;	&#xA800;	&#73056;	&#x11D60;	&#69763;	&#x11083;

Character information
Preview	𑒁		ᰣ		ꯑ		𑲏	
Unicode name	TIRHUTA LETTER A		LEPCHA LETTER A		MEETEI MAYEK LETTER ATIYA		MARCHEN LETTER A	
Encodings	decimal	hex	dec	hex	dec	hex	dec	hex
Unicode	70785	U+11481	7203	U+1C23	43985	U+ABD1	72847	U+11C8F
UTF-8	240 145 146 129	F0 91 92 81	225 176 163	E1 B0 A3	234 175 145	EA AF 91	240 145 178 143	F0 91 B2 8F
UTF-16	55301 56449	D805 DC81	7203	1C23	43985	ABD1	55303 56463	D807 DC8F
Numeric character reference	&#70785;	&#x11481;	&#7203;	&#x1C23;	&#43985;	&#xABD1;	&#72847;	&#x11C8F;

Character information
Preview	𑚀		𑠀		𑈀		𑊰		𑅐		𑊀	
Unicode name	TAKRI LETTER A		DOGRA LETTER A		KHOJKI LETTER A		KHUDAWADI LETTER A		MAHAJANI LETTER A		MULTANI LETTER A	
Encodings	decimal	hex	dec	hex	dec	hex	dec	hex	dec	hex	dec	hex
Unicode	71296	U+11680	71680	U+11800	70144	U+11200	70320	U+112B0	69968	U+11150	70272	U+11280
UTF-8	240 145 154 128	F0 91 9A 80	240 145 160 128	F0 91 A0 80	240 145 136 128	F0 91 88 80	240 145 138 176	F0 91 8A B0	240 145 133 144	F0 91 85 90	240 145 138 128	F0 91 8A 80
UTF-16	55301 56960	D805 DE80	55302 56320	D806 DC00	55300 56832	D804 DE00	55300 57008	D804 DEB0	55300 56656	D804 DD50	55300 56960	D804 DE80
Numeric character reference	&#71296;	&#x11680;	&#71680;	&#x11800;	&#70144;	&#x11200;	&#70320;	&#x112B0;	&#69968;	&#x11150;	&#70272;	&#x11280;

Character information
Preview	ᬅ		ᯀ		ᨕ		ꦄ		𑻱		ꥆ		ᮃ	
Unicode name	BALINESE LETTER AKARA		BATAK LETTER A		BUGINESE LETTER A		JAVANESE LETTER A		MAKASAR LETTER A		REJANG LETTER A		SUNDANESE LETTER A	
Encodings	decimal	hex	dec	hex	dec	hex	dec	hex	dec	hex	dec	hex	dec	hex
Unicode	6917	U+1B05	7104	U+1BC0	6677	U+1A15	43396	U+A984	73457	U+11EF1	43334	U+A946	7043	U+1B83
UTF-8	225 172 133	E1 AC 85	225 175 128	E1 AF 80	225 168 149	E1 A8 95	234 166 132	EA A6 84	240 145 187 177	F0 91 BB B1	234 165 134	EA A5 86	225 174 131	E1 AE 83
UTF-16	6917	1B05	7104	1BC0	6677	1A15	43396	A984	55303 57073	D807 DEF1	43334	A946	7043	1B83
Numeric character reference	&#6917;	&#x1B05;	&#7104;	&#x1BC0;	&#6677;	&#x1A15;	&#43396;	&#xA984;	&#73457;	&#x11EF1;	&#43334;	&#xA946;	&#7043;	&#x1B83;

Character information
Preview	ᜀ		ᝠ		ᝀ		ᜠ		𑴀	
Unicode name	TAGALOG LETTER A		TAGBANWA LETTER A		BUHID LETTER A		HANUNOO LETTER A		MASARAM GONDI LETTER A	
Encodings	decimal	hex	dec	hex	dec	hex	dec	hex	dec	hex
Unicode	5888	U+1700	5984	U+1760	5952	U+1740	5920	U+1720	72960	U+11D00
UTF-8	225 156 128	E1 9C 80	225 157 160	E1 9D A0	225 157 128	E1 9D 80	225 156 160	E1 9C A0	240 145 180 128	F0 91 B4 80
UTF-16	5888	1700	5984	1760	5952	1740	5920	1720	55303 56576	D807 DD00
Numeric character reference	&#5888;	&#x1700;	&#5984;	&#x1760;	&#5952;	&#x1740;	&#5920;	&#x1720;	&#72960;	&#x11D00;
