= Multani script =

Abugida

Multani 𑊠𑊂𑊣𑊖𑊀𑊚𑊁
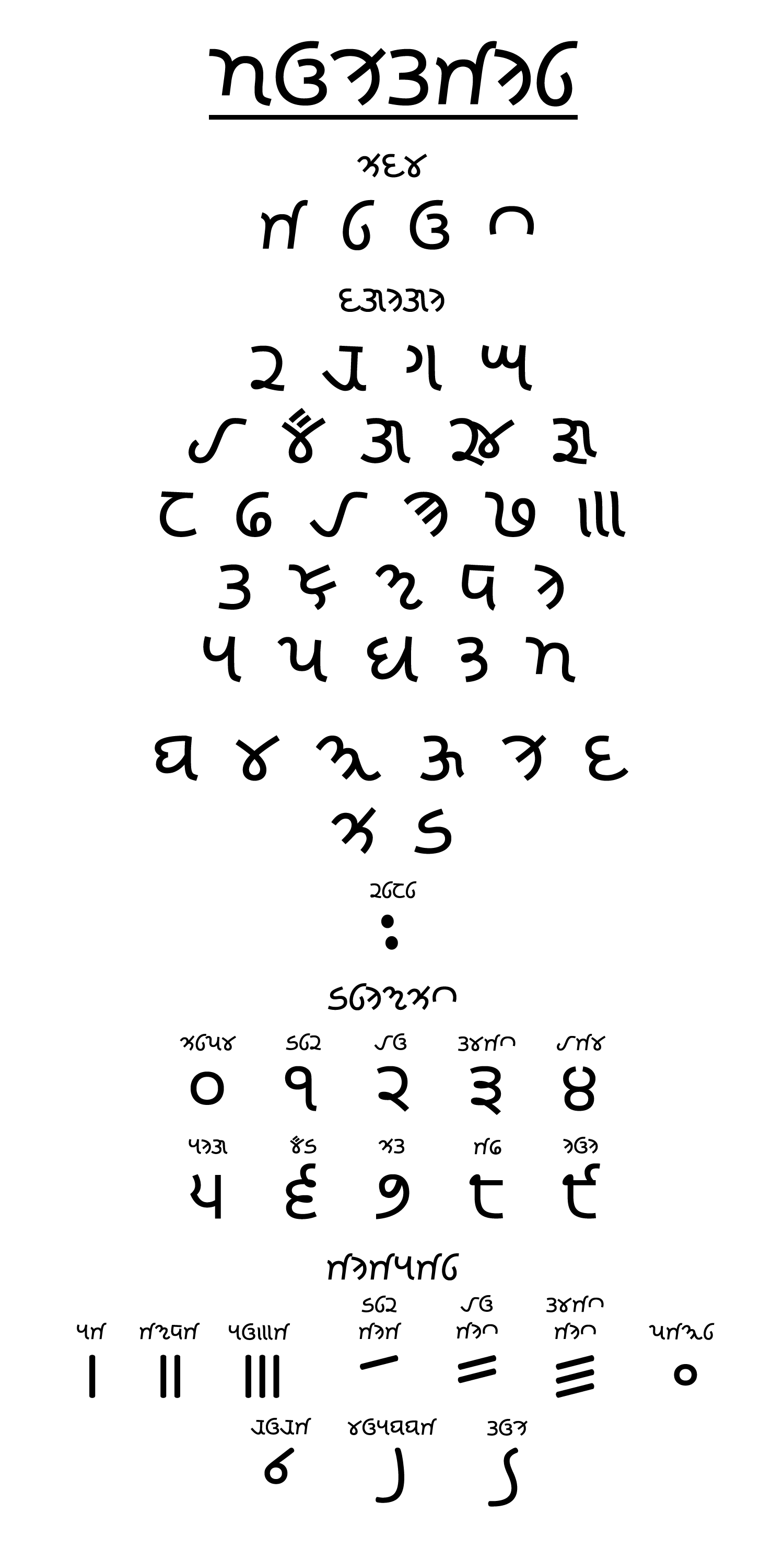
- The Multani alphabet chart divided into 4 vowels (𑊥𑊤𑊢), 33 consonants (𑊤𑊌𑊚𑊌𑊚), 1 punctuation mark, 10 numerals identical to Gurumukhi (𑊦𑊁𑊚𑊘𑊥𑊃) and the last two rows of Indic fraction signs
- Script type: Abugida
- Period: c. 18th–20th century CE
- Direction: Left-to-right

Related scripts
- Parent systems: Egyptian hieroglyphs: Proto-Sinaitic; Phoenician; Aramaic; Brāhmī; Gupta; Sharada; Landa; Multani
- Sister systems: Gurmukhi; Khudabadi; Khojki; Mahajani

ISO 15924
- ISO 15924: Mult (323), Multani

Unicode
- Unicode alias: Multani
- Unicode range: U+11280–U+112AF; Final Accepted Script Proposal

Multani (𑊠𑊂𑊣𑊖𑊀𑊚𑊁, romanized: Multānī), also known as Karikki and as Sarai, is an obsolete Northern Brahmic script. It is an abugida script and was mainly used for routine writing and commercial activities. It was one of four Landa scripts whose usage extended beyond the mercantile domain and was also formalized for literary activity and printing; the others being Gurmukhi, Khojki, and Khudabadi. It was historically used from the 18th to early 20th century.

== Background and origin ==
The script is of Brahmic origin. The script is part of the Laṇḍā scripts, which derive from the Sharada script. It shares similarities with other Landa scripts such as Khojki and Khudawadi.

== Usage ==
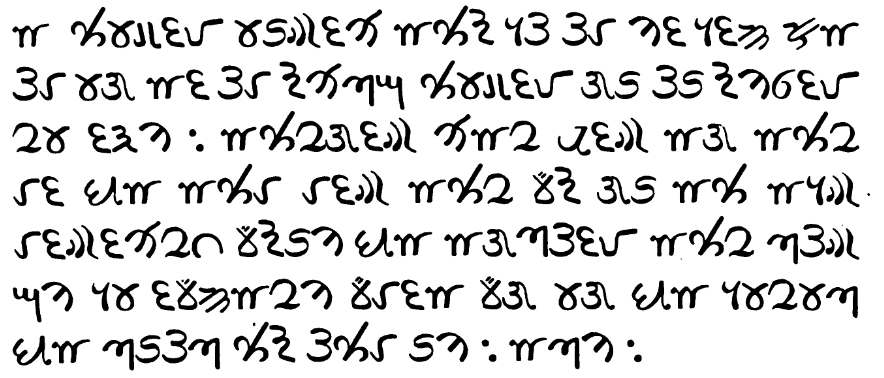
An excerpt of printed Multani, 1880.

The script was used for routine writing and commercial activities. In the early 19th century it was adapted for literary usage when the Baptist Missionary Press produced metal fonts for the script in order to print Christian literature. The first book printed in the Multani script was the New Testament (1819). In the latter half of the 19th century, the British administration introduced the Arabic script as the standard for the languages of Sindh, which led to the demise of the Landa scripts of the region. The Multani script is no longer used and Punjabi is now written using Shahmukhi in Pakistan and Gurmukhi in India.

== Characters ==
The word 'Multani' in modern Multani typeface. The word is rendered without any dependent vowels as they are not yet part of the Unicode chart for Multani.

Two different styles are observed over the course of the 19th century, with the later style representing a simplified version of the original style. Some consonants begin to represent their aspirated and implosive forms. The script also functions more as an abjad than as an abugida, as vowels are not marked unless the word is monosyllabic and as there are no dependent vowel signs, only independent ones that can appear at the beginning of a word, as with other Indic scripts. There is no virama, and consonant clusters are written with independent consonants. There is one section mark punctuation that has been identified. The independent vowels, of which there are only four, represent both short and long forms of the independent vowels in addition to phonological variations, and 'i' sometimes represents 'ya'. Ultimately, many consonants represent multiple sounds, and the digits largely represent those found in Gurmukhi, with the exception of 6 and 7, which resemble Devanagari more closely.

Vowels
𑊀 a	𑊁 i	𑊂 u	𑊃 e

Consonants
𑊄 ka	𑊅 kha	𑊆 ga		𑊈 gha	
𑊊 ca	𑊋 cha	𑊌 ja	𑊍 jja		𑊏 nya
𑊐 tta	𑊑 ttha	𑊒 dda	𑊓 ddda	𑊔 ddha	𑊕 nna
𑊖 ta	𑊗 tha	𑊘 da		𑊙 dha	𑊚 na
𑊛 pa	𑊜 pha	𑊝 ba		𑊟 bha	𑊠 ma
𑊡 ya	𑊢 ra	𑊣 la	𑊤 va	𑊥 sa	𑊦 ha
𑊧 rra	𑊨 rha				

Punctuation
𑊩
section mark

== Unicode ==
Multani script was added to the Unicode Standard in June, 2015 with the release of version 8.0.

The Unicode block for Multani is U+11280–U+112AF:

Multani^{[1]}^{[2]} Official Unicode Consortium code chart (PDF)
	0	1	2	3	4	5	6	7	8	9	A	B	C	D	E	F
U+1128x	𑊀	𑊁	𑊂	𑊃	𑊄	𑊅	𑊆		𑊈		𑊊	𑊋	𑊌	𑊍		𑊏
U+1129x	𑊐	𑊑	𑊒	𑊓	𑊔	𑊕	𑊖	𑊗	𑊘	𑊙	𑊚	𑊛	𑊜	𑊝		𑊟
U+112Ax	𑊠	𑊡	𑊢	𑊣	𑊤	𑊥	𑊦	𑊧	𑊨	𑊩						
Notes 1.As of Unicode version 18.0 2.Grey areas indicate non-assigned code points
