= Ña =

Letter in Indic scripts

Example glyphs
- Bengali–Assamese: Ña
- Tibetan: Ña
- Tamil: Ña
- Thai: ญ
- Malayalam: ഞ
- Sinhala: ඤ
- Ashoka Brahmi: Ña
- Devanagari: Ña

Properties
- Phonemic representation: /ɲ/
- IAST transliteration: ña Ña
- ISCII code point: BC (188)

Ña or Nya is the tenth consonant of Indic abugidas. It is derived from the early "Ashoka" Brahmi letter.

== Historic Ña ==
There are three different general early historic scripts - Brahmi and its variants, Kharoṣṭhī, and Tocharian, the so-called slanting Brahmi. Ña as found in standard Brahmi, was a simple geometric shape, with variations toward more flowing forms by the Gupta. The Tocharian Ña did not have an alternate Fremdzeichen form. The third form of ña, in Kharoshthi was probably derived from Aramaic separately from the Brahmi letter.

=== Brahmi Ña ===
The Brahmi letter, Ña, is probably derived from the altered Aramaic Nun, and is thus related to the modern Latin N and Greek Nu. Several identifiable styles of writing the Brahmi Ña can be found, most associated with a specific set of inscriptions from an artifact or diverse records from an historic period. As the earliest and most geometric style of Brahmi, the letters found on the Edicts of Ashoka and other records from around that time are normally the reference form for Brahmi letters, with vowel marks not attested until later forms of Brahmi back-formed to match the geometric writing style.

Brahmi Ña historic forms
| Ashoka (3rd-1st c. BCE) | Girnar (~150 BCE) | Kushana (~150-250 CE) | Gujarat (~250 CE) | Gupta (~350 CE) |

=== Tocharian Ña ===
The Tocharian letter is derived from the Brahmi, but does not have an alternate Fremdzeichen form.

Tocharian Ña with vowel marks
| Ña | Ñā | Ñi | Ñī | Ñu | Ñū | Ñr | Ñr̄ | Ñe | Ñai | Ño | Ñau | Ñä |

=== Kharoṣṭhī Ña ===
The Kharoṣṭhī letter is generally accepted as being derived from the altered Aramaic Nun, and is thus related to N and Nu, in addition to the Brahmi Ña.

== Devanagari script ==
Ña (ञ, Sanskrit and Hindi: ञकार ñakāra) is the tenth consonant of the Devanagari abugida. It ultimately arose from the Brahmi letter, after having gone through the Gupta letter. Letters that derive from it are the Gujarati letter ઞ, and the Modi letter 𑘗.

=== Devanagari-using Languages ===
In all languages, ञ is pronounced as [ɲə] or [ɲ] when appropriate, similar to the phoneme in English canyon (/ˈkænjən/).. Like all Indic scripts, Devanagari uses vowel marks attached to the base consonant to override the inherent /ə/ vowel:

Devanagari ञ with vowel marks
| Ña | Ñā | Ñi | Ñī | Ñu | Ñū | Ñr̥ | Ñr̥̄ | Ñl̥ | Ñl̥̄ | Ñe | Ñai | Ño | Ñau | Ñ |
|---|---|---|---|---|---|---|---|---|---|---|---|---|---|---|
| ञ | ञा | ञि | ञी | ञु | ञू | ञृ | ञॄ | ञॢ | ञॣ | ञे | ञै | ञो | ञौ | ञ् |

=== Conjuncts with ञ ===
Half form of Ña.

Devanagari exhibits conjunct ligatures, as is common in Indic scripts. In modern Devanagari texts, most conjuncts are formed by reducing the letter shape to fit tightly to the following letter, usually by dropping a character's vertical stem, sometimes referred to as a "half form". Some conjunct clusters are always represented by a true ligature, instead of a shape that can be broken into constituent independent letters. Vertically stacked conjuncts are ubiquitous in older texts, while only a few are still used routinely in modern Devanagari texts. The use of ligatures and vertical conjuncts may vary across languages using the Devanagari script, with Marathi in particular preferring the use of half forms where texts in other languages would show ligatures and vertical stacks.

==== Ligature conjuncts of ञ ====
True ligatures are quite rare in Indic scripts. The most common ligated conjuncts in Devanagari are in the form of a slight mutation to fit in context or as a consistent variant form appended to the adjacent characters. Those variants include Na and the Repha and Rakar forms of Ra. Nepali and Marathi texts use the "eyelash" Ra half form for an initial "R" instead of repha.

- Repha र্ (r) + ञ (ña) gives the ligature rña: ^{note}

- Eyelash र্ (r) + ञ (ña) gives the ligature rña:

- ञ্ (ñ) + rakar र (ra) gives the ligature ñra:

- ञ্ (ñ) + न (na) gives the ligature ñna:

==== Devanagari Jña ====
Jña half form

One of the most common true ligatures in Devanagari is the conjunct jña ज्ञ. This ligature is a required form for most Devanagari languages, and the conjunct even has its own half form that freely joins other letters in horizontal conjuncts.

- ज্ (j) + ञ (ña) gives the ligature jña:

- Repha र্ (r) + ज্ (j) + ञ (ña) gives the ligature rjña:

- Eyelash र্ (r) + ज্ (j) + ञ (ña) gives the ligature rjña:

- भ্ (bʰ) + ज্ (j) + ञ (ña) gives the ligature bʰjña:

- ब্ (b) + ज্ (j) + ञ (ña) gives the ligature bjña:

- छ্ (cʰ) + ज্ (j) + ञ (ña) gives the ligature cʰjña:

- च্ (c) + ज্ (j) + ञ (ña) gives the ligature cjña:

- ढ্ (ḍʱ) + ज্ (j) + ञ (ña) gives the ligature ḍʱjña:

- ड্ (ḍ) + ज্ (j) + ञ (ña) gives the ligature ḍjña:

- द্ (d) + ज্ (j) + ञ (ña) gives the ligature djña:

- घ্ (ɡʱ) + ज্ (j) + ञ (ña) gives the ligature ɡʱjña:

- ग্ (g) + ज্ (j) + ञ (ña) gives the ligature gjña:

- ह্ (h) + ज্ (j) + ञ (ña) gives the ligature hjña:

- ज্ (j) + ज্ (j) + ञ (ña) gives the ligature jjña:

- झ্ (jʰ) + ज্ (j) + ञ (ña) gives the ligature jʰjña:

- ख্ (kʰ) + ज্ (j) + ञ (ña) gives the ligature kʰjña:

- क্ (k) + ज্ (j) + ञ (ña) gives the ligature kjña:

- ल্ (l) + ज্ (j) + ञ (ña) gives the ligature ljña:

- म্ (m) + ज্ (j) + ञ (ña) gives the ligature mjña:

- न্ (n) + ज্ (j) + ञ (ña) gives the ligature njña:

- ञ্ (ñ) + ज্ (j) + ञ (ña) gives the ligature ñjña:

- ङ্ (ŋ) + ज্ (j) + ञ (ña) gives the ligature ŋjña:

- फ্ (pʰ) + ज্ (j) + ञ (ña) gives the ligature pʰjña:

- प্ (p) + ज্ (j) + ञ (ña) gives the ligature pjña:

- श্ (ʃ) + ज্ (j) + ञ (ña) gives the ligature ʃjña:

- स্ (s) + ज্ (j) + ञ (ña) gives the ligature sjña:

- ष্ (ṣ) + ज্ (j) + ञ (ña) gives the ligature ṣjña:

- थ্ (tʰ) + ज্ (j) + ञ (ña) gives the ligature tʰjña:

- त্ (t) + ज্ (j) + ञ (ña) gives the ligature tjña:

- ठ্ (ṭʰ) + ज্ (j) + ञ (ña) gives the ligature ṭʰjña:

- ट্ (ṭ) + ज্ (j) + ञ (ña) gives the ligature ṭjña:

- व্ (v) + ज্ (j) + ञ (ña) gives the ligature vjña:

- य্ (y) + ज্ (j) + ञ (ña) gives the ligature yjña:

==== Stacked conjuncts of ञ ====
Vertically stacked ligatures are the most common conjunct forms found in Devanagari text. Although the constituent characters may need to be stretched and moved slightly in order to stack neatly, stacked conjuncts can be broken down into recognizable base letters, or a letter and an otherwise standard ligature.

- भ্ (bʰ) + ञ (ña) gives the ligature bʰña:

- ब্ (b) + ञ (ña) gives the ligature bña:

- छ্ (cʰ) + ञ (ña) gives the ligature cʰña:

- च্ (c) + ञ (ña) gives the ligature cña:

- ढ্ (ḍʱ) + ञ (ña) gives the ligature ḍʱña:

- ड্ (ḍ) + ञ (ña) gives the ligature ḍña:

- ध্ (dʱ) + ज্ (j) + ञ (ña) gives the ligature dʱjña:

- ध্ (dʱ) + ञ (ña) gives the ligature dʱña:

- द্ (d) + ञ (ña) gives the ligature dña:

- घ্ (ɡʱ) + ञ (ña) gives the ligature ɡʱña:

- ह্ (h) + ञ (ña) gives the ligature hña:

- झ্ (jʰ) + ञ (ña) gives the ligature jʰña:

- ख্ (kʰ) + ञ (ña) gives the ligature kʰña:

- क্ (k) + ञ (ña) gives the ligature kña:

- ळ্ (ḷ) + ञ (ña) gives the ligature ḷña:

- ल্ (l) + ञ (ña) gives the ligature lña:

- म্ (m) + ञ (ña) gives the ligature mña:

- ङ্ (ŋ) + ञ (ña) gives the ligature ŋña:

- न্ (n) + ञ (ña) gives the ligature nña:

- ञ্ (ñ) + ब (ba) gives the ligature ñba:

- ञ্ (ñ) + च (ca) gives the ligature ñca:

- ञ্ (ñ) + ज (ja) gives the ligature ñja:

- ञ্ (ñ) + ल (la) gives the ligature ñla:

- ञ্ (ñ) + ञ (ña) gives the ligature ñña:

- ञ্ (ñ) + व (va) gives the ligature ñva:

- फ্ (pʰ) + ञ (ña) gives the ligature pʰña:

- प্ (p) + ञ (ña) gives the ligature pña:

- श্ (ʃ) + ञ (ña) gives the ligature ʃña:

- स্ (s) + ञ (ña) gives the ligature sña:

- ष্ (ṣ) + ञ (ña) gives the ligature ṣña:

- थ্ (tʰ) + ञ (ña) gives the ligature tʰña:

- त্ (t) + ञ (ña) gives the ligature tña:

- ठ্ (ṭʰ) + ञ (ña) gives the ligature ṭʰña:

- ट্ (ṭ) + ञ (ña) gives the ligature ṭña:

- व্ (v) + ञ (ña) gives the ligature vña:

- य্ (y) + ञ (ña) gives the ligature yña:

== Bengali script ==
The Bengali script ঞ is derived from the Siddhaṃ, and is marked by no horizontal head line, and a less geometric shape than its Devanagari counterpart, ञ. The inherent vowel of Bengali consonant letters is /ɔ/, so the bare letter ঞ will sometimes be transliterated as "ño" instead of "ña". Adding a "okar" (ও-কার), the "o" vowel mark, gives a reading of /ɲo/. Like all Indic consonants, ঞ can be modified by marks to indicate another (or no) vowel than its inherent "a".

Bengali ঞ with vowel marks
| ña | ñā | ñi | ñī | ñu | ñū | ñr | ñr̄ | ñe | ñai | ño | ñau | ñ |
|---|---|---|---|---|---|---|---|---|---|---|---|---|
| ঞ | ঞা | ঞি | ঞী | ঞু | ঞূ | ঞৃ | ঞৄ | ঞে | ঞৈ | ঞো | ঞৌ | ঞ্ |

=== ঞ in Bengali-using languages ===
ঞ is used as a basic consonant character in all of the major Bengali script orthographies, including Bengali and Assamese.

=== Conjuncts with ঞ ===
Bengali ঞ exhibits conjunct ligatures, as is common in Indic scripts, with a mix of both stacked and linear ligatures.

- চ্ (c) + ঞ (ña) gives the ligature cña:

- জ্ (j) + ঞ (ña) gives the ligature jña:

- ঞ্ (ñ) + চ (ca) gives the ligature ñca:

- ঞ্ (ñ) + ছ (cʰa) gives the ligature ñcʰa:

- ঞ্ (ñ) + জ (ja) gives the ligature ñja:

- ঞ্ (ñ) + ঝ (jʰa) gives the ligature ñjʰa:

- ষ্ (ṣ) + ঞ (ña) gives the ligature ṣña:

== Gurmukhi Ña ==
Ñaññā (ਞ, Punjabi: ਞੱਞਾ ñaññā) is a consonant of Gurmukhi. It is represented in Shahmukhi with Punjabi: ں nun gunnah or Punjabi: ن nun.

== Gujarati Ña ==
Ña (ઞ) is a consonant of the Gujarati abugida. It is derived from the Devanagari Ña, and ultimately the Brahmi letter.

Gujarati Ña.

Ña (ઞ) is a consonant of the Gujarati abugida. It is derived from the Devanagari Ña with the top bar (shiro rekha) removed, and ultimately the Brahmi letter.

=== Gujarati-using Languages ===
The Gujarati script is used to write the Gujarati and Kutchi languages. In both languages, ઞ is pronounced as [ɲə] or [ɲ] when appropriate. Like all Indic scripts, Gujarati uses vowel marks attached to the base consonant to override the inherent /ə/ vowel:

| Ña | Ñā | Ñi | Ñī | Ñu | Ñū | Ñr | Ñl | Ñr̄ | Ñl̄ | Ñĕ | Ñe | Ñai | Ñŏ | Ño | Ñau | Ñ |
|---|---|---|---|---|---|---|---|---|---|---|---|---|---|---|---|---|
Gujarati Ña syllables, with vowel marks in red.

=== Conjuncts with ઞ ===
Half form of Ña.

Gujarati ઞ exhibits conjunct ligatures, much like its parent Devanagari Script. Most Gujarati conjuncts can only be formed by reducing the letter shape to fit tightly to the following letter, usually by dropping a character's vertical stem, sometimes referred to as a "half form". A few conjunct clusters can be represented by a true ligature, instead of a shape that can be broken into constituent independent letters, and vertically stacked conjuncts can also be found in Gujarati, although much less commonly than in Devanagari. True ligatures are quite rare in Indic scripts. The most common ligated conjuncts in Gujarati are in the form of a slight mutation to fit in context or as a consistent variant form appended to the adjacent characters. Those variants include Na and the Repha and Rakar forms of Ra.

- ર્ (r) + ઞ (ɲa) gives the ligature RÑa:

- ઞ્ (ɲ) + ર (ra) gives the ligature ÑRa:

- જ્ (j) + ઞ (ɲa) gives the ligature JÑa:

- ર્ (r) + જ (ja) ઞ (ɲa) gives the ligature RJÑa:

- જ (ja) + ઞ્ (ɲ) + ર (ra) gives the ligature JÑRa:

- ઞ્ (ɲ) + ન (na) gives the ligature ÑNa:

== Telugu Ña ==
Telugu independent and subjoined Ña.

Ña (ఞ) is a consonant of the Telugu abugida. It ultimately arose from the Brahmi letter. It is closely related to the Kannada letter ಞ. Since it lacks the v-shaped headstroke common to most Telugu letters, ఞ remains unaltered by most vowel matras, and its subjoined form is simply a smaller version of the normal letter shape. Telugu conjuncts are created by reducing trailing letters to a subjoined form that appears below the initial consonant of the conjunct. Many subjoined forms are created by dropping their headline, with many extending the end of the stroke of the main letter body to form an extended tail reaching up to the right of the preceding consonant. This subjoining of trailing letters to create conjuncts is in contrast to the leading half forms of Devanagari and Bengali letters. Ligature conjuncts are not a feature in Telugu, with the only non-standard construction being an alternate subjoined form of Ṣa (borrowed from Kannada) in the KṢa conjunct.

== Malayalam Ña ==
Malayalam letter Ña

Ña (ഞ) is a consonant of the Malayalam abugida. It ultimately arose from the Brahmi letter, via the Grantha letter Ña. Like in other Indic scripts, Malayalam consonants have the inherent vowel "a", and take one of several modifying vowel signs to represent syllables with another vowel or no vowel at all.

Malayalam Ña matras: Ña, Ñā, Ñi, Ñī, Ñu, Ñū, Ñr̥, Ñr̥̄, Ñl̥, Ñl̥̄, Ñe, Ñē, Ñai, Ño, Ñō, Ñau, and Ñ.

=== Conjuncts of ഞ ===
As is common in Indic scripts, Malayalam joins letters together to form conjunct consonant clusters. There are several ways in which conjuncts are formed in Malayalam texts: using a post-base form of a trailing consonant placed under the initial consonant of a conjunct, a combined ligature of two or more consonants joined together, a conjoining form that appears as a combining mark on the rest of the conjunct, the use of an explicit candrakkala mark to suppress the inherent "a" vowel, or a special consonant form called a "chillu" letter, representing a bare consonant without the inherent "a" vowel. Texts written with the modern reformed Malayalam orthography, put̪iya lipi, may favor more regular conjunct forms than older texts in paḻaya lipi, due to changes undertaken in the 1970s by the Government of Kerala.

- ഞ് (ñ) + ച (ca) gives the ligature ñca:

- ഞ് (ñ) + ജ (ja) gives the ligature ñja:

- ജ് (j) + ഞ (ña) gives the ligature jña:

- ഞ് (ñ) + ഞ (ña) gives the ligature ñña:

== Thai script ==
Yo Ying (ญ, Thai: ญอ หญิง) is the thirteenth letter of the Thai script. It falls under the low class of Thai consonants. In IPA, yo ying is pronounced as [j] at the beginning of the syllable and [n] at the end of syllable and in Old Thai, it was pronounced as [ɲ], Thai consonants do not form conjunct ligatures, and use the pinthu—an explicit virama with a dot shape—to indicate bare consonants. In the acrophony of the Thai script, ying (หญิง) means ‘woman’. Yo Ying corresponds to the Sanskrit character ‘ञ’.

== Odia Ña ==
Odia independent letter Ña

Ña (ଞ) is a consonant of the Odia abugida. It ultimately arose from the Brahmi letter, via the Siddhaṃ letter Ña. Like in other Indic scripts, Odia consonants have the inherent vowel "a", and take one of several modifying vowel signs to represent syllables with another vowel or no vowel at all.

Odia Ña with vowel matras
| Ña | Ñā | Ñi | Ñī | Ñu | Ñū | Ñr̥ | Ñr̥̄ | Ñl̥ | Ñl̥̄ | Ñe | Ñai | Ño | Ñau | Ñ |
|---|---|---|---|---|---|---|---|---|---|---|---|---|---|---|
| ଞ | ଞା | ଞି | ଞୀ | ଞୁ | ଞୂ | ଞୃ | ଞୄ | ଞୢ | ଞୣ | ଞେ | ଞୈ | ଞୋ | ଞୌ | ଞ୍ |

=== Conjuncts of ଞ ===
As is common in Indic scripts, Odia joins letters together to form conjunct consonant clusters. ଞ does not have the small subjoined form that is the most common means of conjunct formation in Odia. The second type of conjunct formation is through pure ligatures, where the constituent consonants are written together in a single graphic form. This ligature may be recognizable as being a combination of two characters or it can have a conjunct ligature unrelated to its constituent characters. For other conjuncts, an explicit Halanta is needed when adding ଞ.

- ଞ୍ (ñ) + ଚ (ca) gives the ligature ñca:

- ଞ୍ (ñ) + ଛ (cʰa) gives the ligature ñcʰa:

- ଞ୍ (ñ) + ଜ (ja) gives the ligature ñja:

- ଞ୍ (ñ) + ଝ (jʰa) gives the ligature ñjʰa:

- ଜ୍ (j) + ଞ (ña) gives the ligature jña:

== Kaithi Ña ==
Kaithi consonant and half-form Ña.

Ña (𑂖) is a consonant of the Kaithi abugida. It ultimately arose from the Brahmi letter, via the Siddhaṃ letter Ña. Like in other Indic scripts, Kaithi consonants have the inherent vowel "a", and take one of several modifying vowel signs to represent syllables with another vowel or no vowel at all.

Kaithi Ña with vowel matras
| Ña | Ñā | Ñi | Ñī | Ñu | Ñū | Ñe | Ñai | Ño | Ñau | Ñ |
|---|---|---|---|---|---|---|---|---|---|---|
| 𑂖 | 𑂖𑂰 | 𑂖𑂱 | 𑂖𑂲 | 𑂖𑂳 | 𑂖𑂴 | 𑂖𑂵 | 𑂖𑂶 | 𑂖𑂷 | 𑂖𑂸 | 𑂖𑂹 |

=== Conjuncts of 𑂖 ===
As is common in Indic scripts, Kaithi joins letters together to form conjunct consonant clusters. The most common conjunct formation is achieved by using a half form of preceding consonants, although several consonants use an explicit virama. Most half forms are derived from the full form by removing the vertical stem. As is common in most Indic scripts, conjuncts of ra are indicated with a repha or rakar mark attached to the rest of the consonant cluster. In addition, there are a few vertical conjuncts that can be found in Kaithi writing, but true ligatures are not used in the modern Kaithi script.

- 𑂩୍ (r) + 𑂖 (ña) gives the ligature rña:

== Tirhuta Ña ==
Tirhuta consonant Ña

Ña (𑒘) is a consonant of the Tirhuta abugida. It ultimately arose from the Brahmi letter, via the Siddhaṃ letter Nya. Like in other Indic scripts, Tirhuta consonants have the inherent vowel "a", and take one of several modifying vowel signs to represent sylables with another vowel or no vowel at all.

Tirhuta Ña with vowel matras
| Ña | Ñā | Ñi | Ñī | Ñu | Ñū | Ñṛ | Ñṝ | Ñḷ | Ñḹ | Ñē | Ñe | Ñai | Ñō | Ño | Ñau | Ñ |
|---|---|---|---|---|---|---|---|---|---|---|---|---|---|---|---|---|
| 𑒘 | 𑒘𑒰 | 𑒘𑒱 | 𑒘𑒲 | 𑒘𑒳 | 𑒘𑒴 | 𑒘𑒵 | 𑒘𑒶 | 𑒘𑒷 | 𑒘𑒸 | 𑒘𑒹 | 𑒘𑒺 | 𑒘𑒻 | 𑒘𑒼 | 𑒘𑒽 | 𑒘𑒾 | 𑒘𑓂 |

=== Conjuncts of 𑒘 ===
As is common in Indic scripts, Tirhuta joins letters together to form conjunct consonant clusters. The most common conjunct formation is achieved by using an explicit virama. As is common in most Indic scripts, conjuncts of ra are indicated with a repha or rakar mark attached to the rest of the consonant cluster. In addition, other consonants take unique combining forms when in conjunct with other letters, and there are several vertical conjuncts and true ligatures that can be found in Tirhuta writing.

- 𑒖୍ (j) + 𑒘 (ña) gives the ligature jña:

- 𑒘୍ (ñ) + 𑒔 (ca) gives the ligature ñca:

- 𑒘୍ (ñ) + 𑒕 (cʰa) gives the ligature ñcʰa:

- 𑒘୍ (ñ) + 𑒩 (ra) gives the ligature ñra:

- 𑒘୍ (ñ) + 𑒫 (va) gives the ligature ñva:

- 𑒩୍ (r) + 𑒖୍ (j) + 𑒘 (ña) gives the ligature rjña:

- 𑒩୍ (r) + 𑒘 (ña) gives the ligature rña:

- 𑒞୍ (t) + 𑒖୍ (j) + 𑒘 (ña) gives the ligature tjña:

- 𑒞୍ (t) + 𑒘 (ña) gives the ligature tña:

== Comparison of Ña ==
The various Indic scripts are generally related to each other through adaptation and borrowing, and as such the glyphs for cognate letters, including Ña, are related as well.

Comparison of Ña in different scripts

Aramaic
Kharoṣṭhī - | Ashoka Brahmi | Kushana Brahmi (Note: The middle "Kushana" form of Brahmi is a later style that emerged as Brahmi scripts were beginning to proliferate. Gupta Brahmi was definitely a stylistic descendant from Kushana, but other Brahmi-derived scripts may have descended from earlier forms.) | Tocharian (Note: Tocharian is probably derived from the middle period "Kushana" form of Brahmi, although artifacts from that time are not plentiful enough to establish a definite succession.)
Gupta Brahmi | Pallava
Kadamba -
Bhaiksuki 𑰗 | Siddhaṃ | Grantha - | Cham -
Sinhala ඤ | Pyu / Old Mon (Note: Pyu and Old Mon are probably the precursors of the Burmese script, and may be derived from either the Pallava or Kadamba script) -
Tibetan | Newa 𑐘 | Ahom 𑜐 | Malayalam ഞ
Telugu ఞ | Burmese ဉ / ည
Lepcha - | Ranjana | Saurashtra - | Dives Akuru 𑤕
Kannada ಞ | Kayah Li -
Limbu - | Soyombo (Note: May also be derived from Devangari (see bottom left of table)) 𑩥 | Khmer ញ | Tamil
Chakma 𑄐 | Tai Tham ᨬ
Meitei Mayek - | Gaudi - | Thai ญ | Lao ຎ
Tai Le -
Marchen 𑱹 | Tirhuta - | New Tai Lue - | Tai Viet - | Aksara Kawi
'Phags-pa - | Odia ଞ | Sharada - | Rejang ꤻ | Batak ᯠ | Buginese ᨎ
Zanabazar Square 𑨓 | Bengali–Assamese | Takri - | Javanese ꦚ | Balinese ᬜ | Makasar 𑻫
Hangul (Note: The Origin of Hangul from 'Phags-pa is one of limited influence, inspiring at most a few basic letter shapes. Hangul does not function as an Indic abugida.) - | Northern Nagari - | Dogri 𑠓 | Laṇḍā - | Sundanese ᮑ | Baybayin -
Modi - | Gujarati ઞ | Khojki - | Khudabadi - | Mahajani - | Tagbanwa -
Devanagari | Nandinagari 𑦷 | Kaithi | Gurmukhi ਞ | Multani 𑊏 | Buhid -
Canadian Syllabics (Note: Although the basic letter forms of the Canadian Aboriginal Syllabics were derived from handwritten Devanagari letters, this abugida indicates vowel sounds by rotations of the letter form, rather than the use of vowel diacritics as is standard in Indic abugidas.) - | Soyombo (Note: May also be derived from Ranjana (see above)) 𑩥 | Sylheti Nagari - | Gunjala Gondi - | Masaram Gondi (Note: Masaram Gondi acts as an Indic abugida, but its letterforms were not derived from any single precursor script.) 𑴕 | Hanuno'o -

== Character encodings of Ña ==
Most Indic scripts are encoded in the Unicode Standard, and as such the letter Ña in those scripts can be represented in plain text with unique codepoint. Ña from several modern-use scripts can also be found in legacy encodings, such as ISCII.

Character information
| Preview | | | | | | | ఞ | | ଞ | | ಞ | | ഞ | | ઞ | | ਞ | |
|---|---|---|---|---|---|---|---|---|---|---|---|---|---|---|---|---|---|---|
| Unicode name | DEVANAGARI LETTER NYA | | BENGALI LETTER NYA | | TAMIL LETTER NYA | | TELUGU LETTER NYA | | ORIYA LETTER NYA | | KANNADA LETTER NYA | | MALAYALAM LETTER NYA | | GUJARATI LETTER NYA | | GURMUKHI LETTER NYA | |
| Encodings | decimal | hex | dec | hex | dec | hex | dec | hex | dec | hex | dec | hex | dec | hex | dec | hex | dec | hex |
| Unicode | 2334 | U+091E | 2462 | U+099E | 2974 | U+0B9E | 3102 | U+0C1E | 2846 | U+0B1E | 3230 | U+0C9E | 3358 | U+0D1E | 2718 | U+0A9E | 2590 | U+0A1E |
| UTF-8 | 224 164 158 | E0 A4 9E | 224 166 158 | E0 A6 9E | 224 174 158 | E0 AE 9E | 224 176 158 | E0 B0 9E | 224 172 158 | E0 AC 9E | 224 178 158 | E0 B2 9E | 224 180 158 | E0 B4 9E | 224 170 158 | E0 AA 9E | 224 168 158 | E0 A8 9E |
| Numeric character reference | &#2334; | &#x91E; | &#2462; | &#x99E; | &#2974; | &#xB9E; | &#3102; | &#xC1E; | &#2846; | &#xB1E; | &#3230; | &#xC9E; | &#3358; | &#xD1E; | &#2718; | &#xA9E; | &#2590; | &#xA1E; |
| ISCII | 188 | BC | 188 | BC | 188 | BC | 188 | BC | 188 | BC | 188 | BC | 188 | BC | 188 | BC | 188 | BC |

Character information
| Preview | Ashoka Kushana Gupta | | | |
|---|---|---|---|---|
| Unicode name | BRAHMI LETTER NYA | | SIDDHAM LETTER NYA | |
| Encodings | decimal | hex | dec | hex |
| Unicode | 69660 | U+1101C | 71063 | U+11597 |
| UTF-8 | 240 145 128 156 | F0 91 80 9C | 240 145 150 151 | F0 91 96 97 |
| UTF-16 | 55300 56348 | D804 DC1C | 55301 56727 | D805 DD97 |
| Numeric character reference | &#69660; | &#x1101C; | &#71063; | &#x11597; |

Character information
| Preview | | | ྙ | | 𑨓 | | 𑐘 | | 𑰗 | |
|---|---|---|---|---|---|---|---|---|---|---|
| Unicode name | TIBETAN LETTER NYA | | TIBETAN SUBJOINED LETTER NYA | | ZANABAZAR SQUARE LETTER NYA | | NEWA LETTER NYA | | BHAIKSUKI LETTER NYA | |
| Encodings | decimal | hex | dec | hex | dec | hex | dec | hex | dec | hex |
| Unicode | 3913 | U+0F49 | 3993 | U+0F99 | 72211 | U+11A13 | 70680 | U+11418 | 72727 | U+11C17 |
| UTF-8 | 224 189 137 | E0 BD 89 | 224 190 153 | E0 BE 99 | 240 145 168 147 | F0 91 A8 93 | 240 145 144 152 | F0 91 90 98 | 240 145 176 151 | F0 91 B0 97 |
| UTF-16 | 3913 | 0F49 | 3993 | 0F99 | 55302 56851 | D806 DE13 | 55301 56344 | D805 DC18 | 55303 56343 | D807 DC17 |
| Numeric character reference | &#3913; | &#xF49; | &#3993; | &#xF99; | &#72211; | &#x11A13; | &#70680; | &#x11418; | &#72727; | &#x11C17; |

Character information
| Preview | ဉ | | ည | | ᨬ | |
|---|---|---|---|---|---|---|
| Unicode name | MYANMAR LETTER NYA | | MYANMAR LETTER NNYA | | TAI THAM LETTER NYA | |
| Encodings | decimal | hex | dec | hex | dec | hex |
| Unicode | 4105 | U+1009 | 4106 | U+100A | 6700 | U+1A2C |
| UTF-8 | 225 128 137 | E1 80 89 | 225 128 138 | E1 80 8A | 225 168 172 | E1 A8 AC |
| Numeric character reference | &#4105; | &#x1009; | &#4106; | &#x100A; | &#6700; | &#x1A2C; |

Character information
| Preview | ញ | | ຎ | | ญ | |
|---|---|---|---|---|---|---|
| Unicode name | KHMER LETTER NYO | | LAO LETTER PALI NYA | | THAI CHARACTER YO YING | |
| Encodings | decimal | hex | dec | hex | dec | hex |
| Unicode | 6025 | U+1789 | 3726 | U+0E8E | 3597 | U+0E0D |
| UTF-8 | 225 158 137 | E1 9E 89 | 224 186 142 | E0 BA 8E | 224 184 141 | E0 B8 8D |
| Numeric character reference | &#6025; | &#x1789; | &#3726; | &#xE8E; | &#3597; | &#xE0D; |

Character information
| Preview | ඤ | | 𑄐 | | 𑜐 | | 𑤕 | |
|---|---|---|---|---|---|---|---|---|
| Unicode name | SINHALA LETTER TAALUJA NAASIKYAYA | | CHAKMA LETTER NYAA | | AHOM LETTER NYA | | DIVES AKURU LETTER NYA | |
| Encodings | decimal | hex | dec | hex | dec | hex | dec | hex |
| Unicode | 3492 | U+0DA4 | 69904 | U+11110 | 71440 | U+11710 | 71957 | U+11915 |
| UTF-8 | 224 182 164 | E0 B6 A4 | 240 145 132 144 | F0 91 84 90 | 240 145 156 144 | F0 91 9C 90 | 240 145 164 149 | F0 91 A4 95 |
| UTF-16 | 3492 | 0DA4 | 55300 56592 | D804 DD10 | 55301 57104 | D805 DF10 | 55302 56597 | D806 DD15 |
| Numeric character reference | &#3492; | &#xDA4; | &#69904; | &#x11110; | &#71440; | &#x11710; | &#71957; | &#x11915; |

Character information
| Preview | 𑦷 | | 𑩥 | | | |
|---|---|---|---|---|---|---|
| Unicode name | NANDINAGARI LETTER NYA | | SOYOMBO LETTER NYA | | KAITHI LETTER NYA | |
| Encodings | decimal | hex | dec | hex | dec | hex |
| Unicode | 72119 | U+119B7 | 72293 | U+11A65 | 69782 | U+11096 |
| UTF-8 | 240 145 166 183 | F0 91 A6 B7 | 240 145 169 165 | F0 91 A9 A5 | 240 145 130 150 | F0 91 82 96 |
| UTF-16 | 55302 56759 | D806 DDB7 | 55302 56933 | D806 DE65 | 55300 56470 | D804 DC96 |
| Numeric character reference | &#72119; | &#x119B7; | &#72293; | &#x11A65; | &#69782; | &#x11096; |

Character information
| Preview | 𑱹 | |
|---|---|---|
| Unicode name | MARCHEN LETTER NYA | |
| Encodings | decimal | hex |
| Unicode | 72825 | U+11C79 |
| UTF-8 | 240 145 177 185 | F0 91 B1 B9 |
| UTF-16 | 55303 56441 | D807 DC79 |
| Numeric character reference | &#72825; | &#x11C79; |

Character information
| Preview | 𑠓 | | 𑊏 | |
|---|---|---|---|---|
| Unicode name | DOGRA LETTER NYA | | MULTANI LETTER NYA | |
| Encodings | decimal | hex | dec | hex |
| Unicode | 71699 | U+11813 | 70287 | U+1128F |
| UTF-8 | 240 145 160 147 | F0 91 A0 93 | 240 145 138 143 | F0 91 8A 8F |
| UTF-16 | 55302 56339 | D806 DC13 | 55300 56975 | D804 DE8F |
| Numeric character reference | &#71699; | &#x11813; | &#70287; | &#x1128F; |

Character information
| Preview | ᯠ | | ᨎ | | 𑻫 | |
|---|---|---|---|---|---|---|
| Unicode name | BATAK LETTER NYA | | BUGINESE LETTER NYA | | MAKASAR LETTER NYA | |
| Encodings | decimal | hex | dec | hex | dec | hex |
| Unicode | 7136 | U+1BE0 | 6670 | U+1A0E | 73451 | U+11EEB |
| UTF-8 | 225 175 160 | E1 AF A0 | 225 168 142 | E1 A8 8E | 240 145 187 171 | F0 91 BB AB |
| UTF-16 | 7136 | 1BE0 | 6670 | 1A0E | 55303 57067 | D807 DEEB |
| Numeric character reference | &#7136; | &#x1BE0; | &#6670; | &#x1A0E; | &#73451; | &#x11EEB; |

Character information
| Preview | 𑴕 | |
|---|---|---|
| Unicode name | MASARAM GONDI LETTER NYA | |
| Encodings | decimal | hex |
| Unicode | 72981 | U+11D15 |
| UTF-8 | 240 145 180 149 | F0 91 B4 95 |
| UTF-16 | 55303 56597 | D807 DD15 |
| Numeric character reference | &#72981; | &#x11D15; |
