= Śa =

Letter "Śa" in Indic scripts

Example glyphs
- Bengali–Assamese: Śa
- Tibetan: Śa
- Tamil: ஶ
- Thai: ศ
- Malayalam: ശ
- Sinhala: ශ
- Ashoka Brahmi: Śa
- Devanagari: Śa

Cognates
- Hebrew: ש
- Greek: Σ (Ϲ), Ϛ
- Latin: S (ſ), ẞ, Ʃ, Š
- Cyrillic: С, Ш, Щ

Properties
- Phonemic representation: /ʃ/
- IAST transliteration: ś Ś
- ISCII code point: D5 (213)

Śa or Sha is a consonant of Indic abugidas. In modern Indic scripts, Śa is derived from the early "Ashoka" Brahmi letter after having gone through the Gupta letter.

== Āryabhaṭa numeration ==
Aryabhata used Devanagari letters for numbers, very similar to the Greek numerals, even after the invention of Indian numerals. The values of the different forms of श are:

- श [ʃə] = 70 (७०)
- शि [ʃɪ] = 7,000 (७ ०००)
- शु [ʃʊ] = 700,000 (७ ०० ०००)
- शृ [ʃri] = 70,000,000 (७ ०० ०० ०००)
- शॢ [ʃlə] = 7×10^{9} (७×१०^{९})
- शे [ʃe] = 7×10^{11} (७×१०^{११})
- शै [ʃɛː] = 7×10^{13} (७×१०^{१३})
- शो [ʃoː] = 7×10^{15} (७×१०^{१५})
- शौ [ʃɔː] = 7×10^{17} (७×१०^{१७})

== Historic Sha ==
There are three different general early historic scripts - Brahmi and its variants, Kharoṣṭhī, and Tocharian, the so-called slanting Brahmi. Sha as found in standard Brahmi, was a simple geometric shape, with variations toward more flowing forms by the Gupta. The Tocharian Sha had an alternate Fremdzeichen form,. The third form of sha, in Kharoshthi was probably derived from Aramaic separately from the Brahmi letter.

=== Brahmi Sha ===
The Brahmi letter, Sha, is probably derived from the Aramaic Shin, and is thus related to the modern Latin S and Greek Sigma. Several identifiable styles of writing the Brahmi Sha can be found, most associated with a specific set of inscriptions from an artifact or diverse records from an historic period. As the earliest and most geometric style of Brahmi, the letters found on the Edicts of Ashoka and other records from around that time are normally the reference form for Brahmi letters, with vowel marks not attested until later forms of Brahmi back-formed to match the geometric writing style.

Brahmi Sha historic forms
Ashoka (3rd-1st c. BCE)	Girnar (~150 BCE)	Kushana (~150-250 CE)	Gujarat (~250 CE)	Gupta (~350 CE)
	No sample			

=== Tocharian Sha ===
The Tocharian letter is derived from the Brahmi, and has an alternate Fremdzeichen form used in conjuncts and as an alternate representation of Shä.

Tocharian Sha with vowel marks
Sha	Shā	Shi	Shī	Shu	Shū	Shr	Shr̄	She	Shai	Sho	Shau	Shä	Fremdzeichen

=== Kharoṣṭhī Sha ===
The Kharoṣṭhī letter is generally accepted as being derived from the Aramaic Shin, and is thus related to S and Sigma, in addition to the Brahmi Sha.

== Devanagari Śa ==
Devanagari Sha
Different presentations of Devanagari letter श.

Śa (श / श) is a consonant of the Devanagari abugida. It ultimately arose from the Brahmi letter, after having gone through the Gupta letter. Letters that derive from it are the Gujarati letter શ, and the Modi letter 𑘫.

The letter has several alternate forms. The most common form found in modern typography has a full horizontal headline, with a "2"-shape loop directly touching or even overlapping the headline at its top. Its tail may or may not touch the following vertical stem. A second form has a headline only over the vertical stem. A third form is found more commonly in traditional Marathi-language typography and has a full horizontal headline, and a "2"-shape without loop that is lowered slightly and connected to the headline with a small ascender at its top.

=== Devanagari-using Languages ===
In all languages, श is pronounced as [ʃə] or [ʃ] when appropriate. Like all Indic scripts, Devanagari uses vowel marks attached to the base consonant to override the inherent /ə/ vowel:

Devanagari श with vowel marks
Śa	Śā	Śi	Śī	Śu	Śū	Śr	Śr̄	Śl	Śl̄	Śe	Śai	Śo	Śau	Ś
श	शा	शि	शी	शु	शू	शृ	शॄ	शॢ	शॣ	शे	शै	शो	शौ	श्

=== Conjuncts with श ===
Half form of Śa.

Half form of Ribbon Śa.

Devanagari exhibits conjunct ligatures, as is common in Indic scripts. In modern Devanagari texts, most conjuncts are formed by reducing the letter shape to fit tightly to the following letter, usually by dropping a character's vertical stem, sometimes referred to as a "half form". Some conjunct clusters are always represented by a true ligature, instead of a shape that can be broken into constituent independent letters. Vertically stacked conjuncts are ubiquitous in older texts, while only a few are still used routinely in modern Devanagari texts. Śa is unique in having an alternate form found only in conjuncts, sometimes called "Ribbon Śa", that appears as both a half form in horizontal conjuncts and as an element in vertical conjuncts. The use of ligatures and vertical conjuncts may vary across languages using the Devanagari script, with Marathi in particular preferring the use of half forms where texts in other languages would show ligatures and vertical stacks.

==== Ligature conjuncts of श ====
True ligatures are quite rare in Indic scripts. The most common ligated conjuncts in Devanagari are in the form of a slight mutation to fit in context or as a consistent variant form appended to the adjacent characters. Those variants include Na and the Repha and Rakar forms of Ra. Nepali and Marathi texts use the "eyelash" Ra half form for an initial "R" instead of repha.

- Repha र্ (r) + श (ʃa) gives the ligature rʃa: ^{note}

- Eyelash र্ (r) + श (ʃa) gives the ligature rʃa:

- श্ (ʃ) + न (na) gives the ligature ʃna:

- श্ (ʃ) + rakar र (ra) gives the ligature ʃra:

==== Stacked conjuncts of श ====
Vertically stacked ligatures are the most common conjunct forms found in Devanagari text. Although the constituent characters may need to be stretched and moved slightly in order to stack neatly, stacked conjuncts can be broken down into recognizable base letters, or a letter and an otherwise standard ligature.

- छ্ (cʰ) + श (ʃa) gives the ligature cʰʃa:

- ढ্ (ḍʱ) + श (ʃa) gives the ligature ḍʱʃa:

- ड্ (ḍ) + श (ʃa) gives the ligature ḍʃa:

- द্ (d) + श (ʃa) gives the ligature dʃa:

- ज্ (j) + श (ʃa) gives the ligature jʃa:

- ङ্ (ŋ) + श (ʃa) gives the ligature ŋʃa:

- श্ (ʃ) + ब (ba) gives the ligature ʃba:

- श্ (ʃ) + च (ca) gives the ligature ʃca:

- श্ (ʃ) + ज (ja) gives the ligature ʃja:

- श্ (ʃ) + ज্ (j) + ञ (ña) gives the ligature ʃjña:

- श্ (ʃ) + ल (la) gives the ligature ʃla:

- श্ (ʃ) + ळ (ḷa) gives the ligature ʃḷa:

- श্ (ʃ) + ञ (ña) gives the ligature ʃña:

- श্ (ʃ) + श (ʃa) gives the ligature ʃʃa:

- श্ (ʃ) + व (va) gives the ligature ʃva:

- ठ্ (ṭʰ) + श (ʃa) gives the ligature ṭʰʃa:

- ट্ (ṭ) + श (ʃa) gives the ligature ṭʃa:

== Bengali Sha ==
The Bengali script শ is derived from the Siddhaṃ, and is marked by the lack of a horizontal head line, unlike the reduced head line of its Devanagari counterpart, श. The inherent vowel of Bengali consonant letters is /ɔ/, so the bare letter শ will sometimes be transliterated as "sho" instead of "sha". Adding okar, the "o" vowel mark, gives a reading of /ʃo/. Like all Indic consonants, শ can be modified by marks to indicate another (or no) vowel than its inherent "a".

Bengali শ with vowel marks
sha	shā	shi	shī	shu	shū	shr	shr̄	she	shai	sho	shau	sh
শ	শা	শি	শী	শু	শূ	শৃ	শৄ	শে	শৈ	শো	শৌ	শ্

=== শ in Bengali-using languages ===
শ is used as a basic consonant character in all of the major Bengali script orthographies, including Bengali and Assamese.

=== Conjuncts with শ ===
Bengali শ exhibits conjunct ligatures, as is common in Indic scripts, with a tendency towards stacked ligatures.

==== Other conjuncts of শ ====
- র্ (r) + শ (ʃa) gives the ligature rʃa, with the repha prefix:

- র্ (r) + শ্ (ʃ) + ব (va) gives the ligature rʃva, with the repha prefix and va phala suffix:

- র্ (r) + শ্ (ʃ) + য (ya) gives the ligature rʃya, with the ya phala suffix:

- শ্ (ʃ) + চ (ca) gives the ligature ʃca:

- শ্ (ʃ) + ছ (cʰa) gives the ligature ʃcʰa:

- শ্ (ʃ) + ল (la) gives the ligature ʃla:

- শ্ (ʃ) + ম (ma) gives the ligature ʃma:

- শ্ (ʃ) + ন (na) gives the ligature ʃna:

- শ্ (ʃ) + র (ra) gives the ligature ʃra, with the ra phala suffix:

- শ্ (ʃ) + ব (va) gives the ligature ʃva, with the va phala suffix:

- শ্ (ʃ) + য (ya) gives the ligature ʃya, with the ya phala suffix:

== Gujarati Śa ==
Gujarati Śa.

Śa (શ) is the thirtieth consonant of the Gujarati abugida. It is derived from the Devanagari Śa with the top bar (shiro rekha) removed, and ultimately the Brahmi letter.

=== Gujarati-using Languages ===
The Gujarati script is used to write the Gujarati and Kutchi languages. In both languages, શ is pronounced as [ʃə] or [ʃ] when appropriate. Like all Indic scripts, Gujarati uses vowel marks attached to the base consonant to override the inherent /ə/ vowel:

Śa	Śā	Śi	Śī	Śu	Śū	Śr	Śl	Śr̄	Śl̄	Śĕ	Śe	Śai	Śŏ	Śo	Śau	Ś
Gujarati Śa syllables, with vowel marks in red.

=== Conjuncts with શ ===
Half form of Śa.

Gujarati શ exhibits conjunct ligatures, much like its parent Devanagari Script. Most Gujarati conjuncts can only be formed by reducing the letter shape to fit tightly to the following letter, usually by dropping a character's vertical stem, sometimes referred to as a "half form". A few conjunct clusters can be represented by a true ligature, instead of a shape that can be broken into constituent independent letters, and vertically stacked conjuncts can also be found in Gujarati, although much less commonly than in Devanagari. True ligatures are quite rare in Indic scripts. The most common ligated conjuncts in Gujarati are in the form of a slight mutation to fit in context or as a consistent variant form appended to the adjacent characters. Those variants include Na and the Repha and Rakar forms of Ra.

- ર્ (r) + શ (ʃa) gives the ligature RŚa:

- શ્ (ʃ) + ર (ra) gives the ligature ŚRa:

- શ્ (ʃ) + ચ (ca) gives the ligature ŚCa:

- શ્ (ʃ) + ન (na) gives the ligature ŚNa:

- શ્ (ʃ) + લ (la) gives the ligature ŚLa:

- શ્ (ʃ) + વ (va) gives the ligature ŚVa:

== Telugu Śa ==
Telugu independent and subjoined Śa.

Śa (శ) is a consonant of the Telugu abugida. It ultimately arose from the Brahmi letter. It is closely related to the Kannada letter ಶ. Most Telugu consonants contain a v-shaped headstroke that is related to the horizontal headline found in other Indic scripts, although headstrokes do not connect adjacent letters in Telugu. The headstroke is normally lost when adding vowel matras. Telugu conjuncts are created by reducing trailing letters to a subjoined form that appears below the initial consonant of the conjunct. Many subjoined forms are created by dropping their headline, with many extending the end of the stroke of the main letter body to form an extended tail reaching up to the right of the preceding consonant. This subjoining of trailing letters to create conjuncts is in contrast to the leading half forms of Devanagari and Bengali letters. Ligature conjuncts are not a feature in Telugu, with the only non-standard construction being an alternate subjoined form of Ṣa (borrowed from Kannada) in the KṢa conjunct.

== Malayalam Śa ==
Malayalam letter Śa

Śa (ശ) is a consonant of the Malayalam abugida. It ultimately arose from the Brahmi letter, via the Grantha letter Sha. Like in other Indic scripts, Malayalam consonants have the inherent vowel "a", and take one of several modifying vowel signs to represent syllables with another vowel or no vowel at all.

Malayalam Sha matras: Sha, Shā, Shi, Shī, Shu, Shū, Shr̥, Shr̥̄, Shl̥, Shl̥̄, She, Shē, Shai, Sho, Shō, Shau, and Sh.

=== Conjuncts of ശ ===
As is common in Indic scripts, Malayalam joins letters together to form conjunct consonant clusters. There are several ways in which conjuncts are formed in Malayalam texts: using a post-base form of a trailing consonant placed under the initial consonant of a conjunct, a combined ligature of two or more consonants joined together, a conjoining form that appears as a combining mark on the rest of the conjunct, the use of an explicit candrakkala mark to suppress the inherent "a" vowel, or a special consonant form called a "chillu" letter, representing a bare consonant without the inherent "a" vowel. Texts written with the modern reformed Malayalam orthography, put̪iya lipi, may favor more regular conjunct forms than older texts in paḻaya lipi, due to changes undertaken in the 1970s by the Government of Kerala.

- ശ് (ʃ) + ന (na) gives the ligature ʃna:

- ശ് (ʃ) + മ (ma) gives the ligature ʃma:

- ശ് (ʃ) + ശ (ʃa) gives the ligature ʃʃa:

== Odia Śa ==
Odia independent and subjoined letter Śa.

Śa (ଶ) is a consonant of the Odia abugida. It ultimately arose from the Brahmi letter, via the Siddhaṃ letter Sha. Like in other Indic scripts, Odia consonants have the inherent vowel "a", and take one of several modifying vowel signs to represent syllables with another vowel or no vowel at all.

Odia Sha with vowel matras
Śa	Śā	Śi	Śī	Śu	Śū	Śr̥	Śr̥̄	Śl̥	Śl̥̄	Śe	Śai	Śo	Śau	Ś
ଶ	ଶା	ଶି	ଶୀ	ଶୁ	ଶୂ	ଶୃ	ଶୄ	ଶୢ	ଶୣ	ଶେ	ଶୈ	ଶୋ	ଶୌ	ଶ୍

As is common in Indic scripts, Odia joins letters together to form conjunct consonant clusters. The most common conjunct formation is achieved by using a small subjoined form of trailing consonants. Most consonants' subjoined forms are identical to the full form, just reduced in size, although a few drop the curved headline or have a subjoined form not directly related to the full form of the consonant. The second type of conjunct formation is through pure ligatures, where the constituent consonants are written together in a single graphic form. ଶ generates conjuncts only by subjoining and does not form ligatures, although the subjoined form of Cha used with Sha is irregular:

- ଶ୍ (ś) + ଛ (cha) gives the ligature ścha:

== Kaithi Śa ==
Kaithi consonant and half-form Śa.

Śa (𑂬) is a consonant of the Kaithi abugida. It ultimately arose from the Brahmi letter, via the Siddhaṃ letter Sha. Like in other Indic scripts, Kaithi consonants have the inherent vowel "a", and take one of several modifying vowel signs to represent syllables with another vowel or no vowel at all.

Kaithi Sha with vowel matras
Sha	Shā	Shi	Shī	Shu	Shū	She	Shai	Sho	Shau	Sh
𑂬	𑂬𑂰	𑂬𑂱	𑂬𑂲	𑂬𑂳	𑂬𑂴	𑂬𑂵	𑂬𑂶	𑂬𑂷	𑂬𑂸	𑂬𑂹

=== Conjuncts of 𑂬 ===
As is common in Indic scripts, Kaithi joins letters together to form conjunct consonant clusters. The most common conjunct formation is achieved by using a half form of preceding consonants, although several consonants use an explicit virama. Most half forms are derived from the full form by removing the vertical stem. As is common in most Indic scripts, conjuncts of ra are indicated with a repha or rakar mark attached to the rest of the consonant cluster. In addition, there are a few vertical conjuncts that can be found in Kaithi writing, but true ligatures are not used in the modern Kaithi script.

- 𑂩୍ (r) + 𑂬 (ʃa) gives the ligature rʃa:

== Tirhuta Śa ==
Tirhuta consonant Śa

Śa (𑒬) is a consonant of the Tirhuta abugida. It ultimately arose from the Brahmi letter, via the Siddhaṃ letter Sha. Like in other Indic scripts, Tirhuta consonants have the inherent vowel "a", and take one of several modifying vowel signs to represent sylables with another vowel or no vowel at all.

Tirhuta Śa with vowel matras
Śa	Śā	Śi	Śī	Śu	Śū	Śṛ	Śṝ	Śḷ	Śḹ	Śē	Śe	Śai	Śō	Śo	Śau	Ś
𑒬	𑒬𑒰	𑒬𑒱	𑒬𑒲	𑒬𑒳	𑒬𑒴	𑒬𑒵	𑒬𑒶	𑒬𑒷	𑒬𑒸	𑒬𑒹	𑒬𑒺	𑒬𑒻	𑒬𑒼	𑒬𑒽	𑒬𑒾	𑒬𑓂

=== Conjuncts of 𑒬 ===
As is common in Indic scripts, Tirhuta joins letters together to form conjunct consonant clusters. The most common conjunct formation is achieved by using an explicit virama. As is common in most Indic scripts, conjuncts of ra are indicated with a repha or rakar mark attached to the rest of the consonant cluster. In addition, other consonants take unique combining forms when in conjunct with other letters, and there are several vertical conjuncts and true ligatures that can be found in Tirhuta writing.

- 𑒩୍ (r) + 𑒬 (ʃa) gives the ligature rʃa:

- 𑒬୍ (ʃ) + 𑒔 (ca) gives the ligature ʃca:

- 𑒬୍ (ʃ) + 𑒕 (cʰa) gives the ligature ʃcʰa:

- 𑒬୍ (ʃ) + 𑒪 (la) gives the ligature ʃla:

- 𑒬୍ (ʃ) + 𑒩 (ra) gives the ligature ʃra:

- 𑒬 (ʃ) + 𑒅 (u) gives the ligature ʃu:

- 𑒬୍ (ʃ) + 𑒫 (va) gives the ligature ʃva:

- 𑒬୍ (ʃ) + 𑒨 (ya) gives the ligature ʃya:

- 𑒞୍ (t) + 𑒬 (ʃa) gives the ligature tʃa:

== Comparison of Śa ==
The various Indic scripts are generally related to each other through adaptation and borrowing, and as such the glyphs for cognate letters, including Śa, are related as well.

Comparison of Śa in different scripts

Aramaic
Kharoṣṭhī 𐨭	Ashoka Brahmi	Kushana Brahmi (Note: The middle "Kushana" form of Brahmi is a later style that emerged as Brahmi scripts were beginning to proliferate. Gupta Brahmi was definitely a stylistic descendant from Kushana, but other Brahmi-derived scripts may have descended from earlier forms.)	Tocharian (Note: Tocharian is probably derived from the middle period "Kushana" form of Brahmi, although artifacts from that time are not plentiful enough to establish a definite succession.) /
Gupta Brahmi	Pallava
Kadamba -
Bhaiksuki 𑰫	Siddhaṃ	Grantha 𑌶	Cham -
Sinhala ශ	Pyu / Old Mon (Note: Pyu and Old Mon are probably the precursors of the Burmese script, and may be derived from either the Pallava or Kadamba script) -
Tibetan	Newa 𑐱	Ahom -	Malayalam ശ
Telugu శ	Burmese ၐ
Lepcha ᰡ	Ranjana	Saurashtra ꢯ	Dives Akuru 𑤪
Kannada ಶ	Kayah Li ꤏ
Limbu ᤙ	Soyombo (Note: May also be derived from Devangari (see bottom left of table)) 𑩿	Khmer ឝ	Tamil ஶ
Chakma -	Tai Tham ᩆ
Meitei Mayek ꫩ	Gaudi -	Thai ศ	Lao ຨ
Tai Le -
Marchen 𑲌	Tirhuta 𑒬	New Tai Lue -	Tai Viet -	Aksara Kawi
'Phags-pa ꡚ	Odia ଶ	Sharada 𑆯	Rejang -	Batak -	Buginese -
Zanabazar Square 𑨮	Bengali-Assamese	Takri 𑚧	Javanese ꦯ	Balinese ᬰ	Makasar -
Hangul (Note: The Origin of Hangul from 'Phags-pa is one of limited influence, inspiring at most a few basic letter shapes. Hangul does not function as an Indic abugida.) -	Northern Nagari -	Dogri 𑠧	Laṇḍā -	Sundanese ᮯ	Baybayin -
Modi 𑘫	Gujarati શ	Khojki -	Khudabadi 𑋜	Mahajani -	Tagbanwa -
Devanagari	Nandinagari 𑧋	Kaithi	Gurmukhi ਸ਼	Multani -	Buhid -
Canadian Syllabics (Note: Although the basic letter forms of the Canadian Aboriginal Syllabics were derived from handwritten Devanagari letters, this abugida indicates vowel sounds by rotations of the letter form, rather than the use of vowel diacritics as is standard in Indic abugidas.) -	Soyombo (Note: May also be derived from Ranjana (see above)) 𑩿	Sylheti Nagari -	Gunjala Gondi -	Masaram Gondi (Note: Masaram Gondi acts as an Indic abugida, but its letterforms were not derived from any single precursor script.) 𑴩	Hanuno'o -

== Character encodings of Śa ==
Most Indic scripts are encoded in the Unicode Standard, and as such the letter Śa in those scripts can be represented in plain text with unique codepoint. Śa from several modern-use scripts can also be found in legacy encodings, such as ISCII.

Character information
Preview					ஶ		శ		ଶ		ಶ		ശ		શ		ਸ਼	
Unicode name	DEVANAGARI LETTER SHA		BENGALI LETTER SHA		TAMIL LETTER SHA		TELUGU LETTER SHA		ORIYA LETTER SHA		KANNADA LETTER SHA		MALAYALAM LETTER SHA		GUJARATI LETTER SHA		GURMUKHI LETTER SHA	
Encodings	decimal	hex	dec	hex	dec	hex	dec	hex	dec	hex	dec	hex	dec	hex	dec	hex	dec	hex
Unicode	2358	U+0936	2486	U+09B6	2998	U+0BB6	3126	U+0C36	2870	U+0B36	3254	U+0CB6	3382	U+0D36	2742	U+0AB6	2614	U+0A36
UTF-8	224 164 182	E0 A4 B6	224 166 182	E0 A6 B6	224 174 182	E0 AE B6	224 176 182	E0 B0 B6	224 172 182	E0 AC B6	224 178 182	E0 B2 B6	224 180 182	E0 B4 B6	224 170 182	E0 AA B6	224 168 182	E0 A8 B6
Numeric character reference	&#2358;	&#x936;	&#2486;	&#x9B6;	&#2998;	&#xBB6;	&#3126;	&#xC36;	&#2870;	&#xB36;	&#3254;	&#xCB6;	&#3382;	&#xD36;	&#2742;	&#xAB6;	&#2614;	&#xA36;
ISCII	213	D5	213	D5	213	D5	213	D5	213	D5	213	D5	213	D5	213	D5	213	D5

Character information
Preview	Ashoka Kushana Gupta		𐨭				𑌶	
Unicode name	BRAHMI LETTER SHA		KHAROSHTHI LETTER SHA		SIDDHAM LETTER SHA		GRANTHA LETTER SHA	
Encodings	decimal	hex	dec	hex	dec	hex	dec	hex
Unicode	69680	U+11030	68141	U+10A2D	71083	U+115AB	70454	U+11336
UTF-8	240 145 128 176	F0 91 80 B0	240 144 168 173	F0 90 A8 AD	240 145 150 171	F0 91 96 AB	240 145 140 182	F0 91 8C B6
UTF-16	55300 56368	D804 DC30	55298 56877	D802 DE2D	55301 56747	D805 DDAB	55300 57142	D804 DF36
Numeric character reference	&#69680;	&#x11030;	&#68141;	&#x10A2D;	&#71083;	&#x115AB;	&#70454;	&#x11336;

Character information
Preview			ྴ		ꡚ		𑨮		𑐱		𑰫		𑆯	
Unicode name	TIBETAN LETTER SHA		TIBETAN SUBJOINED LETTER SHA		PHAGS-PA LETTER SHA		ZANABAZAR SQUARE LETTER SHA		NEWA LETTER SHA		BHAIKSUKI LETTER SHA		SHARADA LETTER SHA	
Encodings	decimal	hex	dec	hex	dec	hex	dec	hex	dec	hex	dec	hex	dec	hex
Unicode	3940	U+0F64	4020	U+0FB4	43098	U+A85A	72238	U+11A2E	70705	U+11431	72747	U+11C2B	70063	U+111AF
UTF-8	224 189 164	E0 BD A4	224 190 180	E0 BE B4	234 161 154	EA A1 9A	240 145 168 174	F0 91 A8 AE	240 145 144 177	F0 91 90 B1	240 145 176 171	F0 91 B0 AB	240 145 134 175	F0 91 86 AF
UTF-16	3940	0F64	4020	0FB4	43098	A85A	55302 56878	D806 DE2E	55301 56369	D805 DC31	55303 56363	D807 DC2B	55300 56751	D804 DDAF
Numeric character reference	&#3940;	&#xF64;	&#4020;	&#xFB4;	&#43098;	&#xA85A;	&#72238;	&#x11A2E;	&#70705;	&#x11431;	&#72747;	&#x11C2B;	&#70063;	&#x111AF;

Character information
Preview	ၐ		ᩆ	
Unicode name	MYANMAR LETTER SHA		TAI THAM LETTER HIGH SHA	
Encodings	decimal	hex	dec	hex
Unicode	4176	U+1050	6726	U+1A46
UTF-8	225 129 144	E1 81 90	225 169 134	E1 A9 86
Numeric character reference	&#4176;	&#x1050;	&#6726;	&#x1A46;

Character information
Preview	ឝ		ຨ		ศ	
Unicode name	KHMER LETTER SHA		LAO LETTER SANSKRIT SHA		THAI CHARACTER SO SALA	
Encodings	decimal	hex	dec	hex	dec	hex
Unicode	6045	U+179D	3752	U+0EA8	3624	U+0E28
UTF-8	225 158 157	E1 9E 9D	224 186 168	E0 BA A8	224 184 168	E0 B8 A8
Numeric character reference	&#6045;	&#x179D;	&#3752;	&#xEA8;	&#3624;	&#xE28;

Character information
Preview	ශ		ꤏ		𑤪		ꢯ	
Unicode name	SINHALA LETTER TAALUJA SAYANNA		KAYAH LI LETTER SHA		DIVES AKURU LETTER SHA		SAURASHTRA LETTER SHA	
Encodings	decimal	hex	dec	hex	dec	hex	dec	hex
Unicode	3521	U+0DC1	43279	U+A90F	71978	U+1192A	43183	U+A8AF
UTF-8	224 183 129	E0 B7 81	234 164 143	EA A4 8F	240 145 164 170	F0 91 A4 AA	234 162 175	EA A2 AF
UTF-16	3521	0DC1	43279	A90F	55302 56618	D806 DD2A	43183	A8AF
Numeric character reference	&#3521;	&#xDC1;	&#43279;	&#xA90F;	&#71978;	&#x1192A;	&#43183;	&#xA8AF;

Character information
Preview	𑘫		𑧋		𑩿			
Unicode name	MODI LETTER SHA		NANDINAGARI LETTER SHA		SOYOMBO LETTER SHA		KAITHI LETTER SHA	
Encodings	decimal	hex	dec	hex	dec	hex	dec	hex
Unicode	71211	U+1162B	72139	U+119CB	72319	U+11A7F	69804	U+110AC
UTF-8	240 145 152 171	F0 91 98 AB	240 145 167 139	F0 91 A7 8B	240 145 169 191	F0 91 A9 BF	240 145 130 172	F0 91 82 AC
UTF-16	55301 56875	D805 DE2B	55302 56779	D806 DDCB	55302 56959	D806 DE7F	55300 56492	D804 DCAC
Numeric character reference	&#71211;	&#x1162B;	&#72139;	&#x119CB;	&#72319;	&#x11A7F;	&#69804;	&#x110AC;

Character information
Preview	𑒬		ᰡ		ᤙ		ꫩ		𑲌	
Unicode name	TIRHUTA LETTER SHA		LEPCHA LETTER SHA		LIMBU LETTER SHA		MEETEI MAYEK LETTER SHA		MARCHEN LETTER SHA	
Encodings	decimal	hex	dec	hex	dec	hex	dec	hex	dec	hex
Unicode	70828	U+114AC	7201	U+1C21	6425	U+1919	43753	U+AAE9	72844	U+11C8C
UTF-8	240 145 146 172	F0 91 92 AC	225 176 161	E1 B0 A1	225 164 153	E1 A4 99	234 171 169	EA AB A9	240 145 178 140	F0 91 B2 8C
UTF-16	55301 56492	D805 DCAC	7201	1C21	6425	1919	43753	AAE9	55303 56460	D807 DC8C
Numeric character reference	&#70828;	&#x114AC;	&#7201;	&#x1C21;	&#6425;	&#x1919;	&#43753;	&#xAAE9;	&#72844;	&#x11C8C;

Character information
Preview	𑚧		𑠧		𑋜	
Unicode name	TAKRI LETTER SHA		DOGRA LETTER SHA		KHUDAWADI LETTER SHA	
Encodings	decimal	hex	dec	hex	dec	hex
Unicode	71335	U+116A7	71719	U+11827	70364	U+112DC
UTF-8	240 145 154 167	F0 91 9A A7	240 145 160 167	F0 91 A0 A7	240 145 139 156	F0 91 8B 9C
UTF-16	55301 56999	D805 DEA7	55302 56359	D806 DC27	55300 57052	D804 DEDC
Numeric character reference	&#71335;	&#x116A7;	&#71719;	&#x11827;	&#70364;	&#x112DC;

Character information
Preview	ᬰ		ꦯ	
Unicode name	BALINESE LETTER SA SAGA		JAVANESE LETTER SA MURDA	
Encodings	decimal	hex	dec	hex
Unicode	6960	U+1B30	43439	U+A9AF
UTF-8	225 172 176	E1 AC B0	234 166 175	EA A6 AF
Numeric character reference	&#6960;	&#x1B30;	&#43439;	&#xA9AF;

Character information
Preview	𑴩	
Unicode name	MASARAM GONDI LETTER SHA	
Encodings	decimal	hex
Unicode	73001	U+11D29
UTF-8	240 145 180 169	F0 91 B4 A9
UTF-16	55303 56617	D807 DD29
Numeric character reference	&#73001;	&#x11D29;
