= Gunjala =

- Village
- Location in Telangana, India Gunjala (India)
- Coordinates: 19.8°N 78.4°E
- Country: India
- State: Telangana
- District: Adilabad district

Government
  - Body: Gram Panchayat

Population (2011)
  - Total: 876

Languages
  - Spoken: Gondi, Telugu
- Time zone: UTC+5:30 (IST)
- Postal code: 568954
- Vehicle registration: TS-01

Gunjala is a village in the Adilabad district of Telangana, India.

== Demographics ==
As of 2011 India census, Gunjala had a population of 876. Of this figure, 474, or 54%, were males, while 402, or 46%, were females. Gunjala has a literacy rate of 48.7%, lower than the national average of 59.5%: male literacy is 55.7%, and female literacy is 40.5%. In Gunjala, 13.7% of the population is at or under 6 years of age.

== Geography ==
To the north of the village lies the Penganga River, which demarcates the border between Telangana and Maharashtra. The village lies approximately 25 km from the center of the district capital, Adilabad.

== Significance ==
In 2006, the village emerged as a center of ethnic and linguistic significance for the Gondi people. The Gondi language has often been regarded as a Dravidian language without a script and was written using Telugu script and Devanagari. The revelation of a dozen manuscripts written in a native script, now called "Gunjala Gondi Lipi" in honor of the village, and comprehensible to a handful of elders in the village has received national media coverage as an invigorating discovery of the lost heritage of the Gondi people. The Gunjala Gondi Lipi has been released by a team of researchers from the University of Hyderabad, headed by Professor Jayadheer Tirumala Rao.

== Transport ==
Gunjala is poorly connected by road. A train station is not evident in the near vicinity.

== See also ==
- Gunjala Gondi Lipi
- Gondi language
- Gondi script
- Adilabad district
