= Ṣa (Indic) =

Letter "Ṣa" in Indic scripts

Example glyphs
- Bengali–Assamese: Ṣa
- Tibetan: ཥ
- Tamil: ஷ
- Thai: ษ
- Malayalam: ഷ
- Sinhala: ෂ
- Ashoka Brahmi: Ṣa
- Devanagari: Ṣa

Cognates
- Hebrew: ס
- Greek: Ξ
- Cyrillic: Ѯ

Properties
- Phonemic representation: /ʂ/
- IAST transliteration: ṣ Ṣ
- ISCII code point: D6 (214)

Ṣa (sha) is a consonant of Indic abugidas. In modern Indic scripts, Ssa is derived from the early "Ashoka" Brahmi letter after having gone through the Gupta letter.

== Āryabhaṭa numeration ==
Aryabhata used Devanagari letters for numbers, very similar to the Greek numerals, even after the invention of Indian numerals. The values of the different forms of ष are:

- ष [ʂə] = 80 (८०)
- षि [ʂɪ] = 8,000 (८ ०००)
- षु [ʂʊ] = 800,000 (८ ०० ०००)
- षृ [ʂri] = 80,000,000 (८ ०० ०० ०००)
- षॢ [ʂlə] = 8×10^{9} (८×१०^{९})
- षे [ʂe] = 8×10^{11} (८×१०^{११})
- षै [ʂɛː] = 8×10^{13} (८×१०^{१३})
- षो [ʂoː] = 8×10^{15} (८×१०^{१५})
- षौ [ʂɔː] = 8×10^{17} (८×१०^{१७})

== Historic Ṣa ==
There are three different general early historic scripts - Brahmi and its variants, Kharoṣṭhī, and Tocharian, the so-called slanting Brahmi. Ssa as found in standard Brahmi, was a simple geometric shape, with variations toward more flowing forms by the Gupta. The Tocharian Ssa had an alternate Fremdzeichen form,. The third form of ssa, in Kharoshthi was probably derived from Aramaic separately from the Brahmi letter.

=== Brahmi Ṣa ===
The Brahmi letter, Ssa, is probably derived from the Aramaic Samekh, and is thus related to the modern Greek Xi. Several identifiable styles of writing the Brahmi Ssa can be found, most associated with a specific set of inscriptions from an artifact or diverse records from an historic period. As the earliest and most geometric style of Brahmi, the letters found on the Edicts of Ashoka and other records from around that time are normally the reference form for Brahmi letters, with vowel marks not attested until later forms of Brahmi back-formed to match the geometric writing style.

Brahmi Ssa historic forms
Ashoka (3rd-1st c. BCE)	Girnar (~150 BCE)	Kushana (~150-250 CE)	Gujarat (~250 CE)	Gupta (~350 CE)
	No sample			

=== Tocharian Ṣa ===
The Tocharian letter is derived from the Brahmi, and has an alternate Fremdzeichen form used in conjuncts and as an alternate representation of ṣä.

Tocharian ṣa with vowel marks
ṣa	ṣā	ṣi	ṣī	ṣu	ṣū	ṣr̥	ṣr̥̄	ṣe	ṣai	ṣo	ṣau	ṣä	Fremdzeichen

=== Kharoṣṭhī Ṣa ===
The Kharoṣṭhī letter is generally accepted as being derived from the Aramaic Heth, and is thus related to H and Eta.

== Devanagari Ṣa ==
Ṣa (ष) is a consonant of the Devanagari abugida. It ultimately arose from the Brahmi letter, after having gone through the Gupta letter. Letters that derive from it are the Gujarati letter ષ, and the Modi letter 𑘬.

=== Devanagari-using Languages ===
In most modern languages, ष is pronounced as [ʂə] or [ʂ] when appropriate. In ancient and medieval Nepali however, ष was sometimes a homophone of श, pronounced [kʰ], while in modern Nepali, it is [s]. Like all Indic scripts, Devanagari uses vowel marks attached to the base consonant to override the inherent /ə/ vowel:

Devanagari ष with vowel marks
Ṣa	Ṣā	Ṣi	Ṣī	Ṣu	Ṣū	Ṣr̥	Ṣr̥̄	Ṣl̥	Ṣl̥̄	Ṣe	Ṣai	Ṣo	Ṣau	Ṣ
ष	षा	षि	षी	षु	षू	षृ	षॄ	षॢ	षॣ	षे	षै	षो	षौ	ष्

=== Conjuncts with ष ===
Half form of Ssa.

Devanagari exhibits conjunct ligatures, as is common in Indic scripts. In modern Devanagari texts, most conjuncts are formed by reducing the letter shape to fit tightly to the following letter, usually by dropping a character's vertical stem, sometimes referred to as a "half form". Some conjunct clusters are always represented by a true ligature, instead of a shape that can be broken into constituent independent letters. Vertically stacked conjuncts are ubiquitous in older texts, while only a few are still used routinely in modern Devanagari texts. The use of ligatures and vertical conjuncts may vary across languages using the Devanagari script, with Marathi in particular preferring the use of half forms where texts in other languages would show ligatures and vertical stacks.

==== Ligature conjuncts of ष ====
True ligatures are quite rare in Indic scripts. The most common ligated conjuncts in Devanagari are in the form of a slight mutation to fit in context or as a consistent variant form appended to the adjacent characters. Those variants include Na and the Repha and Rakar forms of Ra. Nepali and Marathi texts use the "eyelash" Ra half form for an initial "R" instead of repha.

- Repha र্ (r) + ष (ṣa) gives the ligature rṣa: ^{note}

- Eyelash र্ (r) + ष (ṣa) gives the ligature rṣa:

- ष্ (ṣ) + rakar र (ra) gives the ligature ṣra:

- ष্ (ṣ) + क্ (k) + rakar र (ra) gives the ligature ṣkra:

- ष্ (ṣ) + ढ (ḍʱa) gives the ligature ṣḍʱa:

- ष্ (ṣ) + न (na) gives the ligature ṣna:

- ष্ (ṣ) + त (ta) gives the ligature ṣta:

- ष্ (ṣ) + ट (ṭa) gives the ligature ṣṭa:

- Repha र্ (r) + ष্ (ṣ) + ट্ (ṭ) + rakar र (ra) gives the ligature rṣṭra:

- ष্ (ṣ) + ठ (ṭʰa) gives the ligature ṣṭʰa:

- ष্ (ṣ) + ठ্ (ṭʰ) + य (ya) gives the ligature ṣṭʰya:

- ष্ (ṣ) + ट্ (ṭ) + व (va) gives the ligature ṣṭva:

==== Devanagari Kṣa ====
Kṣa half form

One of the most common true ligatures in Devanagari is the conjunct kṣa क्ष. This ligature is a required form for most Devanagari languages, and the conjunct even has its own half form that freely joins other letters in horizontal conjuncts.

- क্ (k) + ष (ṣa) gives the ligature kṣa:

- Repha र্ (r) + क্ (k) + ष (ṣa) gives the ligature rkṣa:

- Eyelash र্ (r) + क্ (k) + ष (ṣa) gives the ligature rkṣa:

- छ্ (cʰ) + क্ (k) + ष (ṣa) gives the ligature cʰkṣa:

- ढ্ (ḍʱ) + क্ (k) + ष (ṣa) gives the ligature ḍʱkṣa:

- ड্ (ḍ) + क্ (k) + ष (ṣa) gives the ligature ḍkṣa:

- द্ (d) + क্ (k) + ष (ṣa) gives the ligature dkṣa:

- ङ্ (ŋ) + क্ (k) + ष (ṣa) gives the ligature ŋkṣa:

- ङ্ (ŋ) + क্ (k) + ष্ (ṣ) + य (ya) gives the ligature ŋkṣya:

- ट্ (ṭ) + क্ (k) + ष (ṣa) gives the ligature ṭkṣa:

- ठ্ (ṭʰ) + क্ (k) + ष (ṣa) gives the ligature ṭʰkṣa:

==== Stacked conjuncts of ष ====
Vertically stacked ligatures are the most common conjunct forms found in Devanagari text. Although the constituent characters may need to be stretched and moved slightly in order to stack neatly, stacked conjuncts can be broken down into recognizable base letters, or a letter and an otherwise standard ligature.

- छ্ (cʰ) + ष (ṣa) gives the ligature cʰṣa:

- ढ্ (ḍʱ) + ष (ṣa) gives the ligature ḍʱṣa:

- ड্ (ḍ) + ष (ṣa) gives the ligature ḍṣa:

- द্ (d) + ष (ṣa) gives the ligature dṣa:

- ङ্ (ŋ) + ष (ṣa) gives the ligature ŋṣa:

- ष্ (ṣ) + च (ca) gives the ligature ṣca:

- ष্ (ṣ) + ड (ḍa) gives the ligature ṣḍa:

- ष্ (ṣ) + ज (ja) gives the ligature ṣja:

- ष্ (ṣ) + ज্ (j) + ञ (ña) gives the ligature ṣjña:

- ष্ (ṣ) + ल (la) gives the ligature ṣla:

- ष্ (ṣ) + ङ (ŋa) gives the ligature ṣŋa:

- ष্ (ṣ) + ञ (ña) gives the ligature ṣña:

- ठ্ (ṭʰ) + ष (ṣa) gives the ligature ṭʰṣa:

- ट্ (ṭ) + ष (ṣa) gives the ligature ṭṣa:

== Bengali Ṣa ==
The Bengali script ষ is derived from the Siddhaṃ, and is marked by a similar horizontal head line, but less geometric shape, than its Devanagari counterpart, ष. The inherent vowel of Bengali consonant letters is /ɔ/, so the bare letter ষ will sometimes be transliterated as "ṣo" instead of "ṣa". Adding okar, the "o" vowel mark, gives a reading of /ʂo/. Like all Indic consonants, ষ can be modified by marks to indicate another (or no) vowel than its inherent "a".

Bengali ষ with vowel marks
ṣa	ṣā	ṣi	ṣī	ṣu	ṣū	ṣr	ṣr̄	ṣe	ṣai	ṣo	ṣau	ṣ
ষ	ষা	ষি	ষী	ষু	ষূ	ষৃ	ষৄ	ষে	ষৈ	ষো	ষৌ	ষ্

=== ষ in Bengali-using languages ===
ষ is used as a basic consonant character in all of the major Bengali script orthographies, including Bengali and Assamese.

=== Conjuncts with ষ ===
==== Conjuncts in Kssa ক্ষ ====
The most important conjunct of ষ is the irregular kṣa ligature ক্ + ষ [ṣ] = ক্ষ. This conjunct not only has a special form in all Bengali alphabets, it even functions as an independent letter in the Assamese orthography. This ক্ষ conjunct forms regular conjuncts with other letters, keeping its distinct form:

- ক্ষ (kṣ) + ম (ma) gives the ligature kṣma:

- ক্ষ (kṣ) + ম্ (m) + য (ya) gives the ligature kṣmya, with the ya phala suffix:

- ক্ষ (kṣ) + ন (na) gives the ligature kṣna:

- ক্ষ (kṣ) + ব (va) gives the ligature kṣva, with the va phala suffix:

- ক্ষ (kṣ) + য (ya) gives the ligature kṣya, with the ya phala suffix:

==== Other conjuncts with ষ ====
Bengali ষ exhibits conjunct ligatures, as is common in Indic scripts, with both stacked and linear (horizontal) ligatures being common.

- র্ (r) + ষ (ṣa) gives the ligature rṣa, with the repha prefix:

- র্ (r) + ষ্ (ṣ) + য (ya) gives the ligature rṣya, with repha and the ya phala suffix:

- ষ্ (ṣ) + ক (ka) gives the ligature ṣka:

- ষ্ (ṣ) + ক্ (k) + র (ra) gives the ligature ṣkra, with the ra phala suffix:

- ষ্ (ṣ) + ম (ma) gives the ligature ṣma:

- ষ্ (ṣ) + ঞ (ña) gives the ligature ṣña:

- ষ্ (ṣ) + প (pa) gives the ligature ṣpa:

- ষ্ (ṣ) + ফ (pʰa) gives the ligature ṣpʰa:

- ষ্ (ṣ) + প্ (p) + র (ra) gives the ligature ṣpra, with the ra phala suffix:

- ষ্ (ṣ) + ট (ṭa) gives the ligature ṣṭa:

- ষ্ (ṣ) + ঠ (ṭʰa) gives the ligature ṣṭʰa:

- ষ্ (ṣ) + ঠ্ (ṭʰ) + য (ya) gives the ligature ṣṭʰya, with the ya phala suffix:

- ষ্ (ṣ) + ট্ (ṭ) + র (ra) gives the ligature ṣṭra, with the ra phala suffix:

- ষ্ (ṣ) + ট্ (ṭ) + য (ya) gives the ligature ṣṭya, with the ya phala suffix:

- ষ্ (ṣ) + ব (va) gives the ligature ṣva, with the va phala suffix:

- ষ্ (ṣ) + য (ya) gives the ligature ṣya, with the ya phala suffix:

== Gujarati Ṣa ==
Gujarati Ṣa.

Ṣa (ષ) is the thirty-first consonant of the Gujarati abugida. It is derived from the Devanagari Ṣa with the top bar (shiro rekha) removed, and ultimately the Brahmi letter.

=== Gujarati-using Languages ===
The Gujarati script is used to write the Gujarati and Kutchi languages. In both languages, ષ is pronounced as [ʂə] or [ʂ] when appropriate. Like all Indic scripts, Gujarati uses vowel marks attached to the base consonant to override the inherent /ə/ vowel:

Ṣa	Ṣā	Ṣi	Ṣī	Ṣu	Ṣū	Ṣr	Ṣl	Ṣr̄	Ṣl̄	Ṣĕ	Ṣe	Ṣai	Ṣŏ	Ṣo	Ṣau	Ṣ
Gujarati Ṣa syllables, with vowel marks in red.

=== Conjuncts with ષ ===
Half form of Ṣa.

Gujarati ષ exhibits conjunct ligatures, much like its parent Devanagari Script. Most Gujarati conjuncts can only be formed by reducing the letter shape to fit tightly to the following letter, usually by dropping a character's vertical stem, sometimes referred to as a "half form". A few conjunct clusters can be represented by a true ligature, instead of a shape that can be broken into constituent independent letters, and vertically stacked conjuncts can also be found in Gujarati, although much less commonly than in Devanagari. True ligatures are quite rare in Indic scripts. The most common ligated conjuncts in Gujarati are in the form of a slight mutation to fit in context or as a consistent variant form appended to the adjacent characters. Those variants include Na and the Repha and Rakar forms of Ra.

- ર્ (r) + ષ (ʂa) gives the ligature RṢa:

- ષ્ (ʂ) + ર (ra) gives the ligature ṢRa:

- ક્ (k) + ષ (ʂa) gives the ligature KṢa:

- ર્ (r) + ક (ka) ષ (ʂa) gives the ligature RKṢa:

- ક્ (k) + ષ (ʂa) ર (ra) gives the ligature KṢRa:

- ઙ્ (ŋ) + ક (ka) ષ (ʂa) gives the ligature ṄKṢa:

- ષ્ (ʂ) + ત (ta) gives the ligature ṢTa:

- ષ્ (ʂ) + ઠ (ʈʰa) gives the ligature ṢṬha:

== Telugu Ṣa ==
Telugu independent and subjoined Ṣa.

Ṣa (ష) is a consonant of the Telugu abugida. It ultimately arose from the Brahmi letter. It is closely related to the Kannada letter ಷ. Most Telugu consonants contain a v-shaped headstroke that is related to the horizontal headline found in other Indic scripts, although headstrokes do not connect adjacent letters in Telugu. The headstroke is normally lost when adding vowel matras.

Telugu independent and subjoined KṢa.

Telugu conjuncts are created by reducing trailing letters to a subjoined form that appears below the initial consonant of the conjunct. Many subjoined forms are created by dropping their headline, with many extending the end of the stroke of the main letter body to form an extended tail reaching up to the right of the preceding consonant. This subjoining of trailing letters to create conjuncts is in contrast to the leading half forms of Devanagari and Bengali letters. Ligature conjuncts are not a feature in Telugu, with the only non-standard construction being an alternate subjoined form of Ṣa (borrowed from Kannada) in the KṢa conjunct.

== Malayalam Ṣa ==
Malayalam letter Ṣa

Ṣa (ഷ) is a consonant of the Malayalam abugida. It ultimately arose from the Brahmi letter, via the Grantha letter Ssa. Like in other Indic scripts, Malayalam consonants have the inherent vowel "a", and take one of several modifying vowel signs to represent syllables with another vowel or no vowel at all.

Malayalam Ssa matras: Ssa, Ssā, Ssi, Ssī, Ssu, Ssū, Ssr̥, Ssr̥̄, Ssl̥, Ssl̥̄, Sse, Ssē, Ssai, Sso, Ssō, Ssau, and Ss.

=== Conjuncts of ഷ ===
As is common in Indic scripts, Malayalam joins letters together to form conjunct consonant clusters. There are several ways in which conjuncts are formed in Malayalam texts: using a post-base form of a trailing consonant placed under the initial consonant of a conjunct, a combined ligature of two or more consonants joined together, a conjoining form that appears as a combining mark on the rest of the conjunct, the use of an explicit candrakkala mark to suppress the inherent "a" vowel, or a special consonant form called a "chillu" letter, representing a bare consonant without the inherent "a" vowel. Texts written with the modern reformed Malayalam orthography, put̪iya lipi, may favor more regular conjunct forms than older texts in paḻaya lipi, due to changes undertaken in the 1970s by the Government of Kerala.

- ഷ് (ṣ) + ട (ṭa) gives the ligature ṣṭa:

- ഷ് (ṣ) + ഠ (ṭʰa) gives the ligature ṣṭʰa:

- ഷ് (ṣ) + ണ (ṇa) gives the ligature ṣṇa:

- ഷ് (ṣ) + പ (pa) gives the ligature ṣpa:

- ഷ് (ṣ) + മ (ma) gives the ligature ṣma:

- ക് (k) + ഷ (ṣa) gives the ligature kṣa:

- ക് (k) + ഷ് (ṣ) + ണ (ṇa) gives the ligature kṣṇa:

- ക് (k) + ഷ് (ṣ) + മ (ma) gives the ligature kṣma:

- ക് (k) + ഷ് (ṣ) + ല (la) gives the ligature kṣla:

== Odia Ṣa ==
Odia independent and subjoined letter Ṣa.

Ṣa (ଷ) is a consonant of the Odia abugida. It ultimately arose from the Brahmi letter, via the Siddhaṃ letter Ssa. Like in other Indic scripts, Odia consonants have the inherent vowel "a", and take one of several modifying vowel signs to represent syllables with another vowel or no vowel at all.

Odia Ssa with vowel matras
Ṣa	Ṣā	Ṣi	Ṣī	Ṣu	Ṣū	Ṣr̥	Ṣr̥̄	Ṣl̥	Ṣl̥̄	Ṣe	Ṣai	Ṣo	Ṣau	Ṣ
ଷ	ଷା	ଷି	ଷୀ	ଷୁ	ଷୂ	ଷୃ	ଷୄ	ଷୢ	ଷୣ	ଷେ	ଷୈ	ଷୋ	ଷୌ	ଷ୍

=== Conjuncts of ଷ ===
As is common in Indic scripts, Odia joins letters together to form conjunct consonant clusters. The most common conjunct formation is achieved by using a small subjoined form of trailing consonants. Most consonants' subjoined forms are identical to the full form, just reduced in size, although a few drop the curved headline or have a subjoined form not directly related to the full form of the consonant. The second type of conjunct formation is through pure ligatures, where the constituent consonants are written together in a single graphic form. Except for କ୍ଷ (Kṣa), ଷ generates conjuncts only by subjoining and does not form ligatures.

==== Odia Kṣa କ୍ଷ ====
Odia independent and subjoined KSsa.

Although ostensibly a conjunct of Ka and Ssa, Odia କ୍ଷ (Kṣa) is largely treated as an independent letter pronounced /kʰjɔ/. Unlike other Odia conjuncts, କ୍ଷ can be found as an independent letter subjoined to another letter or conjunct.

- ତ୍ (t) + କ୍ (k) + ଷ (ṣa) gives the ligature tkṣa:

== Kaithi Ṣa ==
Kaithi consonant and half-form Ṣa.

Ṣa (𑂭) is a consonant of the Kaithi abugida. It ultimately arose from the Brahmi letter, via the Siddhaṃ letter Ssa. Like in other Indic scripts, Kaithi consonants have the inherent vowel "a", and take one of several modifying vowel signs to represent syllables with another vowel or no vowel at all.

Kaithi Ssa with vowel matras
Ssa	Ssā	Ssi	Ssī	Ssu	Ssū	Sse	Ssai	Sso	Ssau	Ss
𑂭	𑂭𑂰	𑂭𑂱	𑂭𑂲	𑂭𑂳	𑂭𑂴	𑂭𑂵	𑂭𑂶	𑂭𑂷	𑂭𑂸	𑂭𑂹

=== Conjuncts of 𑂭 ===
As is common in Indic scripts, Kaithi joins letters together to form conjunct consonant clusters. The most common conjunct formation is achieved by using a half form of preceding consonants, although several consonants use an explicit virama. Most half forms are derived from the full form by removing the vertical stem. As is common in most Indic scripts, conjuncts of ra are indicated with a repha or rakar mark attached to the rest of the consonant cluster. In addition, there are a few vertical conjuncts that can be found in Kaithi writing, but true ligatures are not used in the modern Kaithi script.

- 𑂭୍ (ṣ) + 𑂩 (ra) gives the ligature ṣra:

- 𑂩୍ (r) + 𑂭 (ṣa) gives the ligature rṣa:

== Tirhuta Ṣa ==
Tirhuta consonant Ṣa

Ṣa (𑒭) is a consonant of the Tirhuta abugida. It ultimately arose from the Brahmi letter, via the Siddhaṃ letter Ssa. Like in other Indic scripts, Tirhuta consonants have the inherent vowel "a", and take one of several modifying vowel signs to represent sylables with another vowel or no vowel at all.

Tirhuta Ṣa with vowel matras
Ṣa	Ṣā	Ṣi	Ṣī	Ṣu	Ṣū	Ṣṛ	Ṣṝ	Ṣḷ	Ṣḹ	Ṣē	Ṣe	Ṣai	Ṣō	Ṣo	Ṣau	Ṣ
𑒭	𑒭𑒰	𑒭𑒱	𑒭𑒲	𑒭𑒳	𑒭𑒴	𑒭𑒵	𑒭𑒶	𑒭𑒷	𑒭𑒸	𑒭𑒹	𑒭𑒺	𑒭𑒻	𑒭𑒼	𑒭𑒽	𑒭𑒾	𑒭𑓂

=== Conjuncts of 𑒭 ===
As is common in Indic scripts, Tirhuta joins letters together to form conjunct consonant clusters. The most common conjunct formation is achieved by using an explicit virama. As is common in most Indic scripts, conjuncts of ra are indicated with a repha or rakar mark attached to the rest of the consonant cluster. In addition, other consonants take unique combining forms when in conjunct with other letters, and there are several vertical conjuncts and true ligatures that can be found in Tirhuta writing.

- 𑒏୍ (k) + 𑒭 (ṣa) gives the ligature kṣa:

- 𑒩୍ (r) + 𑒏୍ (k) + 𑒭 (ṣa) gives the ligature rkṣa:

- 𑒩୍ (r) + 𑒭 (ṣa) gives the ligature rṣa:

- 𑒭୍ (ṣ) + 𑒏 (ka) gives the ligature ṣka:

- 𑒭୍ (ṣ) + 𑒝 (ṇa) gives the ligature ṣṇa:

- 𑒭୍ (ṣ) + 𑒩 (ra) gives the ligature ṣra:

- 𑒭୍ (ṣ) + 𑒙 (ṭa) gives the ligature ṣṭa:

- 𑒭୍ (ṣ) + 𑒚 (ṭʰa) gives the ligature ṣṭʰa:

- 𑒭 (ṣ) + 𑒅 (u) gives the ligature ṣu:

- 𑒭୍ (ṣ) + 𑒫 (va) gives the ligature ṣva:

- 𑒞୍ (t) + 𑒏 (ka) gives the ligature tka:

- 𑒞୍ (t) + 𑒭 (ṣa) gives the ligature tṣa:

== Comparison of Ṣa ==
The various Indic scripts are generally related to each other through adaptation and borrowing, and as such the glyphs for cognate letters, including Ṣa, are related as well.

Comparison of Ṣa in different scripts

Aramaic
Kharoṣṭhī 𐨮	Ashoka Brahmi	Kushana Brahmi (Note: The middle "Kushana" form of Brahmi is a later style that emerged as Brahmi scripts were beginning to proliferate. Gupta Brahmi was definitely a stylistic descendant from Kushana, but other Brahmi-derived scripts may have descended from earlier forms.)	Tocharian (Note: Tocharian is probably derived from the middle period "Kushana" form of Brahmi, although artifacts from that time are not plentiful enough to establish a definite succession.) /
Gupta Brahmi	Pallava
Kadamba -
Bhaiksuki 𑰬	Siddhaṃ	Grantha 𑌷	Cham ꨦ
Sinhala ෂ	Pyu / Old Mon (Note: Pyu and Old Mon are probably the precursors of the Burmese script, and may be derived from either the Pallava or Kadamba script) -
Tibetan ཥ	Newa 𑐲	Ahom -	Malayalam ഷ
Telugu ష	Burmese ၑ
Lepcha -	Ranjana	Saurashtra ꢰ	Dives Akuru 𑤫
Kannada ಷ	Kayah Li -
Limbu ᤚ	Soyombo (Note: May also be derived from Devangari (see bottom left of table)) 𑪀	Khmer ឞ	Tamil ஷ
Chakma -	Tai Tham ᩇ
Meitei Mayek ꫪ	Gaudi -	Thai ษ	Lao ຩ
Tai Le -
Marchen -	Tirhuta 𑒭	New Tai Lue -	Tai Viet -	Aksara Kawi
'Phags-pa -	Odia ଷ	Sharada 𑆰	Rejang -	Batak -	Buginese -
Zanabazar Square 𑨯	Bengali–Assamese	Takri -	Javanese ꦰ	Balinese ᬱ	Makasar -
Hangul (Note: The Origin of Hangul from 'Phags-pa is one of limited influence, inspiring at most a few basic letter shapes. Hangul does not function as an Indic abugida.) -	Northern Nagari -	Dogri 𑠨	Laṇḍā -	Sundanese -	Baybayin -
Modi 𑘬	Gujarati ષ	Khojki -	Khudabadi -	Mahajani -	Tagbanwa -
Devanagari	Nandinagari 𑧌	Kaithi	Gurmukhi -	Multani -	Buhid -
Canadian Syllabics (Note: Although the basic letter forms of the Canadian Aboriginal Syllabics were derived from handwritten Devanagari letters, this abugida indicates vowel sounds by rotations of the letter form, rather than the use of vowel diacritics as is standard in Indic abugidas.) -	Soyombo (Note: May also be derived from Ranjana (see above)) 𑪀	Sylheti Nagari -	Gunjala Gondi -	Masaram Gondi (Note: Masaram Gondi acts as an Indic abugida, but its letterforms were not derived from any single precursor script.) 𑴪	Hanuno'o -

== Character encodings of Ṣa ==
Most Indic scripts are encoded in the Unicode Standard, and as such the letter Ṣa in those scripts can be represented in plain text with unique codepoint. Ṣa from several modern-use scripts can also be found in legacy encodings, such as ISCII.

Character information
Preview					ஷ		ష		ଷ		ಷ		ഷ		ષ	
Unicode name	DEVANAGARI LETTER SSA		BENGALI LETTER SSA		TAMIL LETTER SSA		TELUGU LETTER SSA		ORIYA LETTER SSA		KANNADA LETTER SSA		MALAYALAM LETTER SSA		GUJARATI LETTER SSA	
Encodings	decimal	hex	dec	hex	dec	hex	dec	hex	dec	hex	dec	hex	dec	hex	dec	hex
Unicode	2359	U+0937	2487	U+09B7	2999	U+0BB7	3127	U+0C37	2871	U+0B37	3255	U+0CB7	3383	U+0D37	2743	U+0AB7
UTF-8	224 164 183	E0 A4 B7	224 166 183	E0 A6 B7	224 174 183	E0 AE B7	224 176 183	E0 B0 B7	224 172 183	E0 AC B7	224 178 183	E0 B2 B7	224 180 183	E0 B4 B7	224 170 183	E0 AA B7
Numeric character reference	&#2359;	&#x937;	&#2487;	&#x9B7;	&#2999;	&#xBB7;	&#3127;	&#xC37;	&#2871;	&#xB37;	&#3255;	&#xCB7;	&#3383;	&#xD37;	&#2743;	&#xAB7;
ISCII	214	D6	214	D6	214	D6	214	D6	214	D6	214	D6	214	D6	214	D6

Character information
Preview	Ashoka Kushana Gupta		𐨮				𑌷	
Unicode name	BRAHMI LETTER SSA		KHAROSHTHI LETTER SSA		SIDDHAM LETTER SSA		GRANTHA LETTER SSA	
Encodings	decimal	hex	dec	hex	dec	hex	dec	hex
Unicode	69681	U+11031	68142	U+10A2E	71084	U+115AC	70455	U+11337
UTF-8	240 145 128 177	F0 91 80 B1	240 144 168 174	F0 90 A8 AE	240 145 150 172	F0 91 96 AC	240 145 140 183	F0 91 8C B7
UTF-16	55300 56369	D804 DC31	55298 56878	D802 DE2E	55301 56748	D805 DDAC	55300 57143	D804 DF37
Numeric character reference	&#69681;	&#x11031;	&#68142;	&#x10A2E;	&#71084;	&#x115AC;	&#70455;	&#x11337;

Character information
Preview	ཥ		ྵ		𑨯		𑐲		𑰬		𑆰	
Unicode name	TIBETAN LETTER SSA		TIBETAN SUBJOINED LETTER SSA		ZANABAZAR SQUARE LETTER SSA		NEWA LETTER SSA		BHAIKSUKI LETTER SSA		SHARADA LETTER SSA	
Encodings	decimal	hex	dec	hex	dec	hex	dec	hex	dec	hex	dec	hex
Unicode	3941	U+0F65	4021	U+0FB5	72239	U+11A2F	70706	U+11432	72748	U+11C2C	70064	U+111B0
UTF-8	224 189 165	E0 BD A5	224 190 181	E0 BE B5	240 145 168 175	F0 91 A8 AF	240 145 144 178	F0 91 90 B2	240 145 176 172	F0 91 B0 AC	240 145 134 176	F0 91 86 B0
UTF-16	3941	0F65	4021	0FB5	55302 56879	D806 DE2F	55301 56370	D805 DC32	55303 56364	D807 DC2C	55300 56752	D804 DDB0
Numeric character reference	&#3941;	&#xF65;	&#4021;	&#xFB5;	&#72239;	&#x11A2F;	&#70706;	&#x11432;	&#72748;	&#x11C2C;	&#70064;	&#x111B0;

Character information
Preview	ၑ		ᩇ	
Unicode name	MYANMAR LETTER SSA		TAI THAM LETTER HIGH SSA	
Encodings	decimal	hex	dec	hex
Unicode	4177	U+1051	6727	U+1A47
UTF-8	225 129 145	E1 81 91	225 169 135	E1 A9 87
Numeric character reference	&#4177;	&#x1051;	&#6727;	&#x1A47;

Character information
Preview	ឞ		ຩ		ษ	
Unicode name	KHMER LETTER SSO		LAO LETTER SANSKRIT SSA		THAI CHARACTER SO RUSI	
Encodings	decimal	hex	dec	hex	dec	hex
Unicode	6046	U+179E	3753	U+0EA9	3625	U+0E29
UTF-8	225 158 158	E1 9E 9E	224 186 169	E0 BA A9	224 184 169	E0 B8 A9
Numeric character reference	&#6046;	&#x179E;	&#3753;	&#xEA9;	&#3625;	&#xE29;

Character information
Preview	ෂ		𑤫		ꢰ		ꨦ	
Unicode name	SINHALA LETTER MUURDHAJA SAYANNA		DIVES AKURU LETTER SSA		SAURASHTRA LETTER SSA		CHAM LETTER SSA	
Encodings	decimal	hex	dec	hex	dec	hex	dec	hex
Unicode	3522	U+0DC2	71979	U+1192B	43184	U+A8B0	43558	U+AA26
UTF-8	224 183 130	E0 B7 82	240 145 164 171	F0 91 A4 AB	234 162 176	EA A2 B0	234 168 166	EA A8 A6
UTF-16	3522	0DC2	55302 56619	D806 DD2B	43184	A8B0	43558	AA26
Numeric character reference	&#3522;	&#xDC2;	&#71979;	&#x1192B;	&#43184;	&#xA8B0;	&#43558;	&#xAA26;

Character information
Preview	𑘬		𑧌		𑪀			
Unicode name	MODI LETTER SSA		NANDINAGARI LETTER SSA		SOYOMBO LETTER SSA		KAITHI LETTER SSA	
Encodings	decimal	hex	dec	hex	dec	hex	dec	hex
Unicode	71212	U+1162C	72140	U+119CC	72320	U+11A80	69805	U+110AD
UTF-8	240 145 152 172	F0 91 98 AC	240 145 167 140	F0 91 A7 8C	240 145 170 128	F0 91 AA 80	240 145 130 173	F0 91 82 AD
UTF-16	55301 56876	D805 DE2C	55302 56780	D806 DDCC	55302 56960	D806 DE80	55300 56493	D804 DCAD
Numeric character reference	&#71212;	&#x1162C;	&#72140;	&#x119CC;	&#72320;	&#x11A80;	&#69805;	&#x110AD;

Character information
Preview	𑒭		ᤚ		ꫪ	
Unicode name	TIRHUTA LETTER SSA		LIMBU LETTER SSA		MEETEI MAYEK LETTER SSA	
Encodings	decimal	hex	dec	hex	dec	hex
Unicode	70829	U+114AD	6426	U+191A	43754	U+AAEA
UTF-8	240 145 146 173	F0 91 92 AD	225 164 154	E1 A4 9A	234 171 170	EA AB AA
UTF-16	55301 56493	D805 DCAD	6426	191A	43754	AAEA
Numeric character reference	&#70829;	&#x114AD;	&#6426;	&#x191A;	&#43754;	&#xAAEA;

Character information
Preview	𑠨	
Unicode name	DOGRA LETTER SSA	
Encodings	decimal	hex
Unicode	71720	U+11828
UTF-8	240 145 160 168	F0 91 A0 A8
UTF-16	55302 56360	D806 DC28
Numeric character reference	&#71720;	&#x11828;

Character information
Preview	ᬱ		ꦰ	
Unicode name	BALINESE LETTER SA SAPA		JAVANESE LETTER SA MAHAPRANA	
Encodings	decimal	hex	dec	hex
Unicode	6961	U+1B31	43440	U+A9B0
UTF-8	225 172 177	E1 AC B1	234 166 176	EA A6 B0
Numeric character reference	&#6961;	&#x1B31;	&#43440;	&#xA9B0;

Character information
Preview	𑴪	
Unicode name	MASARAM GONDI LETTER SSA	
Encodings	decimal	hex
Unicode	73002	U+11D2A
UTF-8	240 145 180 170	F0 91 B4 AA
UTF-16	55303 56618	D807 DD2A
Numeric character reference	&#73002;	&#x11D2A;
