= Masaram Gondi (Unicode block) =

- Range: U+11D00..U+11D5F (96 code points)
- Plane: SMP
- Scripts: Masaram Gondi
- Assigned: 75 code points
- Unused: 21 reserved code points

Unicode Version History
- 10.0 (2017): 75 (+75)

Unicode documentation
- Code chart ∣ Web page

Masaram Gondi is a Unicode block containing characters from the Masaram Gondi script, which was designed for writing Gondi in 1918 by Munshi Mangal Singh Masaram, a Gond from the Balaghat district of Madhya Pradesh, India.

== Block ==
Masaram Gondi^{[1]}^{[2]} Official Unicode Consortium code chart (PDF)
	0	1	2	3	4	5	6	7	8	9	A	B	C	D	E	F
U+11D0x	𑴀	𑴁	𑴂	𑴃	𑴄	𑴅	𑴆		𑴈	𑴉		𑴋	𑴌	𑴍	𑴎	𑴏
U+11D1x	𑴐	𑴑	𑴒	𑴓	𑴔	𑴕	𑴖	𑴗	𑴘	𑴙	𑴚	𑴛	𑴜	𑴝	𑴞	𑴟
U+11D2x	𑴠	𑴡	𑴢	𑴣	𑴤	𑴥	𑴦	𑴧	𑴨	𑴩	𑴪	𑴫	𑴬	𑴭	𑴮	𑴯
U+11D3x	𑴰	𑴱	𑴲	𑴳	𑴴	𑴵	𑴶				𑴺		𑴼	𑴽		𑴿
U+11D4x	𑵀	𑵁	𑵂	𑵃	𑵄	𑵅	𑵆	𑵇								
U+11D5x	𑵐	𑵑	𑵒	𑵓	𑵔	𑵕	𑵖	𑵗	𑵘	𑵙						
Notes 1.As of Unicode version 17.0 2.Grey areas indicate non-assigned code points

== History ==
The following Unicode-related documents record the purpose and process of defining specific characters in the Masaram Gondi block:

Version	Final code points (Note: Proposed code points and characters names may differ from final code points and names)	Count	L2 ID	WG2 ID	Document
10.0	U+11D00..11D06, 11D08..11D09, 11D0B..11D36, 11D3A, 11D3C..11D3D, 11D3F..11D47, 11D50..11D59	75	L2/10-207	N3841	Pandey, Anshuman (2010-05-20), Preliminary Proposal to Encode the Gondi Script
10.0	U+11D00..11D06, 11D08..11D09, 11D0B..11D36, 11D3A, 11D3C..11D3D, 11D3F..11D47, 11D50..11D59	75	L2/12-267		Anderson, Deborah; McGowan, Rick; Whistler, Ken (2012-07-21), "VIII. GONDI", Review of Indic-related documents and Recommendations to the UTC
10.0	U+11D00..11D06, 11D08..11D09, 11D0B..11D36, 11D3A, 11D3C..11D3D, 11D3F..11D47, 11D50..11D59	75	L2/12-235	N4291	Pandey, Anshuman (2012-07-23), Revised Preliminary Proposal to Encode the Gondi Script
10.0	U+11D00..11D06, 11D08..11D09, 11D0B..11D36, 11D3A, 11D3C..11D3D, 11D3F..11D47, 11D50..11D59	75	L2/13-028		Anderson, Deborah; McGowan, Rick; Whistler, Ken; Pournader, Roozbeh (2013-01-28), "26", Recommendations to UTC on Script Proposals
10.0	U+11D00..11D06, 11D08..11D09, 11D0B..11D36, 11D3A, 11D3C..11D3D, 11D3F..11D47, 11D50..11D59	75	L2/15-005		Pandey, Anshuman (2015-01-27), Proposal to Encode the Gondi Script
10.0	U+11D00..11D06, 11D08..11D09, 11D0B..11D36, 11D3A, 11D3C..11D3D, 11D3F..11D47, 11D50..11D59	75	L2/15-045		Anderson, Deborah; Whistler, Ken; McGowan, Rick; Pournader, Roozbeh; Glass, Andrew (2015-01-30), "5. Gondi", Recommendations to UTC #142 February 2015 on Script Proposals
10.0	U+11D00..11D06, 11D08..11D09, 11D0B..11D36, 11D3A, 11D3C..11D3D, 11D3F..11D47, 11D50..11D59	75	L2/15-090R		Pandey, Anshuman (2015-06-02), Proposal to Encode the Masaram Gondi Script
10.0	U+11D00..11D06, 11D08..11D09, 11D0B..11D36, 11D3A, 11D3C..11D3D, 11D3F..11D47, 11D50..11D59	75	L2/15-112		Ganesan, Naga (2015-04-15), GONDI and GUNJALA GONDI CHARACTER NAMES – Vowels EE and OO
10.0	U+11D00..11D06, 11D08..11D09, 11D0B..11D36, 11D3A, 11D3C..11D3D, 11D3F..11D47, 11D50..11D59	75	L2/15-149		Anderson, Deborah; Whistler, Ken; McGowan, Rick; Pournader, Roozbeh; Pandey, Anshuman; Glass, Andrew (2015-05-03), "2. Gondi", Recommendations to UTC #143 May 2015 on Script Proposals
10.0	U+11D00..11D06, 11D08..11D09, 11D0B..11D36, 11D3A, 11D3C..11D3D, 11D3F..11D47, 11D50..11D59	75	L2/15-107		Moore, Lisa (2015-05-12), "D.8.2", UTC #143 Minutes
