= Gunjala Gondi script =

Abugida used to write Gondi

Gunjala Gondi Lipi 𑵶𑶍𑶕𑶀𑵵𑶊 𑵶𑶓𑶕𑶂𑶋 𑵵𑶋𑶅𑶋
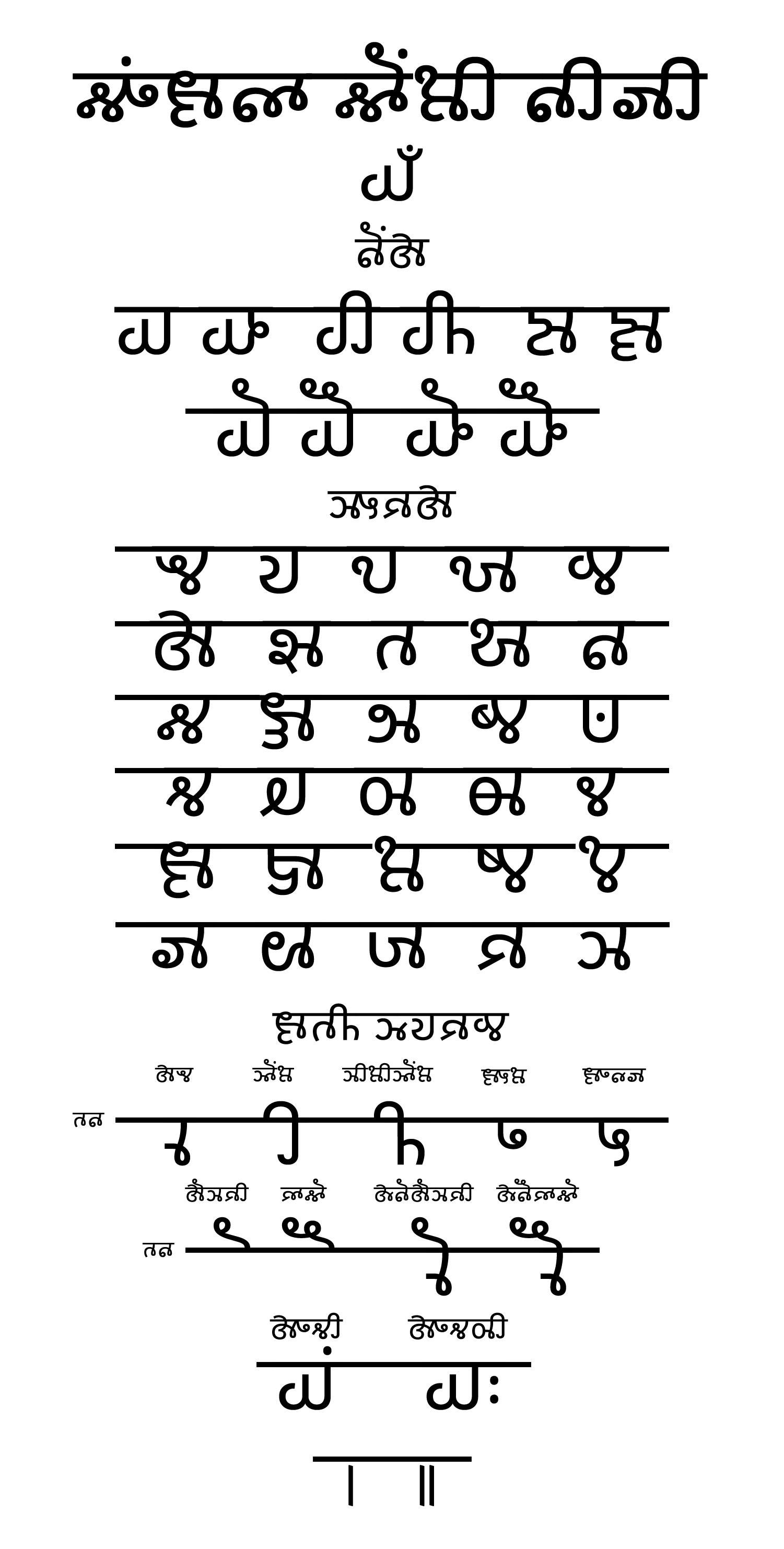
- Gunjala Gondi Aksharamala (Alphabet Chart) divided into 10 Vowels (𑵵𑶐𑶕𑵱), 30 Basic consonants (𑶉𑶎𑶈𑵱), 9 Vowel diacritics (𑶀𑵳𑶌 𑶉𑶗𑵭𑶈𑵰), 2 Special diacritic marks and 2 punctuation signs, with a sacred invocation sign (𑶘) at the very top.
- Script type: Abugida
- Period: c. 1750-Present
- Direction: Left-to-right
- Languages: Gondi

Related scripts
- Parent systems: Egyptian hieroglyphs: Proto-Sinaitic; Phoenician; Aramaic script; Brahmi; Gupta; Siddhaṃ; Nāgarī; Gunjala Gondi Lipi
- Sister systems: Unknown, strong resemblance with Modi

ISO 15924
- ISO 15924: Gong (312), Gunjala Gondi

Unicode
- Unicode alias: Gunjala Gondi
- Unicode range: U+11D60–U+11DAF

The Gunjala Gondi lipi (Southern Gondi: 𑵶𑶍𑶕𑶀𑵵𑶊 𑵶𑶓𑶕𑶂𑶋 𑵵𑶋𑶅𑶋) or Koytura Gunjala Lipi (Southern Gondi: 𑵱𑶓𑵣𑵳𑶓𑶈 𑵶𑶍𑶕𑶀𑵵𑶊 𑵵𑶋𑶅𑶋), is a script used to write the Southern Gondi language, a Dravidian language spoken by the Gond people of northern Telangana, eastern Maharashtra, southeastern Madhya Pradesh, and Chhattisgarh. Approximately a dozen manuscripts in the script were recovered from Gunjala, a Gond village in Adilabad district of Telangana, by a team of researchers from the University of Hyderabad, led by Professor Jayadheer Tirumala Rao. The script and preliminary font were unveiled in early 2014.

== History of manuscripts ==
The manuscripts have been dated to approximately 1750, based on knowledge from Gondi pundits and researchers at the Center of Dalit and Adivasi Studies and Translation (CDAST). The information contained in the manuscripts includes that of the names of the months and days, a horoscope chart, grammar, and numbers. Additionally, manuscripts were found on "knowledge of the seasons, history, and the Gondi code of ethics and literature." Of the historical information that has been discovered, the following cases have been reported: the 6th-7th century trade relationship between the Pardhan community and civilizations in Myanmar; the origins of the Indravelli mandal; the early eighteenth century rebellions of the Chandrapur Gond kings against the British, with the support of the Rohilla community, among other pieces of information.

=== Response to discovery, education, and spread ===
"Gunjala Gondi Lipi" written in Gunjala Gondi script

The script has seen a very welcoming response by the various government agencies in Andhra Pradesh, at the national level, and local agencies in the region. The existence of the manuscripts has allegedly been known for 5–9 years, but were not prioritized until 2013, when Prof. Jayadheer Tirumala Rao discovered that only four elders in the village were still able to read the script. Currently, approximately eighty students are able to read the script, with students devising stories and elder Kotnak Jangu writing an autobiography. Plans are in place for the expansion of the script to fifteen other government schools in villages with a high Gond population. A reader for the script in Telugu was released for Standard I students. Efforts are being undertaken to get the script into the Unicode standard. In 2015, a Unicode proposal was written by Anshuman Pandey from the Department of Linguistics at the University of California, Berkeley. The proposal was approved by the Unicode Technical Committee in November 2015.

== Characters ==
The characters themselves, while bearing resemblance to similar phonemes found in other Indian scripts, are in a different, "native" order, as the script starts with the letter "ya" instead of the traditional "ka" for other Indian scripts. The script includes 12 vowels and 30 consonants. Consonants not included are ṅa, ña, śa and ṣa.

Consonants
𑵬 ya	𑵭 va	𑵮 ba	𑵯 bha	𑵰 ma
𑵱 ka	𑵲 kha	𑵳 ta	𑵴 tha	𑵵 la
𑵶 ga	𑵷 gha	𑵸 da	𑵹 dha	𑵺 na
𑵻 ca	𑵼 cha	𑵽 ṭa	𑵾 ṭha	𑵿 ḷa
𑶀 ja	𑶁 jha	𑶂 ḍa	𑶃 ḍha	𑶄 ṅa
𑶅 pa	𑶆 pha	𑶇 ha	𑶈 ra	𑶉 sa

Vowels
Vowel	a	ā	i	ī	u	ū
Independent	𑵠	𑵡	𑵢	𑵣	𑵤	𑵥
Dependent		𑶊	𑶋	𑶌	𑶍	𑶎

Vowel	e	ai	o	au	aṃ	aḥ
Independent	𑵧	𑵨	𑵪	𑵫	𑵠𑶕	𑵠𑶖
Dependent	𑶐	𑶑	𑶓	𑶔	𑶕	𑶖

Signs
𑶗 virama	𑶘 om

Digits
𑶠 0	𑶡 1	𑶢 2	𑶣 3	𑶤 4	𑶥 5	𑶦 6	𑶧 7	𑶨 8	𑶩 9

== Unicode ==
The Gunjala Gondi script was added to the Unicode Standard in June, 2018 with the release of version 11.0.

The Unicode block for Gunjala Gondi is U+11D60–U+11DAF and it contains 63 characters:

Gunjala Gondi^{[1]}^{[2]} Official Unicode Consortium code chart (PDF)
	0	1	2	3	4	5	6	7	8	9	A	B	C	D	E	F
U+11D6x	𑵠	𑵡	𑵢	𑵣	𑵤	𑵥		𑵧	𑵨		𑵪	𑵫	𑵬	𑵭	𑵮	𑵯
U+11D7x	𑵰	𑵱	𑵲	𑵳	𑵴	𑵵	𑵶	𑵷	𑵸	𑵹	𑵺	𑵻	𑵼	𑵽	𑵾	𑵿
U+11D8x	𑶀	𑶁	𑶂	𑶃	𑶄	𑶅	𑶆	𑶇	𑶈	𑶉	𑶊	𑶋	𑶌	𑶍	𑶎	
U+11D9x	𑶐	𑶑		𑶓	𑶔	𑶕	𑶖	𑶗	𑶘							
U+11DAx	𑶠	𑶡	𑶢	𑶣	𑶤	𑶥	𑶦	𑶧	𑶨	𑶩						
Notes 1.As of Unicode version 17.0 2.Grey areas indicate non-assigned code points

== See also ==
- Gondi script
- Gondi language
- Gond people
