= Gunjala Gondi (Unicode block) =

- Range: U+11D60..U+11DAF (80 code points)
- Plane: SMP
- Scripts: Gunjala Gondi
- Assigned: 63 code points
- Unused: 17 reserved code points

Unicode version history
- 11.0 (2018): 63 (+63)

Unicode documentation
- Code chart ∣ Web page

Gunjala Gondi is a Unicode block containing characters of Gunjala Gondi script used for writing the Adilabad dialect of the Gondi language.

== Block ==
Gunjala Gondi^{[1]}^{[2]} Official Unicode Consortium code chart (PDF)
	0	1	2	3	4	5	6	7	8	9	A	B	C	D	E	F
U+11D6x	𑵠	𑵡	𑵢	𑵣	𑵤	𑵥		𑵧	𑵨		𑵪	𑵫	𑵬	𑵭	𑵮	𑵯
U+11D7x	𑵰	𑵱	𑵲	𑵳	𑵴	𑵵	𑵶	𑵷	𑵸	𑵹	𑵺	𑵻	𑵼	𑵽	𑵾	𑵿
U+11D8x	𑶀	𑶁	𑶂	𑶃	𑶄	𑶅	𑶆	𑶇	𑶈	𑶉	𑶊	𑶋	𑶌	𑶍	𑶎	
U+11D9x	𑶐	𑶑		𑶓	𑶔	𑶕	𑶖	𑶗	𑶘							
U+11DAx	𑶠	𑶡	𑶢	𑶣	𑶤	𑶥	𑶦	𑶧	𑶨	𑶩						
Notes: 1. As of Unicode version 16.0; 2. Grey areas indicate non-assigned code points

== History ==
The following Unicode-related documents record the purpose and process of defining specific characters in the Gunjala Gondi block:

Version	Final code points (Note: Proposed code points and characters names may differ from final code points and names)	Count	L2 ID	Document
11.0	U+11D60..11D65, 11D67..11D68, 11D6A..11D8E, 11D90..11D91, 11D93..11D98, 11DA0..11DA9	63	L2/15-086	Pandey, Anshuman (2015-02-20), Preliminary Proposal to Encode the Gunjala Gondi Script
11.0	U+11D60..11D65, 11D67..11D68, 11D6A..11D8E, 11D90..11D91, 11D93..11D98, 11DA0..11DA9	63	L2/15-112	Ganesan, Naga (2015-04-15), GONDI and GUNJALA GONDI CHARACTER NAMES – Vowels EE and OO
11.0	U+11D60..11D65, 11D67..11D68, 11D6A..11D8E, 11D90..11D91, 11D93..11D98, 11DA0..11DA9	63	L2/15-149	Anderson, Deborah; Whistler, Ken; McGowan, Rick; Pournader, Roozbeh; Pandey, Anshuman; Glass, Andrew (2015-05-03), "2. Gondi", Recommendations to UTC #143 May 2015 on Script Proposals
11.0	U+11D60..11D65, 11D67..11D68, 11D6A..11D8E, 11D90..11D91, 11D93..11D98, 11DA0..11DA9	63	L2/15-312	Anderson, Deborah; Whistler, Ken; McGowan, Rick; Pournader, Roozbeh; Glass, Andrew; Iancu, Laurențiu (2015-11-01), "2. Gunjala Gondi", Recommendations to UTC #145 November 2015 on Script Proposals
11.0	U+11D60..11D65, 11D67..11D68, 11D6A..11D8E, 11D90..11D91, 11D93..11D98, 11DA0..11DA9	63	L2/15-254	Moore, Lisa (2015-11-16), "D.6", UTC #145 Minutes
11.0	U+11D60..11D65, 11D67..11D68, 11D6A..11D8E, 11D90..11D91, 11D93..11D98, 11DA0..11DA9	63	L2/15-235	Pandey, Anshuman (2015-12-05), Proposal to encode the Gunjala Gondi script
11.0	U+11D60..11D65, 11D67..11D68, 11D6A..11D8E, 11D90..11D91, 11D93..11D98, 11DA0..11DA9	63	L2/16-200	Anderson, Deborah (2016-07-20), Gunjala Gondi order
