= Gondi writing =

Writing system

Gondi has typically been written in Devanagari script or Telugu script, but native scripts are in existence. A Gond by the name of Munshi Mangal Singh Masaram designed a Brahmi-based script in 1918, and in 2006, a native script that dates up to 1750 has been discovered by a group of researchers from the University of Hyderabad.

Nonetheless, most Gonds are unaware of their well developed language and do not use any script now. The Gunjala Gondi Lipi has witnessed a surge in prominence, and well-supported efforts are being undertaken in villages of northern Andhra Pradesh to widen its usage.

== Munshi Mangal Singh Masaram script ==
Masaram Gondi 𑴤𑴫𑴦𑴱𑴤 𑴎𑴽𑵀𑴘𑴳
- "Masaram Gondi" written in Masaram Gondi script
- Script type: Abugida
- Period: 1918–present
- Direction: Left-to-right
- Languages: Gondi

ISO 15924
- ISO 15924: Gonm (313), Masaram Gondi

Unicode
- Unicode alias: Masaram Gondi
- Unicode range: U+11D00–U+11D5F Masaram Gondi

In 1918, Munshi Mangal Singh Masaram, a Gond from Balaghat district of Madhya Pradesh, designed a script for Gondi based on Brahmi characters found in other descendant Indian scripts. However, this script is not widely used, even though a few publications have been made available by his followers and supporters.

=== Letters ===
Consonants
𑴌 ka	𑴍 kha	𑴎 ga	𑴏 gha	𑴐 ṅa
𑴑 ca	𑴒 cha	𑴓 ja	𑴔 jha	𑴕 ña
𑴖 ṭa	𑴗 ṭha	𑴘 ḍa	𑴙 ḍha	𑴚 ṇa
𑴛 ta	𑴜 tha	𑴝 da	𑴞 dha	𑴟 na
𑴠 pa	𑴡 pha	𑴢 ba	𑴣 bha	𑴤 ma
𑴥 ya	𑴦 ra	𑴧 la	𑴨 va	
𑴩 śa	𑴪 ṣa	𑴫 sa	𑴬 ha	𑴭 ḷa

Conjunct Consonants
𑴮 kṣa 𑴌+𑴪	𑴯 jña 𑴑+𑴕	𑴰 tra 𑴛+𑴧	𑵆 repha 𑴦+◌	𑵇 ra-kara ◌+𑴦

Vowels
Vowel	a	ā	i	ī	u	ū	r̥
Independent	𑴀	𑴁	𑴂	𑴃	𑴄	𑴅	
Dependent		𑴱	𑴲	𑴳	𑴴	𑴵	𑴶

Vowel	e	ai	o	au
Independent	𑴆	𑴈	𑴉	𑴋
Dependent	𑴺	𑴼	𑴽	𑴿

Signs
𑵀 ṁ	𑵁 ḥ	𑵂 nuqta	𑵃 candra	𑵄 halanta

Digits
𑵐 0	𑵑 1	𑵒 2	𑵓 3	𑵔 4	𑵕 5	𑵖 6	𑵗 7	𑵘 8	𑵙 9

=== Unicode ===
Masaram Gondi script was added to the Unicode Standard in June, 2017 with the release of version 10.0.

The Unicode block for Masaram Gondi is U+11D00–U+11D5F:

Masaram Gondi^{[1]}^{[2]} Official Unicode Consortium code chart (PDF)
	0	1	2	3	4	5	6	7	8	9	A	B	C	D	E	F
U+11D0x	𑴀	𑴁	𑴂	𑴃	𑴄	𑴅	𑴆		𑴈	𑴉		𑴋	𑴌	𑴍	𑴎	𑴏
U+11D1x	𑴐	𑴑	𑴒	𑴓	𑴔	𑴕	𑴖	𑴗	𑴘	𑴙	𑴚	𑴛	𑴜	𑴝	𑴞	𑴟
U+11D2x	𑴠	𑴡	𑴢	𑴣	𑴤	𑴥	𑴦	𑴧	𑴨	𑴩	𑴪	𑴫	𑴬	𑴭	𑴮	𑴯
U+11D3x	𑴰	𑴱	𑴲	𑴳	𑴴	𑴵	𑴶				𑴺		𑴼	𑴽		𑴿
U+11D4x	𑵀	𑵁	𑵂	𑵃	𑵄	𑵅	𑵆	𑵇								
U+11D5x	𑵐	𑵑	𑵒	𑵓	𑵔	𑵕	𑵖	𑵗	𑵘	𑵙						
Notes 1.As of Unicode version 17.0 2.Grey areas indicate non-assigned code points

== Gunjala Gondi Lipi ==
Gunjala Gondi Lipi
- "Gunjala Gondi Lipi" written in Gunjala Gondi script
- Script type: Abugida
- Period: c. 1750–present
- Direction: Left-to-right
- Languages: Gondi

Related scripts
- Parent systems: Proto-Sinaitic alphabet: Phoenician alphabet; Aramaic alphabet; Brāhmī; Gupta; Nāgarī; Gunjala Gondi Lipi

ISO 15924
- ISO 15924: Gong (312), Gunjala Gondi

Unicode
- Unicode alias: Gunjala Gondi

This script is the subject of ongoing linguistic and historical research. Discovered manuscripts have been dated up to 1750, and discuss information from as early as the 6th–7th centuries. Much of the information reveals independence initiatives by the Gond Rajas and encounters with the British. Also, the names of the days of the week, the months, the Gond festivals have been discovered in this Gondi script.

=== Unicode ===
Gunjala Gondi lipi was added to the Unicode Standard in June, 2018 with the release of version 11.0.

The Unicode block for Gunjala Gondi is U+11D60–U+11DAF:

Gunjala Gondi^{[1]}^{[2]} Official Unicode Consortium code chart (PDF)
	0	1	2	3	4	5	6	7	8	9	A	B	C	D	E	F
U+11D6x	𑵠	𑵡	𑵢	𑵣	𑵤	𑵥		𑵧	𑵨		𑵪	𑵫	𑵬	𑵭	𑵮	𑵯
U+11D7x	𑵰	𑵱	𑵲	𑵳	𑵴	𑵵	𑵶	𑵷	𑵸	𑵹	𑵺	𑵻	𑵼	𑵽	𑵾	𑵿
U+11D8x	𑶀	𑶁	𑶂	𑶃	𑶄	𑶅	𑶆	𑶇	𑶈	𑶉	𑶊	𑶋	𑶌	𑶍	𑶎	
U+11D9x	𑶐	𑶑		𑶓	𑶔	𑶕	𑶖	𑶗	𑶘							
U+11DAx	𑶠	𑶡	𑶢	𑶣	𑶤	𑶥	𑶦	𑶧	𑶨	𑶩						
Notes 1.As of Unicode version 17.0 2.Grey areas indicate non-assigned code points

== Gallery ==
=== Alphabet charts of various Scripts used to write Gondi ===
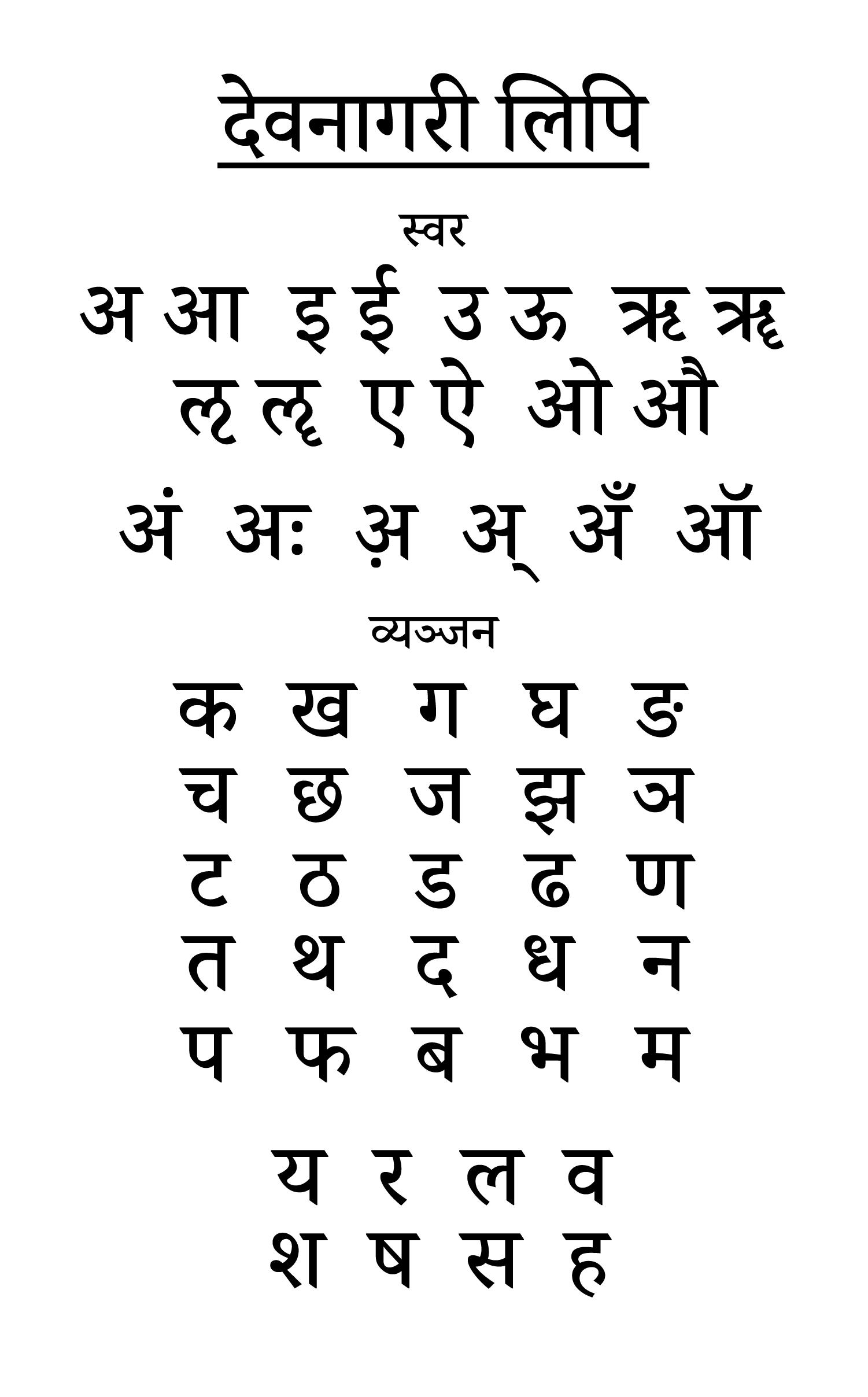
Standard Devanāgarī Varnamala

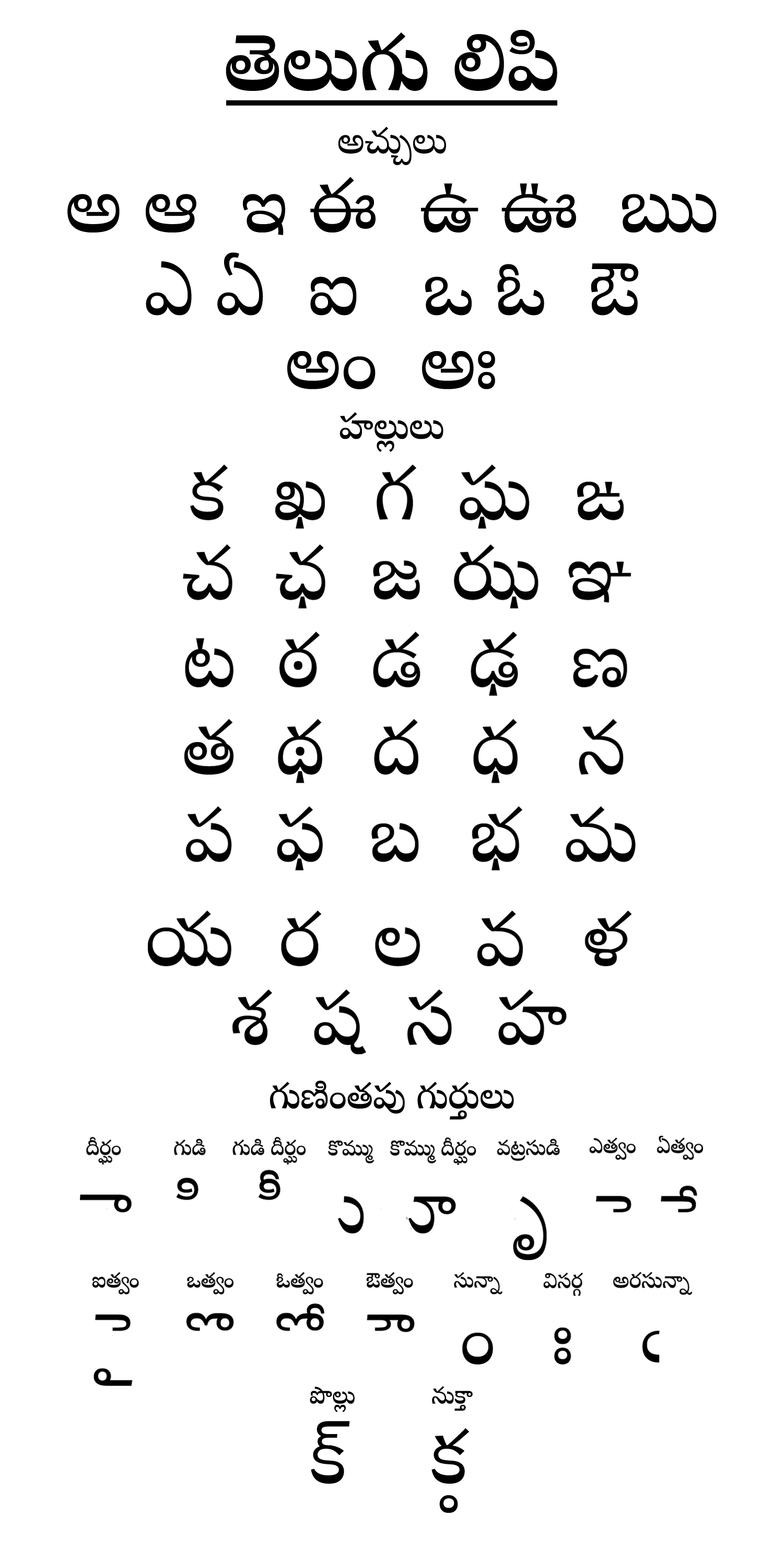
Telugu Aksharamala

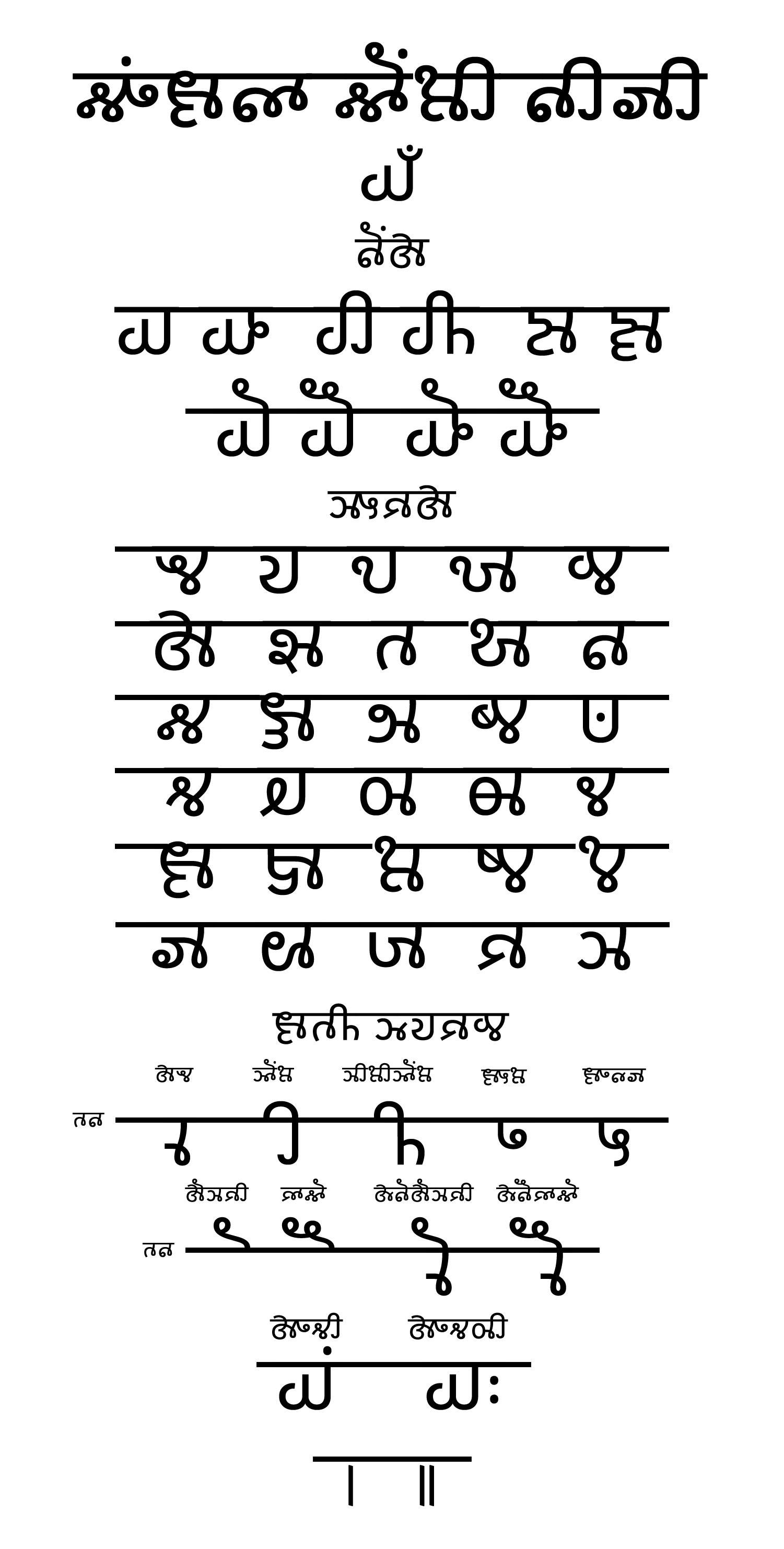
Gunjala Gondi Aksharamala

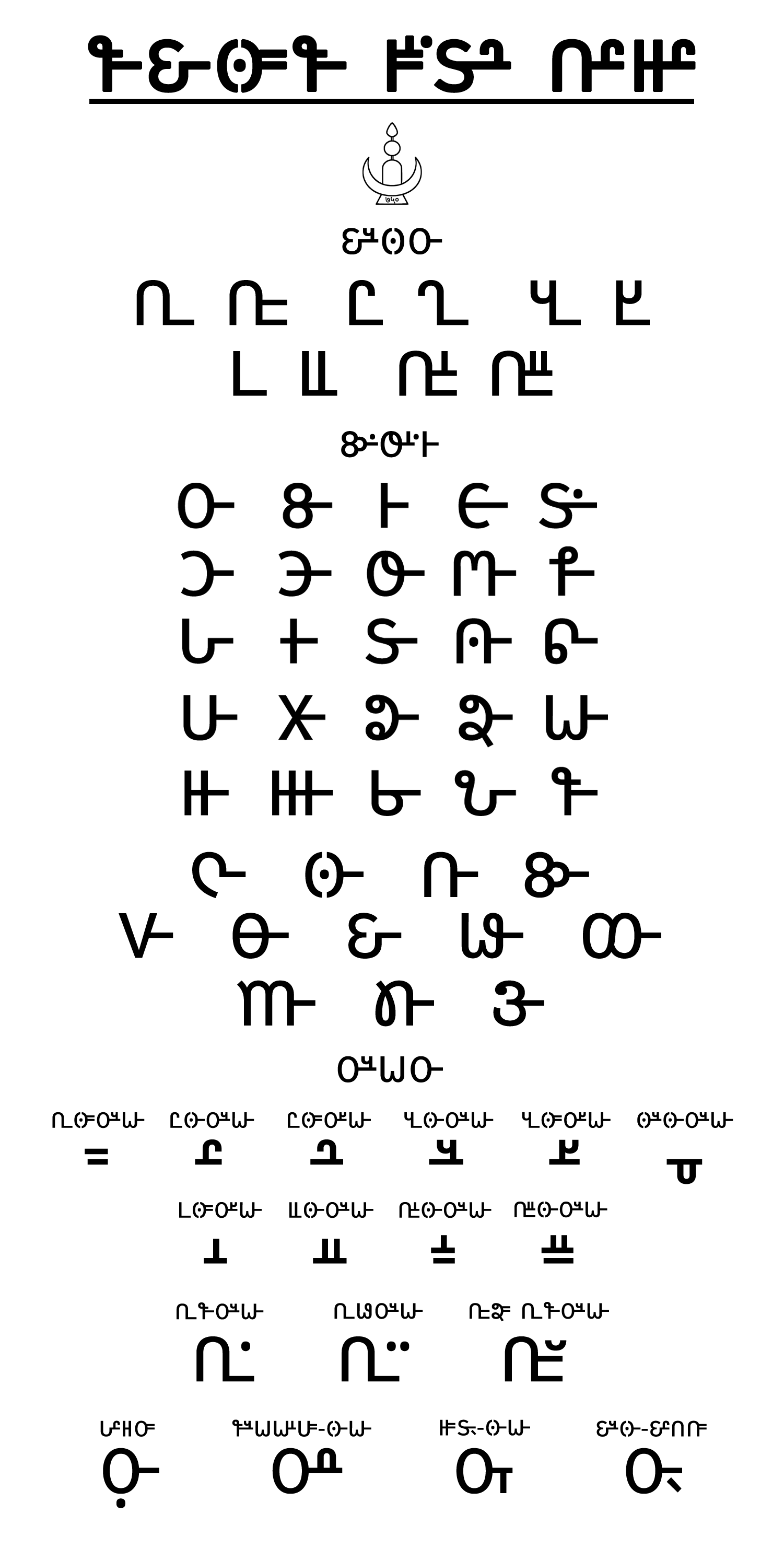
Masaram Gondi Aksharamala
