= Khojki script =

Abugida script

Khojkī 𑈉𑈲𑈐𑈈𑈮
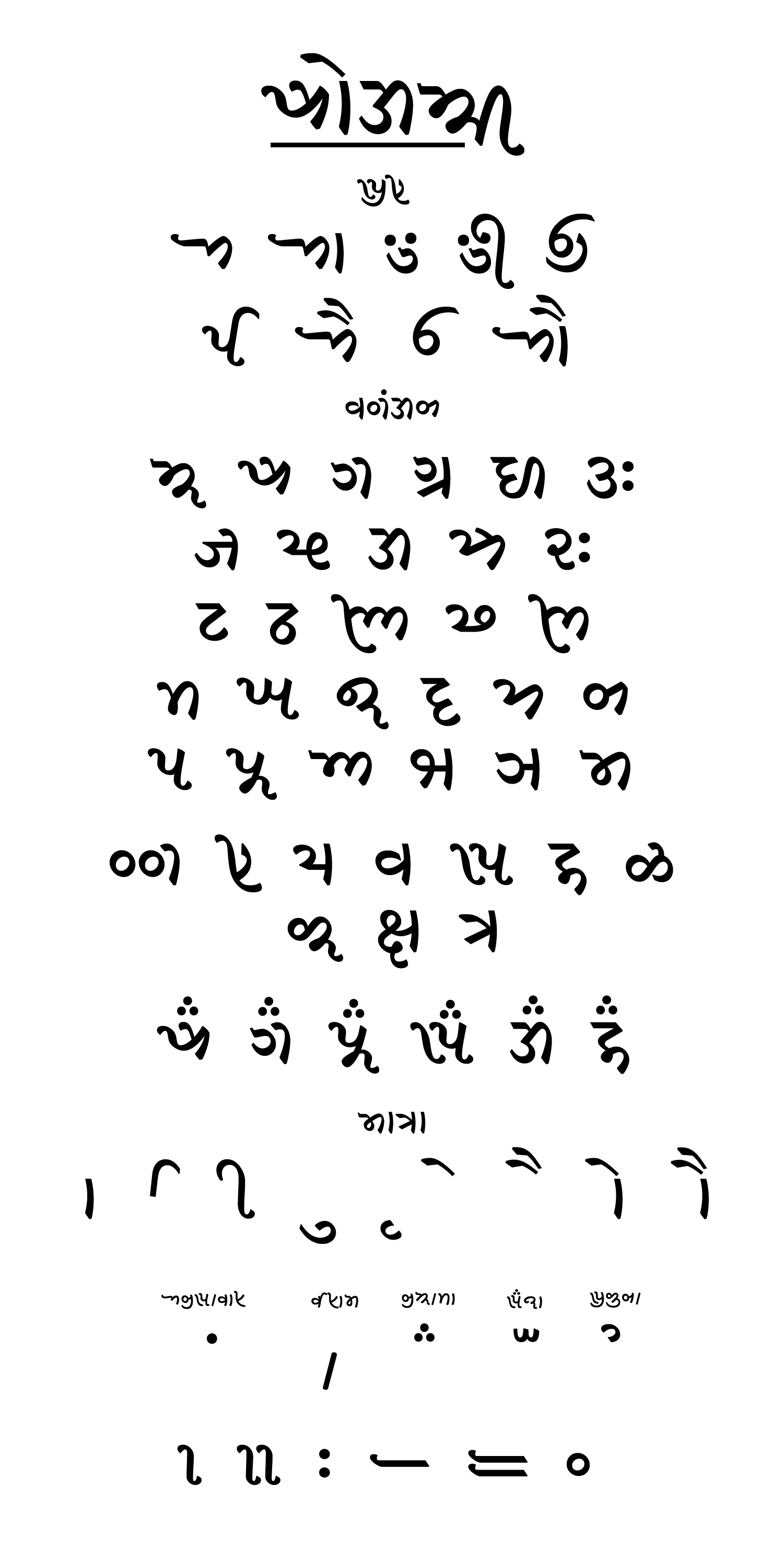
- Khojki alphabet chart divided into 9 vowels, 36 basic consonants, 2 ligatures, 6 foreign sounds, 9 vowel diacritics, 5 special diacritics, and 6 punctuation marks
- Script type: Abugida
- Period: 15th century — 20th century
- Direction: Left-to-right
- Languages: Sindhi, Kutchi, Gujarati

Related scripts
- Parent systems: Proto-Sinaitic script: Phoenician alphabet; Aramaic alphabet; Brahmi; Gupta; Śāradā; Landa; Khojkī
- Sister systems: Gurmukhi, Khudabadi, Mahajani, Multani

ISO 15924
- ISO 15924: Khoj (322), Khojki

Unicode
- Unicode alias: Khojki
- Unicode range: U+11200–U+1124F; Final Accepted Script Proposal

Khojkī (𑈉𑈲𑈐𑈈𑈮), is an abugida Indic script. It is a Northern Brahmic script, a part of its Laṇḍā family of writing systems, and was used to write the Sindhi, Kutchi and Gujarati languages from the 15th to 20th century.

The landā or ‘clipped’ alphabets were primarily employed as commercial and mercantile scripts by various Hindu communities of Sindh and Punjab. The Khojkī script was employed primarily to record Shia Ismaili religious and devotional Islamic literature; most notably in the form of poetry called gināns (a term derived from the Sanskrit jnāna meaning contemplative knowledge). It is one of the two Landā scripts used for liturgy, the other being the Gurmukhī alphabet, which is associated with Sikhism.

The Khojkī script was one of the earliest forms of written Sindhi. It was formerly and almost exclusively by the Khoja Ismaili community. As a scholarly article from 2022 has demonstrated, referring to the script as "Khojki" is a relatively new phenomenon, coined by the Russian scholar Vladimir Ivanow. This neologism began to replace the original terms used by Khoja Ismailis such as Sindhī and Khojā Sindhī. This did not necessarily mean the Sindhi language but rather the script utilized by the Khojas. To avoid confusion, the British administrative bureaucracy added the term Khojā, referring to the script as Khojā Sindhī. The Khoja Ismailis sometimes did the same to distinguish the script from the language, as well as from other scripts used in Sindh. The Khojas continued using the traditional term Sindhī alongside the neologism Khojkī. However, many scholars writing in English and other Western languages dropped the traditional term Sindhī was adopted the invented term Khojkī.

== History and evolution of the script ==
The word Khojki written in Khojki script.

Ginan attributed to Pir Shams from Mahan.

According to the Nizari Ismaili tradition Pīr Ṣadr al-Dīn, the 15th-century dā’ī (preacher), invented the Khojkī script. While it is now firmly established through epigraphic evidence that the script predates the arrival of the dā’ī in the form of the Lohānākī or Lārī script, scholars argue that it is very likely that Pīr Ṣadr al-Dīn did in fact play a pivotal role in the evolution, refinement, and the more widespread use of the script. Ali Asani, a leading scholar of Ismaili literature and one of the very few academics to systematically study Khojkī manuscripts concludes: "we may surmise that Khojkī is most likely a polished or more developed form of Lohānakī with the legendary Pīr Ṣadr al-Dīn perhaps having played a role in its evolution."

The early versions of this script were primarily used for trade and mercantilist documentation and by their nature were not well equipped to record literature. Several main issues included: a very limited vowel system, lack of separation between words, inconsistent orthography, together with redundant and ambiguous characters. Despite the apparent deficiencies of the script, this did not mean that there were not already widespread local literary traditions, but rather that they existed primarily in oral forms. Over time solutions to some of these major issues were introduced into the script, with one of the most significant being the development of medial vowel marks called lākanā. A colon-like form of punctuation was also introduced to distinguish between words. Although these developments came rather early and facilitated the recording of gināns, based on manuscript evidence, it can be inferred that the script was continuously evolving right up until the late 19th century. However, it was a common practice for old and deteriorating manuscripts to be respectfully destroyed upon being recopied, thus making tracing the evolution of the script across time a challenge. Apart from the unknown number of manuscripts in private collections, there are currently three institutional collections at the ITREB-Pakistan (Ismaili Tariqa and Religious Education Board) in Karachi, at the IIS (Institute of Ismaili Studies) in London, and at Harvard University.

In adapting to new printing technologies, the Khojkī script entered a new stage of its development in the early 20th century under the auspices of Lāljī Devrājī, who compiled, edited, and published a range of materials in Khojkī through his Khoja Sindhi Printing Press in Bombay. Despite these efforts to utilize various new printing technologies, Dr. Asani reflects that "ironically, the introduction of printing may have also sounded the deathknell for the script." Several factors contributed to this decline. During the early 20th century, the "publication of religious literature was centralized and brought under the control of community institutions." While on the one hand this larger institutional backing aided in more widespread availability and distribution of texts in Khojkī. On the other, "regional variations were a serious problem" because of the "lack of uniformity in the script in different geographical areas." Additionally, efforts made by the Ismaili Imamate institution to standardize rituals and shift away from the more "Indic" elements that became part of religious, cultural, and linguistic identity of Khoja communities also played a significant role in the shift away from using the Khojkī script. Even though Khojkī is no longer a "living script" access to this corpus can provide unique insights into the ways in which the Ismaili tradition grew and adapted in this specific cultural context, as well as offering insights into how this community envisioned and constructed their own history and identity.

== Script and identity ==
As is explained by Michel Boivin, for the contemporary Khoja community, because the gināns are at the core of the Khoja religious heritage, "they quickly became a crucial stake in the process of identity construction." Asani argues that "in the Ismaili case the adoption of the Khojkī script, a ‘local’ script, was probably part of the attempt to make religious literature more accessible by recording it in a script with which the local population had the greatest familiarity." In reflecting upon the larger history of the script and the literary tradition Asani also posits several other reasons as to why Khojkī was adopted and continuously refined by the local Ismaili community:

…by providing an exclusive means of written expression commonly shared by Ismailis living in the three regions (Sind, Punjab and Gujrat), was influential in the development of the cohesion and self-identity within a widely scattered and linguistically diverse religious community. No doubt the script facilitated the flow and the transmission of religious literature from one area to another. Use of the script may have also served to confine religious literature within the community—this precaution being necessary to avoid persecution from outsiders not in agreement with the community’s doctrines and practices. In this respect, Khojkī may have served the same purpose as the secret languages, such as the so-called Balabailān language, used by Muslim mystics to hide their more esoteric thoughts from the common people.

== Characters ==
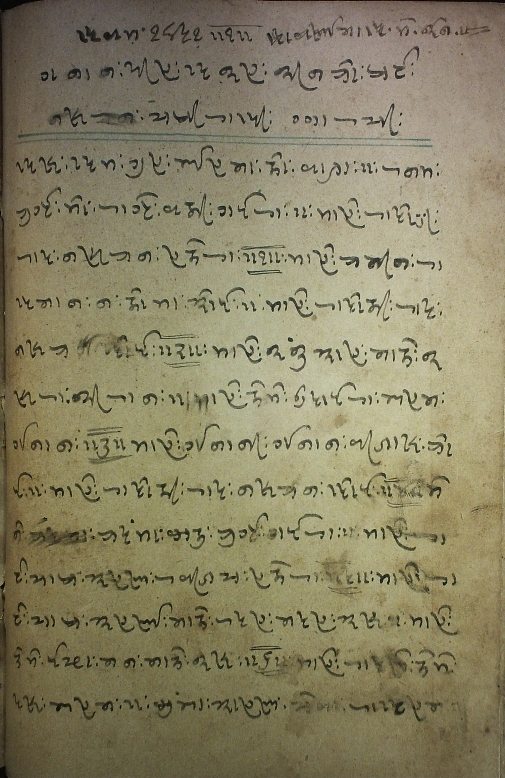
First page of the "Khat Nirinjan" composition written in Khojki script, 1895.

Traditionally, diphthong vowels were written as a combination of vowel forms, and there were multiple forms of writing some of them. This is also true of the virama. There are also contextual variants of consonant-vowel combinations for some vowels, as is found in the Modi script. For conjuncts, there are a few 'inherent' conjuncts found in most Indic scripts, such as ksa, jna, and tra, and dra is also found in addition. Most consonant conjuncts are written using the virama pattern, as is found in the Saurashtra script or in the Tamil script, but some are written with a reduced consonant form on the second consonant in the cluster, typically with ra and ya. Gemination is indicated with the Arabic shadda, while nasalization is indicated with an anusvara that is reminiscent of Devanagari in position but of Telugu, Kannada, or Malayalam in shape. The nuqta is composed of three dots, similar to the three dots found in modifying historically Arabic letters in the Persian script, and it is added to certain letters to form Arabic sounds. They can sometimes be ambiguous, with the nukta over the same letter sometimes mapping to multiple Arabic letters, as in ja or as in sa. Punctuation exists for marking word boundaries using colon-like marks, section boundaries using a combination of colon-like marks and double danda-like marks, and other Latin punctuation is also present. Abbreviation marks are represented by a small circle to the side, as is found in Modi and in Goykanadi. Verse numbering is indicated by an overline and digits and number forms typically use those found throughout North India in the region. Some additional letters and forms have been found, are detailed in the Unicode Proposal, and are being researched.

Over time some of the characters represented different sounds, which makes it difficult to read certain texts with the historical phonological values as compared to those with the modern phonological values known to most modern readers of published Ismaili literature. This is particularly true of the implosives, aspirates, and normal forms of ba, da, and ja, which shifted to render the implosive letter as a normal letter phonologically, the normal letter as an aspirated letter phonologically, and rendered the aspirated letter unnecessary. The implosive for ja began to represent za.

Consonants
𑈈 ka	𑈉 kha	𑈊 ga	𑈊 ḡa	𑈌 gha	𑈍 nga
𑈎 ca	𑈏 cha	𑈐 ja	𑈑 ȷ̄a		𑈓 ña
𑈔 ṭa	𑈕 ṭha	𑈖 ḍa		𑈗 ḍha	𑈘 ṇa
𑈙 ta	𑈚 tha	𑈛 da	𑈜 ḏa	𑈝 dha	𑈞 na
𑈟 pa	𑈠 pha	𑈡 ba	𑈢 ḇa	𑈣 bha	𑈤 ma
𑈥 ya	𑈦 ra	𑈧 la	𑈨 va		
𑈩 sa	𑈪 ha	𑈫 ḷa		𑈿 qa	

Vowels
Vowel	a	ā	i	ī	u	r̥
Independent	𑈀	𑈁	𑉀	𑈂	𑈃	
Dependent		𑈬	𑈭	𑈮	𑈯	𑉁

Vowel	e	ai	o	au
Independent	𑈄	𑈅	𑈆	𑈇
Dependent	𑈰	𑈱	𑈲	𑈳

Signs
𑈴 ṁ	𑘾 ḥ	𑈵 virama	𑈶 nuqta	𑈷 shadda	𑈾 sukun

Punctuations
𑈸 danda	𑈹 double danda	𑈺 word sep.	𑈻 section	𑈼 double section	𑈽 abbr. sign

== Unicode ==
Khojki script was added to the Unicode Standard in June, 2014 with the release of version 7.0.

The Unicode block for Khojki is U+11200–U+1124F:

Khojki^{[1]}^{[2]} Official Unicode Consortium code chart (PDF)
	0	1	2	3	4	5	6	7	8	9	A	B	C	D	E	F
U+1120x	𑈀	𑈁	𑈂	𑈃	𑈄	𑈅	𑈆	𑈇	𑈈	𑈉	𑈊	𑈋	𑈌	𑈍	𑈎	𑈏
U+1121x	𑈐	𑈑		𑈓	𑈔	𑈕	𑈖	𑈗	𑈘	𑈙	𑈚	𑈛	𑈜	𑈝	𑈞	𑈟
U+1122x	𑈠	𑈡	𑈢	𑈣	𑈤	𑈥	𑈦	𑈧	𑈨	𑈩	𑈪	𑈫	𑈬	𑈭	𑈮	𑈯
U+1123x	𑈰	𑈱	𑈲	𑈳	𑈴	𑈵	𑈶	𑈷	𑈸	𑈹	𑈺	𑈻	𑈼	𑈽	𑈾	𑈿
U+1124x	𑉀	𑉁														
Notes 1.As of Unicode version 18.0 2.Grey areas indicate non-assigned code points

Number forms and unit marks used in Khojki documents are located in the Common Indic Number Forms Unicode block (U+A830–U+U+A83F):

Common Indic Number Forms^{[1]}^{[2]} Official Unicode Consortium code chart (PDF)
	0	1	2	3	4	5	6	7	8	9	A	B	C	D	E	F
U+A83x	꠰	꠱	꠲	꠳	꠴	꠵	꠶	꠷	꠸	꠹						
Notes 1.As of Unicode version 18.0 2.Grey areas indicate non-assigned code points
