= Da (Indic) =

Letter "Da" in Indic scripts

Example glyphs
- Bengali–Assamese: Da
- Tibetan: Da
- Thai: ท
- Malayalam: ദ
- Sinhala: ද
- Ashoka Brahmi: Da
- Devanagari: Da

Cognates
- Hebrew: ד
- Greek: Δ
- Latin: D
- Cyrillic: Д

Properties
- Phonemic representation: /d/ /t/^{B}
- IAST transliteration: d D
- ISCII code point: C4 (196)

Da is a consonant of Indic abugidas. In modern Indic scripts, Da is derived from the early "Ashoka" Brahmi letter after having gone through the Gupta letter.

== Āryabhaṭa numeration ==
Aryabhata used Devanagari letters for numbers, very similar to the Greek numerals, even after the invention of Indian numerals. The values of the different forms of द are:

- द [də] = 18 (१८)
- दि [dɪ] = 1,800 (१ ८००)
- दु [dʊ] = 180,000 (१ ८० ०००)
- दृ [dri] = 18,000,000 (१ ८० ०० ०००)
- दॢ [dlə] = 18×10^{8} (१८×१०^{८})
- दे [de] = 18×10^{10} (१८×१०^{१०})
- दै [dɛː] = 18×10^{12} (१८×१०^{१२})
- दो [doː] = 18×10^{14} (१८×१०^{१४})
- दौ [dɔː] = 18×10^{16} (१८×१०^{१६})

== Historic Da ==
There are three different general early historic scripts - Brahmi and its variants, Kharoṣṭhī, and Tocharian, the so-called slanting Brahmi. Da as found in standard Brahmi, was a simple geometric shape, with variations toward more flowing forms by the Gupta. The Tocharian Da did not have an alternate Fremdzeichen form. The third form of da, in Kharoshthi was probably derived from Aramaic separately from the Brahmi letter.

=== Brahmi Da ===
The Brahmi letter, Da, is probably derived from the altered Aramaic Dalet, and is thus related to the modern Latin D and Greek Delta. Several identifiable styles of writing the Brahmi Da can be found, most associated with a specific set of inscriptions from an artifact or diverse records from an historic period. As the earliest and most geometric style of Brahmi, the letters found on the Edicts of Ashoka and other records from around that time are normally the reference form for Brahmi letters, with vowel marks not attested until later forms of Brahmi back-formed to match the geometric writing style.

Brahmi Da historic forms
| Ashoka (3rd-1st c. BCE) | Girnar (~150 BCE) | Kushana (~150-250 CE) | Gujarat (~250 CE) | Gupta (~350 CE) |

=== Tocharian Da ===
The Tocharian letter is derived from the Brahmi, but does not have an alternate Fremdzeichen form.

Tocharian Da with vowel marks
| Da | Dā | Di | Dī | Du | Dū | Dr | Dr̄ | De | Dai | Do | Dau | Dä |

=== Kharoṣṭhī Da ===
The Kharoṣṭhī letter is generally accepted as being derived from the altered Aramaic Dalet, and is thus related to D and Delta, in addition to the Brahmi Da.

== Devanagari Da ==
Da (द) is a consonant of the Devanagari abugida. It ultimately arose from the Brahmi letter, after having gone through the Gupta letter. Letters that derive from it are the Gujarati letter દ, and the Modi letter 𑘟.

=== Devanagari-using Languages ===
In all languages, द is pronounced as [də] or [d] when appropriate. Like all Indic scripts, Devanagari uses vowel marks attached to the base consonant to override the inherent /ə/ vowel:

Devanagari द with vowel marks
| Da | Dā | Di | Dī | Du | Dū | Dr | Dr̄ | Dl | Dl̄ | De | Dai | Do | Dau | D |
|---|---|---|---|---|---|---|---|---|---|---|---|---|---|---|
| द | दा | दि | दी | दु | दू | दृ | दॄ | दॢ | दॣ | दे | दै | दो | दौ | द् |

=== Conjuncts with द ===
Devanagari exhibits conjunct ligatures, as is common in Indic scripts. In modern Devanagari texts, most conjuncts are formed by reducing the letter shape to fit tightly to the following letter, usually by dropping a character's vertical stem, sometimes referred to as a "half form". Some conjunct clusters are always represented by a true ligature, instead of a shape that can be broken into constituent independent letters. Vertically stacked conjuncts are ubiquitous in older texts, while only a few are still used routinely in modern Devanagari texts. Lacking a vertical stem to drop for making a half form, Da either forms a stacked conjunct/ligature, or uses its full form with Virama. The use of ligatures and vertical conjuncts may vary across languages using the Devanagari script, with Marathi in particular avoiding their use where other languages would use them.

==== Ligature conjuncts of द ====
True ligatures are quite rare in Indic scripts. The most common ligated conjuncts in Devanagari are in the form of a slight mutation to fit in context or as a consistent variant form appended to the adjacent characters. Those variants include Na and the Repha and Rakar forms of Ra. Nepali and Marathi texts use the "eyelash" Ra half form for an initial "R" instead of repha.

- Repha र্ (r) + द (da) gives the ligature rda: ^{note}

- Eyelash र্ (r) + द (da) gives the ligature rda:

- द্ (d) + न (na) gives the ligature dna:

- द্ (d) + rakar र (ra) gives the ligature dra:

- द্ (d) + द (da) gives the ligature dda:

- द্ (d) + द্ (d) + rakar र (ra) gives the ligature ddra:

- द্ (d) + द্ (d) + य (ya) gives the ligature ddya:

- द্ (d) + ध (dʱa) gives the ligature ddʱa:

- द্ (d) + ध্ (dʱ) + म (ma) gives the ligature ddʱma:

- द্ (d) + ध্ (dʱ) + व (va) gives the ligature ddʱva:

- न্ (n) + द্ (d) + ध (dʱa) gives the ligature nddʱa:

- Repha र্ (r) + द্ (d) + ध (dʱa) gives the ligature rddʱa:

- द্ (d) + य (ya) gives the ligature dya:

==== Stacked conjuncts of द ====
Vertically stacked ligatures are the most common conjunct forms found in Devanagari text. Although the constituent characters may need to be stretched and moved slightly in order to stack neatly, stacked conjuncts can be broken down into recognizable base letters, or a letter and an otherwise standard ligature.

- छ্ (cʰ) + द (da) gives the ligature cʰda:

- द্ (d) + ब (ba) gives the ligature dba:

- द্ (d) + भ (bʰa) gives the ligature dbʰa:

- द্ (d) + ब্ (b) + rakar र (ra) gives the ligature dbra:

- द্ (d) + च (ca) gives the ligature dca:

- द্ (d) + छ (cʰa) gives the ligature dcʰa:

- ड্ (ḍ) + द (da) gives the ligature ḍda:

- द্ (d) + ड (ḍa) gives the ligature dḍa:

- द্ (d) + ढ (ḍʱa) gives the ligature dḍʱa:

- ढ্ (ḍʱ) + द (da) gives the ligature ḍʱda:

- द্ (d) + ग (ga) gives the ligature dga:

- द্ (d) + घ (ɡʱa) gives the ligature dɡʱa:

- द্ (d) + ग্ (g) + rakar र (ra) gives the ligature dgra:

- द্ (d) + ह (ha) gives the ligature dha:

- द্ (d) + ज (ja) gives the ligature dja:

- द্ (d) + झ (jʰa) gives the ligature djʰa:

- द্ (d) + ज্ (j) + ञ (ña) gives the ligature djña:

- द্ (d) + क (ka) gives the ligature dka:

- द্ (d) + ख (kʰa) gives the ligature dkʰa:

- द্ (d) + क্ (k) + ष (ṣa) gives the ligature dkṣa:

- द্ (d) + ल (la) gives the ligature dla:

- द্ (d) + ळ (ḷa) gives the ligature dḷa:

- द্ (d) + म (ma) gives the ligature dma:

- द্ (d) + ङ (ŋa) gives the ligature dŋa:

- द্ (d) + ण (ṇa) gives the ligature dṇa:

- द্ (d) + ञ (ña) gives the ligature dña:

- द্ (d) + प (pa) gives the ligature dpa:

- द্ (d) + फ (pʰa) gives the ligature dpʰa:

- द্ (d) + स (sa) gives the ligature dsa:

- द্ (d) + श (ʃa) gives the ligature dʃa:

- द্ (d) + ष (ṣa) gives the ligature dṣa:

- द্ (d) + त (ta) gives the ligature dta:

- द্ (d) + थ (tʰa) gives the ligature dtʰa:

- द্ (d) + ट (ṭa) gives the ligature dṭa:

- द্ (d) + ठ (ṭʰa) gives the ligature dṭʰa:

- द্ (d) + व (va) gives the ligature dva:

- द্ (d) + व্ (v) + य (ya) gives the ligature dvya:

- ङ্ (ŋ) + द (da) gives the ligature ŋda:

- Repha र্ (r) + द্ (d) + व (va) gives the ligature rdva:

- ट্ (ṭ) + द (da) gives the ligature ṭda:

- ठ্ (ṭʰ) + द (da) gives the ligature ṭʰda:

== Bengali Da ==
The Bengali script দ is derived from the Siddhaṃ, and is marked by a similar horizontal head line, but less geometric shape, than its Devanagari counterpart, द. The inherent vowel of Bengali consonant letters is /ɔ/, so the bare letter দ will sometimes be transliterated as "do" instead of "da". Adding okar, the "o" vowel mark, gives a reading of /d̪o/. Like all Indic consonants, দ can be modified by marks to indicate another (or no) vowel than its inherent "a".

Bengali দ with vowel marks
| da | dā | di | dī | du | dū | dr | dr̄ | de | dai | do | dau | d |
|---|---|---|---|---|---|---|---|---|---|---|---|---|
| দ | দা | দি | দী | দু | দূ | দৃ | দৄ | দে | দৈ | দো | দৌ | দ্ |

=== দ in Bengali-using languages ===
দ is used as a basic consonant character in all of the major Bengali script orthographies, including Bengali and Assamese.

=== Conjuncts with দ ===
Bengali দ exhibits conjunct ligatures, as is common in Indic scripts, with a tendency towards stacked ligatures.

- ব্ (b) + দ (da) gives the ligature bda:

- দ্ (d) + ভ (bʰa) gives the ligature dbʰa:

- দ্ (d) + ভ্ (bʰ) + র (ra) gives the ligature dbʰra, with the ra phala suffix:

- দ্ (d) + দ (da) gives the ligature dda:

- দ্ (d) + ধ (dʱa) gives the ligature ddʱa:

- দ্ (d) + দ্ (d) + ব (va) gives the ligature ddva, with the va phala suffix:

- দ্ (d) + গ (ga) gives the ligature dga:

- দ্ (d) + ঘ (ɡʱa) gives the ligature dɡʱa:

- দ্ (d) + ম (ma) gives the ligature dma:

- দ্ (d) + র (ra) gives the ligature dra, with the ra phala suffix:

- দ্ (d) + র্ (r) + য (ya) gives the ligature drya, with the ra phala and ya phala suffixes

- দ্ (d) + ব (va) gives the ligature dva, with the va phala suffix:

- দ্ (d) + য (ya) gives the ligature dya, with the ya phala suffix:

- ন্ (n) + দ (da) gives the ligature nda:

- ন্ (n) + দ্ (d) + র (ra) gives the ligature ndra, with the ra phala suffix:

- ন্ (n) + দ্ (d) + ব (va) gives the ligature ndva, with the va phala suffix:

- ন্ (n) + দ্ (d) + য (ya) gives the ligature ndya, with the ya phala suffix:

- র্ (r) + দ (da) gives the ligature rda, with the repha prefix:

- র্ (r) + দ্ (d) + র (ra) gives the ligature rdra, with the repha prefix and ra phala suffix:

- র্ (r) + দ্ (d) + ব (va) gives the ligature rdva, with the repha prefix and va phala suffix:

== Gujarati Da ==
Gujarati Da.

Da (દ) is the eighteenth consonant of the Gujarati abugida. It is derived from the Devanagari Da with the top bar (shiro rekha) removed, and ultimately the Brahmi letter.

=== Gujarati-using Languages ===
The Gujarati script is used to write the Gujarati and Kutchi languages. In both languages, દ is pronounced as [də] or [d] when appropriate. Like all Indic scripts, Gujarati uses vowel marks attached to the base consonant to override the inherent /ə/ vowel:

| Da | Dā | Di | Dī | Du | Dū | Dr | Dl | Dr̄ | Dl̄ | Dĕ | De | Dai | Dŏ | Do | Dau | D |
|---|---|---|---|---|---|---|---|---|---|---|---|---|---|---|---|---|
Gujarati Da syllables, with vowel marks in red.

=== Conjuncts with દ ===
Gujarati દ exhibits conjunct ligatures, much like its parent Devanagari Script. While most Gujarati conjuncts can only be formed by reducing the letter shape to create a "half form" that fits tightly to following letter, Da does not have a half form. A few conjunct clusters can be represented by a true ligature, instead of a shape that can be broken into constituent independent letters, and vertically stacked conjuncts can also be found in Gujarati, although much less commonly than in Devanagari. Lacking a half form, Da will normally use an explicit virama when forming conjuncts without a true ligature. True ligatures are quite rare in Indic scripts. The most common ligated conjuncts in Gujarati are in the form of a slight mutation to fit in context or as a consistent variant form appended to the adjacent characters. Those variants include Na and the Repha and Rakar forms of Ra.

- ર્ (r) + દ (da) gives the ligature RDa:

- દ્ (d) + ર (ra) gives the ligature DRa:

- દ્ (d) + ગ (ga) gives the ligature DGa:

- દ્ (d) + ઘ (ɡʱa) gives the ligature DGha:

- દ્ (d) + ધ (dʱa) gives the ligature DDha:

- દ્ (d) + ન (na) gives the ligature DNa:

- દ્ (d) + બ (ba) gives the ligature DBa:

- દ્ (d) + મ (ma) gives the ligature DMa:

- દ્ (d) + વ (va) gives the ligature DVa:

== Telugu Da ==
Telugu independent and subjoined Da.

Da (ద) is a consonant of the Telugu abugida. It ultimately arose from the Brahmi letter. It is closely related to the Kannada letter ದ. Most Telugu consonants contain a v-shaped headstroke that is related to the horizontal headline found in other Indic scripts, although headstrokes do not connect adjacent letters in Telugu. The headstroke is normally lost when adding vowel matras. Telugu conjuncts are created by reducing trailing letters to a subjoined form that appears below the initial consonant of the conjunct. Many subjoined forms are created by dropping their headline, with many extending the end of the stroke of the main letter body to form an extended tail reaching up to the right of the preceding consonant. This subjoining of trailing letters to create conjuncts is in contrast to the leading half forms of Devanagari and Bengali letters. Ligature conjuncts are not a feature in Telugu, with the only non-standard construction being an alternate subjoined form of Ṣa (borrowed from Kannada) in the KṢa conjunct.

== Malayalam Da ==
Malayalam letter Da

Da (ദ) is a consonant of the Malayalam abugida. It ultimately arose from the Brahmi letter, via the Grantha letter Da. Like in other Indic scripts, Malayalam consonants have the inherent vowel "a", and take one of several modifying vowel signs to represent syllables with another vowel or no vowel at all.

Malayalam Da matras: Da, Dā, Di, Dī, Du, Dū, Dr̥, Dr̥̄, Dl̥, Dl̥̄, De, Dē, Dai, Do, Dō, Dau, and D.

=== Conjuncts of ദ ===
As is common in Indic scripts, Malayalam joins letters together to form conjunct consonant clusters. There are several ways in which conjuncts are formed in Malayalam texts: using a post-base form of a trailing consonant placed under the initial consonant of a conjunct, a combined ligature of two or more consonants joined together, a conjoining form that appears as a combining mark on the rest of the conjunct, the use of an explicit candrakkala mark to suppress the inherent "a" vowel, or a special consonant form called a "chillu" letter, representing a bare consonant without the inherent "a" vowel. Texts written with the modern reformed Malayalam orthography, put̪iya lipi, may favor more regular conjunct forms than older texts in paḻaya lipi, due to changes undertaken in the 1970s by the Government of Kerala.

- ഗ് (g) + ദ (da) gives the ligature gda:

- ദ് (d) + ദ (da) gives the ligature dda:

- ന് (n) + ദ (da) gives the ligature nda:

- ബ് (b) + ദ (da) gives the ligature bda:

- ദ് (d) + ധ (dʱa) gives the ligature ddʱa:

== Odia Da ==
Odia independent and subjoined letter Da.

Da (ଦ) is a consonant of the Odia abugida. It ultimately arose from the Brahmi letter, via the Siddhaṃ letter Da. Like in other Indic scripts, Odia consonants have the inherent vowel "a", and take one of several modifying vowel signs to represent syllables with another vowel or no vowel at all.

Odia Da with vowel matras
| Da | Dā | Di | Dī | Du | Dū | Dr̥ | Dr̥̄ | Dl̥ | Dl̥̄ | De | Dai | Do | Dau | D |
|---|---|---|---|---|---|---|---|---|---|---|---|---|---|---|
| ଦ | ଦା | ଦି | ଦୀ | ଦୁ | ଦୂ | ଦୃ | ଦୄ | ଦୢ | ଦୣ | ଦେ | ଦୈ | ଦୋ | ଦୌ | ଦ୍ |

=== Conjuncts of ଦ ===
As is common in Indic scripts, Odia joins letters together to form conjunct consonant clusters. The most common conjunct formation is achieved by using a small subjoined form of trailing consonants. Most consonants' subjoined forms are identical to the full form, just reduced in size, although a few drop the curved headline or have a subjoined form not directly related to the full form of the consonant. The second type of conjunct formation is through pure ligatures, where the constituent consonants are written together in a single graphic form. This ligature may be recognizable as being a combination of two characters or it can have a conjunct ligature unrelated to its constituent characters.

- ଦ୍ (d) + ଦ (da) gives the ligature dda:

- ଦ୍ (d) + ଧ (dʱa) gives the ligature ddʱa:

- ନ୍ (n) + ଦ (da) gives the ligature nda:

== Kaithi Da ==
Kaithi consonant Da.

Da (𑂠) is a consonant of the Kaithi abugida. It ultimately arose from the Brahmi letter, via the Siddhaṃ letter Da. Like in other Indic scripts, Kaithi consonants have the inherent vowel "a", and take one of several modifying vowel signs to represent syllables with another vowel or no vowel at all.

Kaithi Da with vowel matras
| Da | Dā | Di | Dī | Du | Dū | De | Dai | Do | Dau | D |
|---|---|---|---|---|---|---|---|---|---|---|
| 𑂠 | 𑂠𑂰 | 𑂠𑂱 | 𑂠𑂲 | 𑂠𑂳 | 𑂠𑂴 | 𑂠𑂵 | 𑂠𑂶 | 𑂠𑂷 | 𑂠𑂸 | 𑂠𑂹 |

=== Conjuncts of 𑂠 ===
As is common in Indic scripts, Odia joins letters together to form conjunct consonant clusters. The most common conjunct formation is achieved by using a half form of preceding consonants, although several consonants use an explicit virama. Most half forms are derived from the full form by removing the vertical stem. As is common in most Indic scripts, conjuncts of ra are indicated with a repha or rakar mark attached to the rest of the consonant cluster. In addition, there are a few vertical conjuncts that can be found in Kaithi writing, but true ligatures are not used in the modern Kaithi script.

- 𑂩୍ (r) + 𑂠 (da) gives the ligature rda:

== Tirhuta Da ==
Tirhuta consonant Da

Da (𑒠) is a consonant of the Tirhuta abugida. It ultimately arose from the Brahmi letter, via the Siddhaṃ letter Da. Like in other Indic scripts, Tirhuta consonants have the inherent vowel "a", and take one of several modifying vowel signs to represent sylables with another vowel or no vowel at all.

Tirhuta Da with vowel matras
| Da | Dā | Di | Dī | Du | Dū | Dṛ | Dṝ | Dḷ | Dḹ | Dē | De | Dai | Dō | Do | Dau | D |
|---|---|---|---|---|---|---|---|---|---|---|---|---|---|---|---|---|
| 𑒠 | 𑒠𑒰 | 𑒠𑒱 | 𑒠𑒲 | 𑒠𑒳 | 𑒠𑒴 | 𑒠𑒵 | 𑒠𑒶 | 𑒠𑒷 | 𑒠𑒸 | 𑒠𑒹 | 𑒠𑒺 | 𑒠𑒻 | 𑒠𑒼 | 𑒠𑒽 | 𑒠𑒾 | 𑒠𑓂 |

=== Conjuncts of 𑒠 ===
As is common in Indic scripts, Tirhuta joins letters together to form conjunct consonant clusters. The most common conjunct formation is achieved by using an explicit virama. As is common in most Indic scripts, conjuncts of ra are indicated with a repha or rakar mark attached to the rest of the consonant cluster. In addition, other consonants take unique combining forms when in conjunct with other letters, and there are several vertical conjuncts and true ligatures that can be found in Tirhuta writing.

- 𑒥୍ (b) + 𑒠 (da) gives the ligature bda:

- 𑒠୍ (d) + 𑒡 (dʱa) gives the ligature ddʱa:

- 𑒠୍ (d) + 𑒩 (ra) gives the ligature dra:

- 𑒠 (d) + 𑒅 (u) gives the ligature du:

- 𑒠୍ (d) + 𑒫 (va) gives the ligature dva:

- 𑒠୍ (d) + 𑒨 (ya) gives the ligature dya:

- 𑒢୍ (n) + 𑒠 (da) gives the ligature nda:

- 𑒩୍ (r) + 𑒠 (da) gives the ligature rda:

- 𑒞୍ (t) + 𑒠 (da) gives the ligature tda:

== Comparison of Da ==
The various Indic scripts are generally related to each other through adaptation and borrowing, and as such the glyphs for cognate letters, including Da, are related as well.

Comparison of Da in different scripts

Aramaic
Kharoṣṭhī 𐨡 | Ashoka Brahmi | Kushana Brahmi (Note: The middle "Kushana" form of Brahmi is a later style that emerged as Brahmi scripts were beginning to proliferate. Gupta Brahmi was definitely a stylistic descendant from Kushana, but other Brahmi-derived scripts may have descended from earlier forms.) | Tocharian (Note: Tocharian is probably derived from the middle period "Kushana" form of Brahmi, although artifacts from that time are not plentiful enough to establish a definite succession.)
Gupta Brahmi | Pallava
Kadamba -
Bhaiksuki 𑰟 | Siddhaṃ | Grantha 𑌦 | Cham ꨕ
Sinhala ද | Pyu / Old Mon (Note: Pyu and Old Mon are probably the precursors of the Burmese script, and may be derived from either the Pallava or Kadamba script) -
Tibetan | Newa 𑐡 | Ahom 𑜓 | Malayalam ദ
Telugu ద | Burmese ဒ
Lepcha ᰌ | Ranjana | Saurashtra ꢣ | Dives Akuru 𑤝
Kannada ದ | Kayah Li ꤘ
Limbu ᤍ | Soyombo (Note: May also be derived from Devangari (see bottom left of table)) 𑩭 | Khmer ទ | Tamil -
Chakma 𑄘 | Tai Tham ᨴ
Meitei Mayek ꯗ | Gaudi - | Thai ท | Lao ທ
Tai Le -
Marchen 𑱼 | Tirhuta 𑒠 | New Tai Lue ᦑ | Tai Viet ꪒ / ꪓ | Aksara Kawi
'Phags-pa ꡊ | Odia ଦ | Sharada 𑆢 | Rejang ꤴ | Batak ᯑ | Buginese ᨉ
Zanabazar Square 𑨛 | Bengali-Assamese | Takri 𑚛 | Javanese ꦢ | Balinese ᬤ | Makasar 𑻧
Hangul (Note: The Origin of Hangul from 'Phags-pa is one of limited influence, inspiring at most a few basic letter shapes. Hangul does not function as an Indic abugida.) ㄷ | Northern Nagari - | Dogri 𑠛 | Laṇḍā - | Sundanese ᮓ | Baybayin ᜇ
Modi 𑘟 | Gujarati દ | Khojki 𑈛 | Khudabadi 𑋏 | Mahajani 𑅥 | Tagbanwa ᝧ
Devanagari | Nandinagari 𑦿 | Kaithi | Gurmukhi ਦ | Multani 𑊘 | Buhid ᝇ
Canadian Syllabics (Note: Although the basic letter forms of the Canadian Aboriginal Syllabics were derived from handwritten Devanagari letters, this abugida indicates vowel sounds by rotations of the letter form, rather than the use of vowel diacritics as is standard in Indic abugidas.) - | Soyombo (Note: May also be derived from Ranjana (see above)) 𑩭 | Sylheti Nagari ꠖ | Gunjala Gondi 𑵸 | Masaram Gondi (Note: Masaram Gondi acts as an Indic abugida, but its letterforms were not derived from any single precursor script.) 𑴝 | Hanuno'o ᜧ

== Character encodings of Da ==
Most Indic scripts are encoded in the Unicode Standard, and as such the letter Da in those scripts can be represented in plain text with unique codepoint. Da from several modern-use scripts can also be found in legacy encodings, such as ISCII.

Character information
| Preview | | | | | ద | | ଦ | | ದ | | ദ | | દ | | ਦ | |
|---|---|---|---|---|---|---|---|---|---|---|---|---|---|---|---|---|
| Unicode name | DEVANAGARI LETTER DA | | BENGALI LETTER DA | | TELUGU LETTER DA | | ORIYA LETTER DA | | KANNADA LETTER DA | | MALAYALAM LETTER DA | | GUJARATI LETTER DA | | GURMUKHI LETTER DA | |
| Encodings | decimal | hex | dec | hex | dec | hex | dec | hex | dec | hex | dec | hex | dec | hex | dec | hex |
| Unicode | 2342 | U+0926 | 2470 | U+09A6 | 3110 | U+0C26 | 2854 | U+0B26 | 3238 | U+0CA6 | 3366 | U+0D26 | 2726 | U+0AA6 | 2598 | U+0A26 |
| UTF-8 | 224 164 166 | E0 A4 A6 | 224 166 166 | E0 A6 A6 | 224 176 166 | E0 B0 A6 | 224 172 166 | E0 AC A6 | 224 178 166 | E0 B2 A6 | 224 180 166 | E0 B4 A6 | 224 170 166 | E0 AA A6 | 224 168 166 | E0 A8 A6 |
| Numeric character reference | &#2342; | &#x926; | &#2470; | &#x9A6; | &#3110; | &#xC26; | &#2854; | &#xB26; | &#3238; | &#xCA6; | &#3366; | &#xD26; | &#2726; | &#xAA6; | &#2598; | &#xA26; |
| ISCII | 196 | C4 | 196 | C4 | 196 | C4 | 196 | C4 | 196 | C4 | 196 | C4 | 196 | C4 | 196 | C4 |

Character information
| Preview | Ashoka Kushana Gupta | | 𐨡 | | | | 𑌦 | |
|---|---|---|---|---|---|---|---|---|
| Unicode name | BRAHMI LETTER DA | | KHAROSHTHI LETTER DA | | SIDDHAM LETTER DA | | GRANTHA LETTER DA | |
| Encodings | decimal | hex | dec | hex | dec | hex | dec | hex |
| Unicode | 69668 | U+11024 | 68129 | U+10A21 | 71071 | U+1159F | 70438 | U+11326 |
| UTF-8 | 240 145 128 164 | F0 91 80 A4 | 240 144 168 161 | F0 90 A8 A1 | 240 145 150 159 | F0 91 96 9F | 240 145 140 166 | F0 91 8C A6 |
| UTF-16 | 55300 56356 | D804 DC24 | 55298 56865 | D802 DE21 | 55301 56735 | D805 DD9F | 55300 57126 | D804 DF26 |
| Numeric character reference | &#69668; | &#x11024; | &#68129; | &#x10A21; | &#71071; | &#x1159F; | &#70438; | &#x11326; |

Character information
| Preview | | | ྡ | | ꡊ | | 𑨛 | | 𑐡 | | 𑰟 | | 𑆢 | |
|---|---|---|---|---|---|---|---|---|---|---|---|---|---|---|
| Unicode name | TIBETAN LETTER DA | | TIBETAN SUBJOINED LETTER DA | | PHAGS-PA LETTER DA | | ZANABAZAR SQUARE LETTER DA | | NEWA LETTER DA | | BHAIKSUKI LETTER DA | | SHARADA LETTER DA | |
| Encodings | decimal | hex | dec | hex | dec | hex | dec | hex | dec | hex | dec | hex | dec | hex |
| Unicode | 3921 | U+0F51 | 4001 | U+0FA1 | 43082 | U+A84A | 72219 | U+11A1B | 70689 | U+11421 | 72735 | U+11C1F | 70050 | U+111A2 |
| UTF-8 | 224 189 145 | E0 BD 91 | 224 190 161 | E0 BE A1 | 234 161 138 | EA A1 8A | 240 145 168 155 | F0 91 A8 9B | 240 145 144 161 | F0 91 90 A1 | 240 145 176 159 | F0 91 B0 9F | 240 145 134 162 | F0 91 86 A2 |
| UTF-16 | 3921 | 0F51 | 4001 | 0FA1 | 43082 | A84A | 55302 56859 | D806 DE1B | 55301 56353 | D805 DC21 | 55303 56351 | D807 DC1F | 55300 56738 | D804 DDA2 |
| Numeric character reference | &#3921; | &#xF51; | &#4001; | &#xFA1; | &#43082; | &#xA84A; | &#72219; | &#x11A1B; | &#70689; | &#x11421; | &#72735; | &#x11C1F; | &#70050; | &#x111A2; |

Character information
| Preview | ဒ | | ᨴ | | ᦑ | |
|---|---|---|---|---|---|---|
| Unicode name | MYANMAR LETTER DA | | TAI THAM LETTER LOW TA | | NEW TAI LUE LETTER LOW TA | |
| Encodings | decimal | hex | dec | hex | dec | hex |
| Unicode | 4114 | U+1012 | 6708 | U+1A34 | 6545 | U+1991 |
| UTF-8 | 225 128 146 | E1 80 92 | 225 168 180 | E1 A8 B4 | 225 166 145 | E1 A6 91 |
| Numeric character reference | &#4114; | &#x1012; | &#6708; | &#x1A34; | &#6545; | &#x1991; |

Character information
| Preview | ទ | | ທ | | ท | | ꪒ | | ꪓ | |
|---|---|---|---|---|---|---|---|---|---|---|
| Unicode name | KHMER LETTER TO | | LAO LETTER THO TAM | | THAI CHARACTER THO THAHAN | | TAI VIET LETTER LOW DO | | TAI VIET LETTER HIGH DO | |
| Encodings | decimal | hex | dec | hex | dec | hex | dec | hex | dec | hex |
| Unicode | 6033 | U+1791 | 3735 | U+0E97 | 3607 | U+0E17 | 43666 | U+AA92 | 43667 | U+AA93 |
| UTF-8 | 225 158 145 | E1 9E 91 | 224 186 151 | E0 BA 97 | 224 184 151 | E0 B8 97 | 234 170 146 | EA AA 92 | 234 170 147 | EA AA 93 |
| Numeric character reference | &#6033; | &#x1791; | &#3735; | &#xE97; | &#3607; | &#xE17; | &#43666; | &#xAA92; | &#43667; | &#xAA93; |

Character information
| Preview | ද | | ꤘ | | 𑄘 | | 𑜓 | | 𑤝 | | ꢣ | | ꨕ | |
|---|---|---|---|---|---|---|---|---|---|---|---|---|---|---|
| Unicode name | SINHALA LETTER ALPAPRAANA DAYANNA | | KAYAH LI LETTER DA | | CHAKMA LETTER DAA | | AHOM LETTER DA | | DIVES AKURU LETTER DA | | SAURASHTRA LETTER DA | | CHAM LETTER DA | |
| Encodings | decimal | hex | dec | hex | dec | hex | dec | hex | dec | hex | dec | hex | dec | hex |
| Unicode | 3503 | U+0DAF | 43288 | U+A918 | 69912 | U+11118 | 71443 | U+11713 | 71965 | U+1191D | 43171 | U+A8A3 | 43541 | U+AA15 |
| UTF-8 | 224 182 175 | E0 B6 AF | 234 164 152 | EA A4 98 | 240 145 132 152 | F0 91 84 98 | 240 145 156 147 | F0 91 9C 93 | 240 145 164 157 | F0 91 A4 9D | 234 162 163 | EA A2 A3 | 234 168 149 | EA A8 95 |
| UTF-16 | 3503 | 0DAF | 43288 | A918 | 55300 56600 | D804 DD18 | 55301 57107 | D805 DF13 | 55302 56605 | D806 DD1D | 43171 | A8A3 | 43541 | AA15 |
| Numeric character reference | &#3503; | &#xDAF; | &#43288; | &#xA918; | &#69912; | &#x11118; | &#71443; | &#x11713; | &#71965; | &#x1191D; | &#43171; | &#xA8A3; | &#43541; | &#xAA15; |

Character information
| Preview | 𑘟 | | 𑦿 | | 𑩭 | | ꠖ | | 𑵸 | | | |
|---|---|---|---|---|---|---|---|---|---|---|---|---|
| Unicode name | MODI LETTER DA | | NANDINAGARI LETTER DA | | SOYOMBO LETTER DA | | SYLOTI NAGRI LETTER DO | | GUNJALA GONDI LETTER DA | | KAITHI LETTER DA | |
| Encodings | decimal | hex | dec | hex | dec | hex | dec | hex | dec | hex | dec | hex |
| Unicode | 71199 | U+1161F | 72127 | U+119BF | 72301 | U+11A6D | 43030 | U+A816 | 73080 | U+11D78 | 69792 | U+110A0 |
| UTF-8 | 240 145 152 159 | F0 91 98 9F | 240 145 166 191 | F0 91 A6 BF | 240 145 169 173 | F0 91 A9 AD | 234 160 150 | EA A0 96 | 240 145 181 184 | F0 91 B5 B8 | 240 145 130 160 | F0 91 82 A0 |
| UTF-16 | 55301 56863 | D805 DE1F | 55302 56767 | D806 DDBF | 55302 56941 | D806 DE6D | 43030 | A816 | 55303 56696 | D807 DD78 | 55300 56480 | D804 DCA0 |
| Numeric character reference | &#71199; | &#x1161F; | &#72127; | &#x119BF; | &#72301; | &#x11A6D; | &#43030; | &#xA816; | &#73080; | &#x11D78; | &#69792; | &#x110A0; |

Character information
| Preview | 𑒠 | | ᰌ | | ᤍ | | ꯗ | | 𑱼 | |
|---|---|---|---|---|---|---|---|---|---|---|
| Unicode name | TIRHUTA LETTER DA | | LEPCHA LETTER DA | | LIMBU LETTER DA | | MEETEI MAYEK LETTER DIL | | MARCHEN LETTER DA | |
| Encodings | decimal | hex | dec | hex | dec | hex | dec | hex | dec | hex |
| Unicode | 70816 | U+114A0 | 7180 | U+1C0C | 6413 | U+190D | 43991 | U+ABD7 | 72828 | U+11C7C |
| UTF-8 | 240 145 146 160 | F0 91 92 A0 | 225 176 140 | E1 B0 8C | 225 164 141 | E1 A4 8D | 234 175 151 | EA AF 97 | 240 145 177 188 | F0 91 B1 BC |
| UTF-16 | 55301 56480 | D805 DCA0 | 7180 | 1C0C | 6413 | 190D | 43991 | ABD7 | 55303 56444 | D807 DC7C |
| Numeric character reference | &#70816; | &#x114A0; | &#7180; | &#x1C0C; | &#6413; | &#x190D; | &#43991; | &#xABD7; | &#72828; | &#x11C7C; |

Character information
| Preview | 𑚛 | | 𑠛 | | 𑈛 | | 𑋏 | | 𑅥 | | 𑊘 | |
|---|---|---|---|---|---|---|---|---|---|---|---|---|
| Unicode name | TAKRI LETTER DA | | DOGRA LETTER DA | | KHOJKI LETTER DA | | KHUDAWADI LETTER DA | | MAHAJANI LETTER DA | | MULTANI LETTER DA | |
| Encodings | decimal | hex | dec | hex | dec | hex | dec | hex | dec | hex | dec | hex |
| Unicode | 71323 | U+1169B | 71707 | U+1181B | 70171 | U+1121B | 70351 | U+112CF | 69989 | U+11165 | 70296 | U+11298 |
| UTF-8 | 240 145 154 155 | F0 91 9A 9B | 240 145 160 155 | F0 91 A0 9B | 240 145 136 155 | F0 91 88 9B | 240 145 139 143 | F0 91 8B 8F | 240 145 133 165 | F0 91 85 A5 | 240 145 138 152 | F0 91 8A 98 |
| UTF-16 | 55301 56987 | D805 DE9B | 55302 56347 | D806 DC1B | 55300 56859 | D804 DE1B | 55300 57039 | D804 DECF | 55300 56677 | D804 DD65 | 55300 56984 | D804 DE98 |
| Numeric character reference | &#71323; | &#x1169B; | &#71707; | &#x1181B; | &#70171; | &#x1121B; | &#70351; | &#x112CF; | &#69989; | &#x11165; | &#70296; | &#x11298; |

Character information
| Preview | ᬤ | | ᯑ | | ᨉ | | ꦢ | | 𑻧 | | ꤴ | | ᮓ | |
|---|---|---|---|---|---|---|---|---|---|---|---|---|---|---|
| Unicode name | BALINESE LETTER DA | | BATAK LETTER DA | | BUGINESE LETTER DA | | JAVANESE LETTER DA | | MAKASAR LETTER DA | | REJANG LETTER DA | | SUNDANESE LETTER DA | |
| Encodings | decimal | hex | dec | hex | dec | hex | dec | hex | dec | hex | dec | hex | dec | hex |
| Unicode | 6948 | U+1B24 | 7121 | U+1BD1 | 6665 | U+1A09 | 43426 | U+A9A2 | 73447 | U+11EE7 | 43316 | U+A934 | 7059 | U+1B93 |
| UTF-8 | 225 172 164 | E1 AC A4 | 225 175 145 | E1 AF 91 | 225 168 137 | E1 A8 89 | 234 166 162 | EA A6 A2 | 240 145 187 167 | F0 91 BB A7 | 234 164 180 | EA A4 B4 | 225 174 147 | E1 AE 93 |
| UTF-16 | 6948 | 1B24 | 7121 | 1BD1 | 6665 | 1A09 | 43426 | A9A2 | 55303 57063 | D807 DEE7 | 43316 | A934 | 7059 | 1B93 |
| Numeric character reference | &#6948; | &#x1B24; | &#7121; | &#x1BD1; | &#6665; | &#x1A09; | &#43426; | &#xA9A2; | &#73447; | &#x11EE7; | &#43316; | &#xA934; | &#7059; | &#x1B93; |

Character information
| Preview | ᜇ | | ᝧ | | ᝇ | | ᜧ | | 𑴝 | |
|---|---|---|---|---|---|---|---|---|---|---|
| Unicode name | TAGALOG LETTER DA | | TAGBANWA LETTER DA | | BUHID LETTER DA | | HANUNOO LETTER DA | | MASARAM GONDI LETTER DA | |
| Encodings | decimal | hex | dec | hex | dec | hex | dec | hex | dec | hex |
| Unicode | 5895 | U+1707 | 5991 | U+1767 | 5959 | U+1747 | 5927 | U+1727 | 72989 | U+11D1D |
| UTF-8 | 225 156 135 | E1 9C 87 | 225 157 167 | E1 9D A7 | 225 157 135 | E1 9D 87 | 225 156 167 | E1 9C A7 | 240 145 180 157 | F0 91 B4 9D |
| UTF-16 | 5895 | 1707 | 5991 | 1767 | 5959 | 1747 | 5927 | 1727 | 55303 56605 | D807 DD1D |
| Numeric character reference | &#5895; | &#x1707; | &#5991; | &#x1767; | &#5959; | &#x1747; | &#5927; | &#x1727; | &#72989; | &#x11D1D; |
