= Sa (Indic) =

Letter "Sa" in Indic scripts

Example glyphs
- Meitei: Sa
- Bengali–Assamese: Sa
- Tibetan: Sa
- Tamil: ஸ
- Thai: ส
- Malayalam: സ
- Sinhala: ස
- Ashoka Brahmi: Sa
- Devanagari: Sa

Cognates
- Hebrew: ס
- Greek: Ξ
- Cyrillic: Ѯ

Properties
- Phonemic representation: /s/
- IAST transliteration: s S
- ISCII code point: D7 (215)

Sa is a consonant of Indic abugidas. In modern Indic scripts, Sa is derived from the early "Ashoka" Brahmi letter after having gone through the Gupta letter.

== Āryabhaṭa numeration ==
Aryabhata used Devanagari letters for numbers, very similar to the Greek numerals, even after the invention of Indian numerals. The values of the different forms of स are:

- स [sɐ] = 90 (९०)
- सि [si] = 9,000 (९ ०००)
- सु [su] = 900,000 (९ ०० ०००)
- सृ [sr̩] = 90,000,000 (९ ०० ०० ०००)
- सॢ [sl̩] = 9×10^{9} (९×१०^{९})
- से [seː] = 9×10^{11} (९×१०^{११})
- सै [sɐi̯] = 9×10^{13} (९×१०^{१३})
- सो [soː] = 9×10^{15} (९×१०^{१५})
- सौ [sɐu̯] = 9×10^{17} (९×१०^{१७})

== Historic Sa ==
There are three different general early historic scripts - Brahmi and its variants, Kharoṣṭhī, and Tocharian, the so-called slanting Brahmi. Sa as found in standard Brahmi, was a simple geometric shape, with variations toward more flowing forms by the Gupta. The Tocharian Sa had an alternate Fremdzeichen form,. The third form of sa, in Kharoshthi was probably derived from Aramaic separately from the Brahmi letter.

=== Brahmi Sa ===
The Brahmi letter, Sa, is probably derived from the altered Aramaic Samekh, and is thus related to the modern Greek Xi. Several identifiable styles of writing the Brahmi Sa can be found, most associated with a specific set of inscriptions from an artifact or diverse records from an historic period. As the earliest and most geometric style of Brahmi, the letters found on the Edicts of Ashoka and other records from around that time are normally the reference form for Brahmi letters, with vowel marks not attested until later forms of Brahmi back-formed to match the geometric writing style.

Brahmi Sa historic forms
Ashoka (3rd-1st c. BCE)	Girnar (~150 BCE)	Kushana (~150-250 CE)	Gujarat (~250 CE)	Gupta (~350 CE)

=== Tocharian Sa ===
The Tocharian letter is derived from the Brahmi, and has an alternate Fremdzeichen form used in conjuncts and as an alternate representation of Sä.

Tocharian Sa with vowel marks
Sa	Sā	Si	Sī	Su	Sū	Sr	Sr̄	Se	Sai	So	Sau	Sä	Fremdzeichen

=== Kharoṣṭhī Sa ===
The Kharoṣṭhī letter is generally accepted as being derived from the altered Aramaic Samekh, and is thus related to Xi, in addition to the Brahmi Sa.

== Devanagari Sa ==
Sa (स) is a consonant of the Devanagari abugida. It ultimately arose from the Brahmi letter, after having gone through the Gupta letter. Letters that derive from it are the Gujarati letter સ, and the Modi letter 𑘭.

=== Devanagari-using Languages ===
In all languages, स is pronounced as [sə] or [s] when appropriate. Like all Indic scripts, Devanagari uses vowel marks attached to the base consonant to override the inherent /ə/ vowel:

Devanagari स with vowel marks
Sa	Sā	Si	Sī	Su	Sū	Sr	Sr̄	Sl	Sl̄	Se	Sai	So	Sau	S
स	सा	सि	सी	सु	सू	सृ	सॄ	सॢ	सॣ	से	सै	सो	सौ	स्

=== Conjuncts with स ===
Half form of Sa.

Devanagari exhibits conjunct ligatures, as is common in Indic scripts. In modern Devanagari texts, most conjuncts are formed by reducing the letter shape to fit tightly to the following letter, usually by dropping a character's vertical stem, sometimes referred to as a "half form". Some conjunct clusters are always represented by a true ligature, instead of a shape that can be broken into constituent independent letters. Vertically stacked conjuncts are ubiquitous in older texts, while only a few are still used routinely in modern Devanagari texts. The use of ligatures and vertical conjuncts may vary across languages using the Devanagari script, with Marathi in particular preferring the use of half forms where texts in other languages would show ligatures and vertical stacks.

==== Ligature conjuncts of स ====
True ligatures are quite rare in Indic scripts. The most common ligated conjuncts in Devanagari are in the form of a slight mutation to fit in context or as a consistent variant form appended to the adjacent characters. Those variants include Na and the Repha and Rakar forms of Ra. Nepali and Marathi texts use the "eyelash" Ra half form for an initial "R" instead of repha.

- Repha र্ (r) + स (sa) gives the ligature rsa: ^{note}

- Eyelash र্ (r) + स (sa) gives the ligature rsa:

- स্ (s) + rakar र (ra) gives the ligature sra:

==== Stacked conjuncts of स ====
Vertically stacked ligatures are the most common conjunct forms found in Devanagari text. Although the constituent characters may need to be stretched and moved slightly in order to stack neatly, stacked conjuncts can be broken down into recognizable base letters, or a letter and an otherwise standard ligature.

- छ্ (c^{h}) + स (sa) gives the ligature c^{h}sa:

- ढ্ (ḍʱ) + स (sa) gives the ligature ḍʱsa:

- ड্ (ḍ) + स (sa) gives the ligature ḍsa:

- द্ (d) + स (sa) gives the ligature dsa:

- ङ্ (ŋ) + स (sa) gives the ligature ŋsa:

- Repha र্ (r) + स্ (s) + व (va) gives the ligature rsva:

- स্ (s) + ब (ba) gives the ligature sba:

- स্ (s) + च (ca) gives the ligature sca:

- स্ (s) + ज (ja) gives the ligature sja:

- स্ (s) + ज্ (j) + ञ (ña) gives the ligature sjña:

- स্ (s) + ल (la) gives the ligature sla:

- स্ (s) + न (na) gives the ligature sna:

- स্ (s) + ञ (ña) gives the ligature sña:

- स্ (s) + व (va) gives the ligature sva:

- ठ্ (ṭ^{h}) + स (sa) gives the ligature ṭ^{h}sa:

- ट্ (ṭ) + स (sa) gives the ligature ṭsa:

== Bengali Sa ==
The Bengali script স is derived from the Siddhaṃ, and is marked by a similar horizontal head line, but less geometric shape, than its Devanagari counterpart, स. The inherent vowel of Bengali consonant letters is /ɔ/, so the bare letter স will sometimes be transliterated as "so" instead of "sa". Adding okar, the "o" vowel mark, gives a reading of /so/. Like all Indic consonants, স can be modified by marks to indicate another (or no) vowel than its inherent "a".

Bengali স with vowel marks
sa	sā	si	sī	su	sū	sr	sr̄	se	sai	so	sau	s
স	সা	সি	সী	সু	সূ	সৃ	সৄ	সে	সৈ	সো	সৌ	স্

=== স in Bengali-using languages ===
স is used as a basic consonant character in all of the major Bengali script orthographies, including Bengali and Assamese. However, the usual pronunciation of this letter is very different in both languages, /ʃ/ in Bengali and /x/ in Assamese.

=== Conjuncts with স ===
Bengali স exhibits conjunct ligatures, as is common in Indic scripts, with a tendency towards stacked ligatures.

- ক্ (k) + স (sa) gives the ligature ksa:

- প্ (p) + স (sa) gives the ligature psa:

- র্ (r) + স (sa) gives the ligature rsa, with the repha prefix:

- স্ (s) + ক (ka) gives the ligature ska:

- স্ (s) + খ (k^{h}a) gives the ligature sk^{h}a:

- স্ (s) + ক্ (k) + র (ra) gives the ligature skra, with the ra phala suffix:

- স্ (s) + ল (la) gives the ligature sla:

- স্ (s) + ম (ma) gives the ligature sma:

- স্ (s) + ন (na) gives the ligature sna:

- স্ (s) + প (pa) gives the ligature spa:

- স্ (s) + ফ (p^{h}a) gives the ligature sp^{h}a:

- স্ (s) + প্ (p) + ল (la) gives the ligature spla:

- স্ (s) + র (ra) gives the ligature sra, with the ra phala suffix:

- স্ (s) + ত (ta) gives the ligature sta:

- স্ (s) + থ (t^{h}a) gives the ligature st^{h}a:

- স্ (s) + থ্ (t^{h}) + য (ya) gives the ligature st^{h}ya, with the ya phala suffix:

- স্ (s) + ত্ (t) + র (ra) gives the ligature stra, with the ra phala suffix:

- স্ (s) + ট (ṭa) gives the ligature sṭa:

- স্ (s) + ট্ (ṭ) + র (ra) gives the ligature sṭra, with the ra phala suffix:

- স্ (s) + ত্ (t) + ব (va) gives the ligature stva, with the va phala suffix:

- স্ (s) + ত্ (t) + য (ya) gives the ligature stya, with the ya phala suffix:

- স্ (s) + ব (va) gives the ligature sva, with the va phala suffix:

- স্ (s) + য (ya) gives the ligature sya, with the ya phala suffix:

- ত্ (t) + স (sa) gives the ligature tsa:

== Gujarati Sa ==
Gujarati Sa.

Sa (સ) is the thirty-second consonant of the Gujarati abugida. It is derived from the Devanagari Sa with the top bar (shiro rekha) removed, and ultimately the Brahmi letter.

=== Gujarati-using Languages ===
The Gujarati script is used to write the Gujarati and Kutchi languages. In both languages, સ is pronounced as [sə] or [s] when appropriate. Like all Indic scripts, Gujarati uses vowel marks attached to the base consonant to override the inherent /ə/ vowel:

Sa	Sā	Si	Sī	Su	Sū	Sr	Sl	Sr̄	Sl̄	Sĕ	Se	Sai	Sŏ	So	Sau	S
Gujarati Sa syllables, with vowel marks in red.

=== Conjuncts with સ ===
Half form of Sa.

Gujarati સ exhibits conjunct ligatures, much like its parent Devanagari Script. Most Gujarati conjuncts can only be formed by reducing the letter shape to fit tightly to the following letter, usually by dropping a character's vertical stem, sometimes referred to as a "half form". A few conjunct clusters can be represented by a true ligature, instead of a shape that can be broken into constituent independent letters, and vertically stacked conjuncts can also be found in Gujarati, although much less commonly than in Devanagari. True ligatures are quite rare in Indic scripts. The most common ligated conjuncts in Gujarati are in the form of a slight mutation to fit in context or as a consistent variant form appended to the adjacent characters. Those variants include Na and the Repha and Rakar forms of Ra.

- ર્ (r) + સ (sa) gives the ligature RSa:

- સ્ (s) + ર (ra) gives the ligature SRa:

== Telugu Sa ==
Telugu independent and subjoined Sa.

Sa (స) is a consonant of the Telugu abugida. It ultimately arose from the Brahmi letter. It is closely related to the Kannada letter ಸ. Most Telugu consonants contain a v-shaped headstroke that is related to the horizontal headline found in other Indic scripts, although headstrokes do not connect adjacent letters in Telugu. The headstroke is normally lost when adding vowel matras. Telugu conjuncts are created by reducing trailing letters to a subjoined form that appears below the initial consonant of the conjunct. Many subjoined forms are created by dropping their headline, with many extending the end of the stroke of the main letter body to form an extended tail reaching up to the right of the preceding consonant. This subjoining of trailing letters to create conjuncts is in contrast to the leading half forms of Devanagari and Bengali letters. Ligature conjuncts are not a feature in Telugu, with the only non-standard construction being an alternate subjoined form of Ṣa (borrowed from Kannada) in the KṢa conjunct.

== Malayalam Sa ==
Malayalam letter Sa

Sa (സ) is a consonant of the Malayalam abugida. It ultimately arose from the Brahmi letter, via the Grantha letter Sa. Like in other Indic scripts, Malayalam consonants have the inherent vowel "a", and take one of several modifying vowel signs to represent syllables with another vowel or no vowel at all.

Malayalam Sa matras: Sa, Sā, Si, Sī, Su, Sū, Sr̥, Sr̥̄, Sl̥, Sl̥̄, Se, Sē, Sai, So, Sō, Sau, and S.

=== Conjuncts of സ ===
As is common in Indic scripts, Malayalam joins letters together to form conjunct consonant clusters. There are several ways in which conjuncts are formed in Malayalam texts: using a post-base form of a trailing consonant placed under the initial consonant of a conjunct, a combined ligature of two or more consonants joined together, a conjoining form that appears as a combining mark on the rest of the conjunct, the use of an explicit candrakkala mark to suppress the inherent "a" vowel, or a special consonant form called a "chillu" letter, representing a bare consonant without the inherent "a" vowel. Texts written with the modern reformed Malayalam orthography, put̪iya lipi, may favor more regular conjunct forms than older texts in paḻaya lipi, due to changes undertaken in the 1970s by the Government of Kerala.

- സ് (s) + ത (ta) gives the ligature sta:

- സ് (s) + ഥ (t^{h}a) gives the ligature st^{h}a:

- സ് (s) + ന (na) gives the ligature sna:

- സ് (s) + പ (pa) gives the ligature spa:

- സ് (s) + മ (ma) gives the ligature sma:

- ക് (k) + സ (sa) gives the ligature ksa:

- ത് (t) + സ (sa) gives the ligature tsa:

- പ് (p) + സ (sa) gives the ligature psa:

- സ് (s) + സ (sa) gives the ligature ssa:

== Canadian Aboriginal Syllabics Se ==
ᓭ, ᓯ, ᓱ and ᓴ are the base characters "Se", "Si", "So" and "Sa" in the Canadian Aboriginal Syllabics. The bare consonant ᔅ (S) is a small version of the A-series letter ᓴ, although the letter ᐢ, derived from Pitman shorthand was the original bare consonant symbol for S. The character ᓭ is derived from a handwritten form of the Devanagari letter स, without the headline or vertical stem, and the forms for different vowels are derived by mirroring. Unlike most writing systems without legacy computer encodings, complex Canadian syllabic letters are represented in Unicode with pre-composed characters, rather than with base characters and diacritical marks.

Variant	E-series		I-series		O-series		A-series			Other
S + vowel	ᓭ		ᓯ		ᓱ		ᓴ			-
S + vowel	Se		Si		So		Sa			-
Small	-		ᣚ		ᔇ		ᔅ			ᐢ
Small	-		Ojibway S		Sw		S			Algonquian S
S with long vowels	-		ᓰ		ᓲ	ᓳ	ᓵ			-
S with long vowels	-		Sī		Sō	Cree Sō	Sā			-
S + W-vowels	ᓶ	ᓷ	ᓸ	ᓹ	ᓼ	ᓽ	ᔀ		ᔁ	ᔋ
S + W-vowels	Swe	Cree Swe	Swi	Cree Swi	Swo	Cree Swo	Swa		Cree Swa	Naskapi Sw
S + long W-vowels	-		ᓺ	ᓻ	ᓾ	ᓿ	ᔂ	ᔄ	ᔃ	-
S + long W-vowels	-		Swī	Cree Swī	Swō	Cree Swō	Swā	Naskapi Swā	Cree Swā	-
S with ring diacritics	-		ᓮ		ᢾ		ᢿ			-
S with ring diacritics	-		Sāi		Soy		Say			-
Naskapi compound letters	ᔌ		ᔍ		ᔏ		ᔎ			ᔊ
Naskapi compound letters	Spwa		Stwa		Scwa		Skwa			Skw

== Odia Sa ==
Odia independent and subjoined letter Sa.

Sa (ସ) is a consonant of the Odia abugida. It ultimately arose from the Brahmi letter, via the Siddhaṃ letter Sa. Like in other Indic scripts, Odia consonants have the inherent vowel "a", and take one of several modifying vowel signs to represent syllables with another vowel or no vowel at all.

Odia Sa with vowel matras
Sa	Sā	Si	Sī	Su	Sū	Sr̥	Sr̥̄	Sl̥	Sl̥̄	Se	Sai	So	Sau	S
ସ	ସା	ସି	ସୀ	ସୁ	ସୂ	ସୃ	ସୄ	ସୢ	ସୣ	ସେ	ସୈ	ସୋ	ସୌ	ସ୍

=== Conjuncts of ସ ===
As is common in Indic scripts, Odia joins letters together to form conjunct consonant clusters. The most common conjunct formation is achieved by using a small subjoined form of trailing consonants. Most consonants' subjoined forms are identical to the full form, just reduced in size, although a few drop the curved headline or have a subjoined form not directly related to the full form of the consonant. The second type of conjunct formation is through pure ligatures, where the constituent consonants are written together in a single graphic form. This ligature may be recognizable as being a combination of two characters or it can have a conjunct ligature unrelated to its constituent characters.

- ତ୍ (t) + ସ (sa) gives the ligature tsa:

== Kaithi Sa ==
Kaithi consonant and half-form Sa.

Sa (𑂮) is a consonant of the Kaithi abugida. It ultimately arose from the Brahmi letter, via the Siddhaṃ letter Sa. Like in other Indic scripts, Kaithi consonants have the inherent vowel "a", and take one of several modifying vowel signs to represent syllables with another vowel or no vowel at all.

Kaithi Sa with vowel matras
Sa	Sā	Si	Sī	Su	Sū	Se	Sai	So	Sau	S
𑂮	𑂮𑂰	𑂮𑂱	𑂮𑂲	𑂮𑂳	𑂮𑂴	𑂮𑂵	𑂮𑂶	𑂮𑂷	𑂮𑂸	𑂮𑂹

=== Conjuncts of 𑂮 ===
As is common in Indic scripts, Kaithi joins letters together to form conjunct consonant clusters. The most common conjunct formation is achieved by using a half form of preceding consonants, although several consonants use an explicit virama. Most half forms are derived from the full form by removing the vertical stem. As is common in most Indic scripts, conjuncts of ra are indicated with a repha or rakar mark attached to the rest of the consonant cluster. In addition, there are a few vertical conjuncts that can be found in Kaithi writing, but true ligatures are not used in the modern Kaithi script.

- 𑂮୍ (s) + 𑂩 (ra) gives the ligature sra:

- 𑂩୍ (r) + 𑂮 (sa) gives the ligature rsa:

== Tirhuta Sa ==
Tirhuta consonant Sa

Sa (𑒮) is a consonant of the Tirhuta abugida. It ultimately arose from the Brahmi letter, via the Siddhaṃ letter Sa. Like in other Indic scripts, Tirhuta consonants have the inherent vowel "a", and take one of several modifying vowel signs to represent sylables with another vowel or no vowel at all.

Tirhuta Sa with vowel matras
Sa	Sā	Si	Sī	Su	Sū	Sṛ	Sṝ	Sḷ	Sḹ	Sē	Se	Sai	Sō	So	Sau	S
𑒮	𑒮𑒰	𑒮𑒱	𑒮𑒲	𑒮𑒳	𑒮𑒴	𑒮𑒵	𑒮𑒶	𑒮𑒷	𑒮𑒸	𑒮𑒹	𑒮𑒺	𑒮𑒻	𑒮𑒼	𑒮𑒽	𑒮𑒾	𑒮𑓂

=== Conjuncts of 𑒮 ===
As is common in Indic scripts, Tirhuta joins letters together to form conjunct consonant clusters. The most common conjunct formation is achieved by using an explicit virama. As is common in most Indic scripts, conjuncts of ra are indicated with a repha or rakar mark attached to the rest of the consonant cluster. In addition, other consonants take unique combining forms when in conjunct with other letters, and there are several vertical conjuncts and true ligatures that can be found in Tirhuta writing.

- 𑒩୍ (r) + 𑒮 (sa) gives the ligature rsa:

- 𑒮୍ (s) + 𑒢 (na) gives the ligature sna:

- 𑒮୍ (s) + 𑒩 (ra) gives the ligature sra:

- 𑒮୍ (s) + 𑒞 (ta) gives the ligature sta:

- 𑒮 (s) + 𑒅 (u) gives the ligature su:

- 𑒮୍ (s) + 𑒫 (va) gives the ligature sva:

- 𑒮୍ (s) + 𑒨 (ya) gives the ligature sya:

- 𑒞୍ (t) + 𑒮 (sa) gives the ligature tsa:

== Comparison of Sa ==
The various Indic scripts are generally related to each other through adaptation and borrowing, and as such the glyphs for cognate letters, including Sa, are related as well.

Comparison of Sa in different scripts

Aramaic
Kharoṣṭhī 𐨯	Ashoka Brahmi	Kushana Brahmi (Note: The middle "Kushana" form of Brahmi is a later style that emerged as Brahmi scripts were beginning to proliferate. Gupta Brahmi was definitely a stylistic descendant from Kushana, but other Brahmi-derived scripts may have descended from earlier forms.)	Tocharian (Note: Tocharian is probably derived from the middle period "Kushana" form of Brahmi, although artifacts from that time are not plentiful enough to establish a definite succession.) /
Gupta Brahmi	Pallava
Kadamba -
Bhaiksuki 𑰭	Siddhaṃ	Grantha 𑌸	Cham ꨧ
Sinhala ස	Pyu / Old Mon (Note: Pyu and Old Mon are probably the precursors of the Burmese script, and may be derived from either the Pallava or Kadamba script) -
Tibetan	Newa 𑐳	Ahom 𑜏	Malayalam സ
Telugu స	Burmese သ
Lepcha ᰠ	Ranjana	Saurashtra ꢱ	Dives Akuru 𑤬
Kannada ಸ	Kayah Li ꤎ
Limbu ᤛ	Soyombo (Note: May also be derived from Devangari (see bottom left of table)) 𑪁	Khmer ស	Tamil ஸ
Chakma 𑄥	Tai Tham ᩈ
Meitei Mayek ꯁ	Gaudi -	Thai ส	Lao ສ
Tai Le ᥔ
Marchen 𑲍	Tirhuta 𑒮	New Tai Lue ᦉ	Tai Viet ꪎ / ꪏ	Aksara Kawi
'Phags-pa ꡛ	Odia ସ	Sharada 𑆱	Rejang ꤼ	Batak ᯘ	Buginese ᨔ
Zanabazar Square 𑨰	Bengali–Assamese	Takri 𑚨	Javanese ꦱ	Balinese ᬲ	Makasar 𑻰
Hangul (Note: The Origin of Hangul from 'Phags-pa is one of limited influence, inspiring at most a few basic letter shapes. Hangul does not function as an Indic abugida.) -	Northern Nagari -	Dogri 𑠩	Laṇḍā -	Sundanese ᮞ	Baybayin ᜐ
Modi 𑘭	Gujarati સ	Khojki 𑈩	Khudabadi 𑋝	Mahajani 𑅰	Tagbanwa ᝰ
Devanagari	Nandinagari 𑧍	Kaithi 𑂮	Gurmukhi ਸ	Multani 𑊥	Buhid ᝐ
Canadian Syllabics (Note: Although the basic letter forms of the Canadian Aboriginal Syllabics were derived from handwritten Devanagari letters, this abugida indicates vowel sounds by rotations of the letter form, rather than the use of vowel diacritics as is standard in Indic abugidas.) ᓭ	Soyombo (Note: May also be derived from Ranjana (see above)) 𑪁	Sylheti Nagari ꠡ	Gunjala Gondi 𑶉	Masaram Gondi (Note: Masaram Gondi acts as an Indic abugida, but its letterforms were not derived from any single precursor script.) 𑴫	Hanuno'o ᜰ

== Character encodings of Sa ==
Most Indic scripts are encoded in the Unicode Standard, and as such the letter Sa in those scripts can be represented in plain text with unique codepoint. Sa from several modern-use scripts can also be found in legacy encodings, such as ISCII.

Character information
Preview					ஸ		స		ସ		ಸ		സ		સ		ਸ	
Unicode name	DEVANAGARI LETTER SA		BENGALI LETTER SA		TAMIL LETTER SA		TELUGU LETTER SA		ORIYA LETTER SA		KANNADA LETTER SA		MALAYALAM LETTER SA		GUJARATI LETTER SA		GURMUKHI LETTER SA	
Encodings	decimal	hex	dec	hex	dec	hex	dec	hex	dec	hex	dec	hex	dec	hex	dec	hex	dec	hex
Unicode	2360	U+0938	2488	U+09B8	3000	U+0BB8	3128	U+0C38	2872	U+0B38	3256	U+0CB8	3384	U+0D38	2744	U+0AB8	2616	U+0A38
UTF-8	224 164 184	E0 A4 B8	224 166 184	E0 A6 B8	224 174 184	E0 AE B8	224 176 184	E0 B0 B8	224 172 184	E0 AC B8	224 178 184	E0 B2 B8	224 180 184	E0 B4 B8	224 170 184	E0 AA B8	224 168 184	E0 A8 B8
Numeric character reference	&#2360;	&#x938;	&#2488;	&#x9B8;	&#3000;	&#xBB8;	&#3128;	&#xC38;	&#2872;	&#xB38;	&#3256;	&#xCB8;	&#3384;	&#xD38;	&#2744;	&#xAB8;	&#2616;	&#xA38;
ISCII	215	D7	215	D7	215	D7	215	D7	215	D7	215	D7	215	D7	215	D7	215	D7

Character information
Preview	Ashoka Kushana Gupta		𐨯				𑌸	
Unicode name	BRAHMI LETTER SA		KHAROSHTHI LETTER SA		SIDDHAM LETTER SA		GRANTHA LETTER SA	
Encodings	decimal	hex	dec	hex	dec	hex	dec	hex
Unicode	69682	U+11032	68143	U+10A2F	71085	U+115AD	70456	U+11338
UTF-8	240 145 128 178	F0 91 80 B2	240 144 168 175	F0 90 A8 AF	240 145 150 173	F0 91 96 AD	240 145 140 184	F0 91 8C B8
UTF-16	55300 56370	D804 DC32	55298 56879	D802 DE2F	55301 56749	D805 DDAD	55300 57144	D804 DF38
Numeric character reference	&#69682;	&#x11032;	&#68143;	&#x10A2F;	&#71085;	&#x115AD;	&#70456;	&#x11338;

Character information
Preview			ྶ		ꡛ		𑨰		𑐳		𑰭		𑆱	
Unicode name	TIBETAN LETTER SA		TIBETAN SUBJOINED LETTER SA		PHAGS-PA LETTER SA		ZANABAZAR SQUARE LETTER SA		NEWA LETTER SA		BHAIKSUKI LETTER SA		SHARADA LETTER SA	
Encodings	decimal	hex	dec	hex	dec	hex	dec	hex	dec	hex	dec	hex	dec	hex
Unicode	3942	U+0F66	4022	U+0FB6	43099	U+A85B	72240	U+11A30	70707	U+11433	72749	U+11C2D	70065	U+111B1
UTF-8	224 189 166	E0 BD A6	224 190 182	E0 BE B6	234 161 155	EA A1 9B	240 145 168 176	F0 91 A8 B0	240 145 144 179	F0 91 90 B3	240 145 176 173	F0 91 B0 AD	240 145 134 177	F0 91 86 B1
UTF-16	3942	0F66	4022	0FB6	43099	A85B	55302 56880	D806 DE30	55301 56371	D805 DC33	55303 56365	D807 DC2D	55300 56753	D804 DDB1
Numeric character reference	&#3942;	&#xF66;	&#4022;	&#xFB6;	&#43099;	&#xA85B;	&#72240;	&#x11A30;	&#70707;	&#x11433;	&#72749;	&#x11C2D;	&#70065;	&#x111B1;

Character information
Preview	သ		ဿ		ᩈ		ᩞ		ᩔ		ᦉ	
Unicode name	MYANMAR LETTER SA		MYANMAR LETTER GREAT SA		TAI THAM LETTER HIGH SA		TAI THAM CONSONANT SIGN SA		TAI THAM LETTER GREAT SA		NEW TAI LUE LETTER HIGH SA	
Encodings	decimal	hex	dec	hex	dec	hex	dec	hex	dec	hex	dec	hex
Unicode	4126	U+101E	4159	U+103F	6728	U+1A48	6750	U+1A5E	6740	U+1A54	6537	U+1989
UTF-8	225 128 158	E1 80 9E	225 128 191	E1 80 BF	225 169 136	E1 A9 88	225 169 158	E1 A9 9E	225 169 148	E1 A9 94	225 166 137	E1 A6 89
Numeric character reference	&#4126;	&#x101E;	&#4159;	&#x103F;	&#6728;	&#x1A48;	&#6750;	&#x1A5E;	&#6740;	&#x1A54;	&#6537;	&#x1989;

Character information
Preview	ស		ສ		ส		ꪎ		ꪏ	
Unicode name	KHMER LETTER SA		LAO LETTER SO SUNG		THAI CHARACTER SO SUA		TAI VIET LETTER LOW SO		TAI VIET LETTER HIGH SO	
Encodings	decimal	hex	dec	hex	dec	hex	dec	hex	dec	hex
Unicode	6047	U+179F	3754	U+0EAA	3626	U+0E2A	43662	U+AA8E	43663	U+AA8F
UTF-8	225 158 159	E1 9E 9F	224 186 170	E0 BA AA	224 184 170	E0 B8 AA	234 170 142	EA AA 8E	234 170 143	EA AA 8F
Numeric character reference	&#6047;	&#x179F;	&#3754;	&#xEAA;	&#3626;	&#xE2A;	&#43662;	&#xAA8E;	&#43663;	&#xAA8F;

Character information
Preview	ස		ꤎ		𑄥		ᥔ		𑜏		𑤬		ꢱ		ꨧ	
Unicode name	SINHALA LETTER DANTAJA SAYANNA		KAYAH LI LETTER SA		CHAKMA LETTER SAA		TAI LE LETTER SA		AHOM LETTER SA		DIVES AKURU LETTER SA		SAURASHTRA LETTER SA		CHAM LETTER SA	
Encodings	decimal	hex	dec	hex	dec	hex	dec	hex	dec	hex	dec	hex	dec	hex	dec	hex
Unicode	3523	U+0DC3	43278	U+A90E	69925	U+11125	6484	U+1954	71439	U+1170F	71980	U+1192C	43185	U+A8B1	43559	U+AA27
UTF-8	224 183 131	E0 B7 83	234 164 142	EA A4 8E	240 145 132 165	F0 91 84 A5	225 165 148	E1 A5 94	240 145 156 143	F0 91 9C 8F	240 145 164 172	F0 91 A4 AC	234 162 177	EA A2 B1	234 168 167	EA A8 A7
UTF-16	3523	0DC3	43278	A90E	55300 56613	D804 DD25	6484	1954	55301 57103	D805 DF0F	55302 56620	D806 DD2C	43185	A8B1	43559	AA27
Numeric character reference	&#3523;	&#xDC3;	&#43278;	&#xA90E;	&#69925;	&#x11125;	&#6484;	&#x1954;	&#71439;	&#x1170F;	&#71980;	&#x1192C;	&#43185;	&#xA8B1;	&#43559;	&#xAA27;

Character information
Preview	𑘭		𑧍		𑪁		ꠡ		𑶉		𑂮	
Unicode name	MODI LETTER SA		NANDINAGARI LETTER SA		SOYOMBO LETTER SA		SYLOTI NAGRI LETTER SO		GUNJALA GONDI LETTER SA		KAITHI LETTER SA	
Encodings	decimal	hex	dec	hex	dec	hex	dec	hex	dec	hex	dec	hex
Unicode	71213	U+1162D	72141	U+119CD	72321	U+11A81	43041	U+A821	73097	U+11D89	69806	U+110AE
UTF-8	240 145 152 173	F0 91 98 AD	240 145 167 141	F0 91 A7 8D	240 145 170 129	F0 91 AA 81	234 160 161	EA A0 A1	240 145 182 137	F0 91 B6 89	240 145 130 174	F0 91 82 AE
UTF-16	55301 56877	D805 DE2D	55302 56781	D806 DDCD	55302 56961	D806 DE81	43041	A821	55303 56713	D807 DD89	55300 56494	D804 DCAE
Numeric character reference	&#71213;	&#x1162D;	&#72141;	&#x119CD;	&#72321;	&#x11A81;	&#43041;	&#xA821;	&#73097;	&#x11D89;	&#69806;	&#x110AE;

Character information
Preview	𑒮		ᰠ		ᤛ		ꯁ		𑲍	
Unicode name	TIRHUTA LETTER SA		LEPCHA LETTER SA		LIMBU LETTER SA		MEETEI MAYEK LETTER SAM		MARCHEN LETTER SA	
Encodings	decimal	hex	dec	hex	dec	hex	dec	hex	dec	hex
Unicode	70830	U+114AE	7200	U+1C20	6427	U+191B	43969	U+ABC1	72845	U+11C8D
UTF-8	240 145 146 174	F0 91 92 AE	225 176 160	E1 B0 A0	225 164 155	E1 A4 9B	234 175 129	EA AF 81	240 145 178 141	F0 91 B2 8D
UTF-16	55301 56494	D805 DCAE	7200	1C20	6427	191B	43969	ABC1	55303 56461	D807 DC8D
Numeric character reference	&#70830;	&#x114AE;	&#7200;	&#x1C20;	&#6427;	&#x191B;	&#43969;	&#xABC1;	&#72845;	&#x11C8D;

Character information
Preview	𑚨		𑠩		𑈩		𑋝		𑅰		𑊥	
Unicode name	TAKRI LETTER SA		DOGRA LETTER SA		KHOJKI LETTER SA		KHUDAWADI LETTER SA		MAHAJANI LETTER SA		MULTANI LETTER SA	
Encodings	decimal	hex	dec	hex	dec	hex	dec	hex	dec	hex	dec	hex
Unicode	71336	U+116A8	71721	U+11829	70185	U+11229	70365	U+112DD	70000	U+11170	70309	U+112A5
UTF-8	240 145 154 168	F0 91 9A A8	240 145 160 169	F0 91 A0 A9	240 145 136 169	F0 91 88 A9	240 145 139 157	F0 91 8B 9D	240 145 133 176	F0 91 85 B0	240 145 138 165	F0 91 8A A5
UTF-16	55301 57000	D805 DEA8	55302 56361	D806 DC29	55300 56873	D804 DE29	55300 57053	D804 DEDD	55300 56688	D804 DD70	55300 56997	D804 DEA5
Numeric character reference	&#71336;	&#x116A8;	&#71721;	&#x11829;	&#70185;	&#x11229;	&#70365;	&#x112DD;	&#70000;	&#x11170;	&#70309;	&#x112A5;

Character information
Preview	ᬲ		ᯘ		ᨔ		ꦱ		𑻰		ꤼ		ᮞ	
Unicode name	BALINESE LETTER SA		BATAK LETTER SA		BUGINESE LETTER SA		JAVANESE LETTER SA		MAKASAR LETTER SA		REJANG LETTER SA		SUNDANESE LETTER SA	
Encodings	decimal	hex	dec	hex	dec	hex	dec	hex	dec	hex	dec	hex	dec	hex
Unicode	6962	U+1B32	7128	U+1BD8	6676	U+1A14	43441	U+A9B1	73456	U+11EF0	43324	U+A93C	7070	U+1B9E
UTF-8	225 172 178	E1 AC B2	225 175 152	E1 AF 98	225 168 148	E1 A8 94	234 166 177	EA A6 B1	240 145 187 176	F0 91 BB B0	234 164 188	EA A4 BC	225 174 158	E1 AE 9E
UTF-16	6962	1B32	7128	1BD8	6676	1A14	43441	A9B1	55303 57072	D807 DEF0	43324	A93C	7070	1B9E
Numeric character reference	&#6962;	&#x1B32;	&#7128;	&#x1BD8;	&#6676;	&#x1A14;	&#43441;	&#xA9B1;	&#73456;	&#x11EF0;	&#43324;	&#xA93C;	&#7070;	&#x1B9E;

Character information
Preview	ᜐ		ᝰ		ᝐ		ᜰ		𑴫	
Unicode name	TAGALOG LETTER SA		TAGBANWA LETTER SA		BUHID LETTER SA		HANUNOO LETTER SA		MASARAM GONDI LETTER SA	
Encodings	decimal	hex	dec	hex	dec	hex	dec	hex	dec	hex
Unicode	5904	U+1710	6000	U+1770	5968	U+1750	5936	U+1730	73003	U+11D2B
UTF-8	225 156 144	E1 9C 90	225 157 176	E1 9D B0	225 157 144	E1 9D 90	225 156 176	E1 9C B0	240 145 180 171	F0 91 B4 AB
UTF-16	5904	1710	6000	1770	5968	1750	5936	1730	55303 56619	D807 DD2B
Numeric character reference	&#5904;	&#x1710;	&#6000;	&#x1770;	&#5968;	&#x1750;	&#5936;	&#x1730;	&#73003;	&#x11D2B;

Character information
Preview	ᓭ		ᓯ		ᓱ		ᓴ		ᔅ	
Unicode name	CANADIAN SYLLABICS SE		CANADIAN SYLLABICS SI		CANADIAN SYLLABICS SO		CANADIAN SYLLABICS SA		CANADIAN SYLLABICS S	
Encodings	decimal	hex	dec	hex	dec	hex	dec	hex	dec	hex
Unicode	5357	U+14ED	5359	U+14EF	5361	U+14F1	5364	U+14F4	5381	U+1505
UTF-8	225 147 173	E1 93 AD	225 147 175	E1 93 AF	225 147 177	E1 93 B1	225 147 180	E1 93 B4	225 148 133	E1 94 85
Numeric character reference	&#5357;	&#x14ED;	&#5359;	&#x14EF;	&#5361;	&#x14F1;	&#5364;	&#x14F4;	&#5381;	&#x1505;

- The full range of SE Canadian syllabic characters can be found at the codepoint ranges 14ED-1505, 1507, 1509-150F, 18BE-18BF, 18DA.
