= Ba (Indic) =

Letter "Ba" in Indic scripts

Example glyphs
- Bengali–Assamese: Ba
- Tibetan: Ba
- Malayalam: ബ
- Sinhala: බ
- Ashoka Brahmi: Ba
- Devanagari: Ba

Cognates
- Hebrew: ב
- Greek: Β
- Latin: B
- Cyrillic: В, Б

Properties
- Phonemic representation: /b/
- IAST transliteration: b B
- ISCII code point: CA (202)

Ba is a consonant of Indic abugidas. In modern Indic scripts, Ba is derived from the early "Ashoka" Brahmi letter after having gone through the Gupta letter. The Brahmi letter is probably derived from the Aramaic Bet, and is thus related to the modern Latin B and Greek Beta.

== Āryabhaṭa numeration ==
Aryabhata used Devanagari letters for numbers, very similar to the Greek numerals, even after the invention of Indian numerals. The values of the different forms of ब are:

- ब [bə] = 23 (२३)
- बि [bɪ] = 2,300 (२ ३००)
- बु [bʊ] = 230,000 (२३० ०००)
- बृ [bri] = 23,000,000 (२३० ०० ०००)
- बॢ [blə] = 23×10^{8} (२३×१०^{८})
- बे [be] = 23×10^{10} (२३×१०^{१०})
- बै [bɛː] = 23×10^{12} (२३×१०^{१२})
- बो [boː] = 23×10^{14} (२३×१०^{१४})
- बौ [bɔː] = 23×10^{16} (२३×१०^{१६})

== Historic Ba ==
There are three different general early historic scripts - Brahmi and its variants, Kharoṣṭhī, and Tocharian, the so-called slanting Brahmi. Ba as found in standard Brahmi, was a simple geometric shape, with variations toward more flowing forms by the Gupta. The Tocharian Ba did not have an alternate Fremdzeichen form. The third form of ba, in Kharoshthi was probably derived from Aramaic separately from the Brahmi letter.

=== Brahmi Ba ===
The Brahmi letter, Ba, is probably derived from the Aramaic Bet, and is thus related to the modern Latin B and Greek Beta. Several identifiable styles of writing the Brahmi Ba can be found, most associated with a specific set of inscriptions from an artifact or diverse records from an historic period. As the earliest and most geometric style of Brahmi, the letters found on the Edicts of Ashoka and other records from around that time are normally the reference form for Brahmi letters, with vowel marks not attested until later forms of Brahmi back-formed to match the geometric writing style.

Brahmi Ba historic forms
Ashoka (3rd-1st c. BCE)	Girnar (~150 BCE)	Kushana (~150-250 CE)	Gujarat (~250 CE)	Gupta (~350 CE)

=== Tocharian Ba ===
The Tocharian letter is derived from the Brahmi, but does not have an alternate Fremdzeichen form.

Tocharian Ba with vowel marks
Ba	Bā	Bi	Bī	Bu	Bū	Br	Br̄	Be	Bai	Bo	Bau	Bä

=== Kharoṣṭhī Ba ===
The Kharoṣṭhī letter is generally accepted as being derived from the Aramaic Bet, and is thus related to B and Beta, in addition to the Brahmi Ba.

== Devanagari Ba ==
Ba (ब) is a consonant of the Devanagari abugida. It ultimately arose from the Brahmi letter, after having gone through the Gupta letter. Letters that derive from it are the Gujarati letter બ, and the Modi letter 𑘤.

=== Devanagari-using Languages ===
In all languages, ब is pronounced as [bə] or [b] when appropriate. Like all Indic scripts, Devanagari uses vowel marks attached to the base consonant to override the inherent /ə/ vowel:

Devanagari ब with vowel marks
Ba	Bā	Bi	Bī	Bu	Bū	Br	Br̄	Bl	Bl̄	Be	Bai	Bo	Bau	B
ब	बा	बि	बी	बु	बू	बृ	बॄ	बॢ	बॣ	बे	बै	बो	बौ	ब्

=== Conjuncts with ब ===
Half form of Ba.

Devanagari exhibits conjunct ligatures, as is common in Indic scripts. In modern Devanagari texts, most conjuncts are formed by reducing the letter shape to fit tightly to the following letter, usually by dropping a character's vertical stem, sometimes referred to as a "half form". Some conjunct clusters are always represented by a true ligature, instead of a shape that can be broken into constituent independent letters. Vertically stacked conjuncts are ubiquitous in older texts, while only a few are still used routinely in modern Devanagari texts. The use of ligatures and vertical conjuncts may vary across languages using the Devanagari script, with Marathi in particular preferring the use of half forms where texts in other languages would show ligatures and vertical stacks.

==== Ligature conjuncts of ब ====
True ligatures are quite rare in Indic scripts. The most common ligated conjuncts in Devanagari are in the form of a slight mutation to fit in context or as a consistent variant form appended to the adjacent characters. Those variants include Na and the Repha and Rakar forms of Ra. Nepali and Marathi texts use the "eyelash" Ra half form for an initial "R" instead of repha.

- Repha र্ (r) + ब (ba) gives the ligature rba: ^{note}

- Eyelash र্ (r) + ब (ba) gives the ligature rba:

- ब্ (b) + rakar र (ra) gives the ligature bra:

- ब্ (b) + न (na) gives the ligature bna:

- द্ (d) + ब (ba) gives the ligature dba:

- द্ (d) + ब্ (b) + rakar र (ra) gives the ligature dbra:

==== Stacked conjuncts of ब ====
Vertically stacked ligatures are the most common conjunct forms found in Devanagari text. Although the constituent characters may need to be stretched and moved slightly in order to stack neatly, stacked conjuncts can be broken down into recognizable base letters, or a letter and an otherwise standard ligature.

- ब্ (b) + ब (ba) gives the ligature bba:

- ब্ (b) + च (ca) gives the ligature bca:

- ब্ (b) + छ (cʰa) gives the ligature bcʰa:

- ब্ (b) + ड (ḍa) gives the ligature bḍa:

- ब্ (b) + ग (ga) gives the ligature bga:

- ब্ (b) + ज (ja) gives the ligature bja:

- ब্ (b) + ज্ (j) + ञ (ña) gives the ligature bjña:

- ब্ (b) + क (ka) gives the ligature bka:

- ब্ (b) + ल (la) gives the ligature bla:

- ब্ (b) + ङ (ŋa) gives the ligature bŋa:

- ब্ (b) + ञ (ña) gives the ligature bña:

- ब্ (b) + व (va) gives the ligature bva:

- च্ (c) + ब (ba) gives the ligature cba:

- छ্ (cʰ) + ब (ba) gives the ligature cʰba:

- ड্ (ḍ) + ब (ba) gives the ligature ḍba:

- ढ্ (ḍʱ) + ब (ba) gives the ligature ḍʱba:

- ह্ (h) + ब (ba) gives the ligature hba:

- झ্ (jʰ) + ब (ba) gives the ligature jʰba:

- क্ (k) + ब (ba) gives the ligature kba:

- ख্ (kʰ) + ब (ba) gives the ligature kʰba:

- ल্ (l) + ब (ba) gives the ligature lba:

- ळ্ (ḷ) + ब (ba) gives the ligature ḷba:

- ङ্ (ŋ) + ब (ba) gives the ligature ŋba:

- ञ্ (ñ) + ब (ba) gives the ligature ñba:

- फ্ (pʰ) + ब (ba) gives the ligature pʰba:

- स্ (s) + ब (ba) gives the ligature sba:

- श্ (ʃ) + ब (ba) gives the ligature ʃba:

- त্ (t) + ब (ba) gives the ligature tba:

- ट্ (ṭ) + ब (ba) gives the ligature ṭba:

- ठ্ (ṭʰ) + ब (ba) gives the ligature ṭʰba:

- व্ (v) + ब (ba) gives the ligature vba:

== Bengali Ba ==
The Bengali script ব is derived from the Siddhaṃ, not. The inherent vowel of Bengali consonant letters is /ɔ/, so the bare letter ব will sometimes be transliterated as "bo" instead of "ba". Adding okar, the "o" vowel mark, gives a reading of /bo/. Like all Indic consonants, ব can be modified by marks to indicate another (or no) vowel than its inherent "a".

Bengali ব with vowel marks
ba	bā	bi	bī	bu	bū	br	br̄	be	bai	bo	bau	b
ব	বা	বি	বী	বু	বূ	বৃ	বৄ	বে	বৈ	বো	বৌ	ব্

=== ব in Bengali-using languages ===
ব is used as a basic consonant character in all of the major Bengali script orthographies, including Bengali and Assamese.

=== Conjuncts with head ব ===
Bengali ব exhibits conjunct ligatures, as is common in Indic scripts, with a tendency towards stacked ligatures. When used in a non-head position in a conjunct, ব is normally not pronounced, but often geminates (doubles) the preceding consonant.

- ব্ (b) + ব (ba) gives the ligature bba:

- ব্ (b) + দ (da) gives the ligature bda:

- ব্ (b) + জ (ja) gives the ligature bja:

- ব্ (b) + ল (la) gives the ligature bla:

- ব্ (b) + র (ra) gives the ligature bra, with the ra phala suffix:

- ব্ (b) + য (ya) gives the ligature bya, with the ya phala suffix:

- র্ (r) + ব্ (b) + য (ya) gives the ligature rbya, with the repha prefix and ya phala suffix:

== Gujarati Ba ==
Gujarati Ba.

Ba (બ) is the twenty-third consonant of the Gujarati abugida. It is derived from the Devanagari Ba with the top bar (shiro rekha) removed, and ultimately the Brahmi letter.

=== Gujarati-using Languages ===
The Gujarati script is used to write the Gujarati and Kutchi languages. In both languages, બ is pronounced as [bə] or [b] when appropriate. Like all Indic scripts, Gujarati uses vowel marks attached to the base consonant to override the inherent /ə/ vowel:

Ba	Bā	Bi	Bī	Bu	Bū	Br	Bl	Br̄	Bl̄	Bĕ	Be	Bai	Bŏ	Bo	Bau	B
Gujarati Ba syllables, with vowel marks in red.

=== Conjuncts with બ ===
Half form of Ba.

Gujarati બ exhibits conjunct ligatures, much like its parent Devanagari Script. Most Gujarati conjuncts can only be formed by reducing the letter shape to fit tightly to the following letter, usually by dropping a character's vertical stem, sometimes referred to as a "half form". A few conjunct clusters can be represented by a true ligature, instead of a shape that can be broken into constituent independent letters, and vertically stacked conjuncts can also be found in Gujarati, although much less commonly than in Devanagari. True ligatures are quite rare in Indic scripts. The most common ligated conjuncts in Gujarati are in the form of a slight mutation to fit in context or as a consistent variant form appended to the adjacent characters. Those variants include Na and the Repha and Rakar forms of Ra.

- ર્ (r) + બ (ba) gives the ligature RBa:

- બ્ (b) + ર (ra) gives the ligature BRa:

- દ્ (d) + બ (ba) gives the ligature DBa:

- બ્ (b) + ન (na) gives the ligature BNa:

== Telugu Ba ==
Telugu independent and subjoined Ba.

Ba (బ) is a consonant of the Telugu abugida. It ultimately arose from the Brahmi letter. It is closely related to the Kannada letter ಬ. Since it lacks the v-shaped headstroke common to most Telugu letters, బ remains unaltered by most vowel matras, and its subjoined form is simply a smaller version of the normal letter shape. Telugu conjuncts are created by reducing trailing letters to a subjoined form that appears below the initial consonant of the conjunct. Many subjoined forms are created by dropping their headline, with many extending the end of the stroke of the main letter body to form an extended tail reaching up to the right of the preceding consonant. This subjoining of trailing letters to create conjuncts is in contrast to the leading half forms of Devanagari and Bengali letters. Ligature conjuncts are not a feature in Telugu, with the only non-standard construction being an alternate subjoined form of Ṣa (borrowed from Kannada) in the KṢa conjunct.

== Malayalam Ba ==
Malayalam letter Ba

Ba (ബ) is a consonant of the Malayalam abugida. It ultimately arose from the Brahmi letter, via the Grantha letter Ba. Like in other Indic scripts, Malayalam consonants have the inherent vowel "a", and take one of several modifying vowel signs to represent syllables with another vowel or no vowel at all.

Malayalam Ba matras: Ba, Bā, Bi, Bī, Bu, Bū, Br̥, Br̥̄, Bl̥, Bl̥̄, Be, Bē, Bai, Bo, Bō, Bau, and B.

=== Conjuncts of ബ ===
As is common in Indic scripts, Malayalam joins letters together to form conjunct consonant clusters. There are several ways in which conjuncts are formed in Malayalam texts: using a post-base form of a trailing consonant placed under the initial consonant of a conjunct, a combined ligature of two or more consonants joined together, a conjoining form that appears as a combining mark on the rest of the conjunct, the use of an explicit candrakkala mark to suppress the inherent "a" vowel, or a special consonant form called a "chillu" letter, representing a bare consonant without the inherent "a" vowel. Texts written with the modern reformed Malayalam orthography, put̪iya lipi, may favor more regular conjunct forms than older texts in paḻaya lipi, due to changes undertaken in the 1970s by the Government of Kerala.

- ബ് (b) + ദ (da) gives the ligature bda:

- ബ് (b) + ബ (ba) gives the ligature bba:

== Odia Ba ==
Odia independent and subjoined letter Ba.

Ba (ବ) is a consonant of the Odia abugida. It ultimately arose from the Brahmi letter, via the Siddhaṃ letter Ba. Like in other Indic scripts, Odia consonants have the inherent vowel "a", and take one of several modifying vowel signs to represent syllables with another vowel or no vowel at all.

Odia Ba with vowel matras
Ba	Bā	Bi	Bī	Bu	Bū	Br̥	Br̥̄	Bl̥	Bl̥̄	Be	Bai	Bo	Bau	B
ବ	ବା	ବି	ବୀ	ବୁ	ବୂ	ବୃ	ବୄ	ବୢ	ବୣ	ବେ	ବୈ	ବୋ	ବୌ	ବ୍

=== Conjuncts of ବ ===
As is common in Indic scripts, Odia joins letters together to form conjunct consonant clusters. The most common conjunct formation is achieved by using a small subjoined form of trailing consonants. Most consonants' subjoined forms are identical to the full form, just reduced in size, although a few drop the curved headline or have a subjoined form not directly related to the full form of the consonant. The subjoined form of Ba is one of these mismatched forms, and is referred to as "Ba Phala" or "Wa Phala". The second type of conjunct formation is through pure ligatures, where the constituent consonants are written together in a single graphic form. This ligature may be recognizable as being a combination of two characters or it can have a conjunct ligature unrelated to its constituent characters.

- ବ୍ (b) + ବ (ba) gives the ligature bba:

=== Odia Wa and Va ===
Odia independent letters Wa and Va.

Wa (ୱ) and Va (ଵ) are consonants of the Odia abugida that are largely unified with ବ. ବ is used to represent all three sounds /b/, /w/ and /v/ in different context, while ୱ is only pronounced as /w/. ଵ is an alternate to ୱ with less widespread usage, but all three letters share the same subjoined form.

Odia Wa with vowel matras
Wa	Wā	Wi	Wī	Wu	Wū	Wr̥	Wr̥̄	Wl̥	Wl̥̄	We	Wai	Wo	Wau	W
ୱ	ୱା	ୱି	ୱୀ	ୱୁ	ୱୂ	ୱୃ	ୱୄ	ୱୢ	ୱୣ	ୱେ	ୱୈ	ୱୋ	ୱୌ	ୱ୍
Odia Va with vowel matras
Va	Vā	Vi	Vī	Vu	Vū	Vr̥	Vr̥̄	Vl̥	Vl̥̄	Ve	Vai	Vo	Vau	V
ଵ	ଵା	ଵି	ଵୀ	ଵୁ	ଵୂ	ଵୃ	ଵୄ	ଵୢ	ଵୣ	ଵେ	ଵୈ	ଵୋ	ଵୌ	ଵ୍

== Kaithi Ba ==
Kaithi consonant and half-form Ba.

Ba (𑂥) is a consonant of the Kaithi abugida. It ultimately arose from the Brahmi letter, via the Siddhaṃ letter Ba. Like in other Indic scripts, Kaithi consonants have the inherent vowel "a", and take one of several modifying vowel signs to represent syllables with another vowel or no vowel at all.

Kaithi Ba with vowel matras
Ba	Bā	Bi	Bī	Bu	Bū	Be	Bai	Bo	Bau	B
𑂥	𑂥𑂰	𑂥𑂱	𑂥𑂲	𑂥𑂳	𑂥𑂴	𑂥𑂵	𑂥𑂶	𑂥𑂷	𑂥𑂸	𑂥𑂹

=== Conjuncts of 𑂥 ===
As is common in Indic scripts, Kaithi joins letters together to form conjunct consonant clusters. The most common conjunct formation is achieved by using a half form of preceding consonants, although several consonants use an explicit virama. Most half forms are derived from the full form by removing the vertical stem. As is common in most Indic scripts, conjuncts of ra are indicated with a repha or rakar mark attached to the rest of the consonant cluster. In addition, there are a few vertical conjuncts that can be found in Kaithi writing, but true ligatures are not used in the modern Kaithi script.

- 𑂥୍ (b) + 𑂩 (ra) gives the ligature bra:

- 𑂩୍ (r) + 𑂥 (ba) gives the ligature rba:

== Tirhuta Ba ==
Tirhuta consonant Ba

Ba (𑒥) is a consonant of the Tirhuta abugida. It ultimately arose from the Brahmi letter, via the Siddhaṃ letter Ba. Like in other Indic scripts, Tirhuta consonants have the inherent vowel "a", and take one of several modifying vowel signs to represent sylables with another vowel or no vowel at all.

Tirhuta Ba with vowel matras
Ba	Bā	Bi	Bī	Bu	Bū	Bṛ	Bṝ	Bḷ	Bḹ	Bē	Be	Bai	Bō	Bo	Bau	B
𑒥	𑒥𑒰	𑒥𑒱	𑒥𑒲	𑒥𑒳	𑒥𑒴	𑒥𑒵	𑒥𑒶	𑒥𑒷	𑒥𑒸	𑒥𑒹	𑒥𑒺	𑒥𑒻	𑒥𑒼	𑒥𑒽	𑒥𑒾	𑒥𑓂

=== Conjuncts of 𑒥 ===
As is common in Indic scripts, Tirhuta joins letters together to form conjunct consonant clusters. The most common conjunct formation is achieved by using an explicit virama. As is common in most Indic scripts, conjuncts of ra are indicated with a repha or rakar mark attached to the rest of the consonant cluster. In addition, other consonants take unique combining forms when in conjunct with other letters, and there are several vertical conjuncts and true ligatures that can be found in Tirhuta writing.

- 𑒥୍ (b) + 𑒠 (da) gives the ligature bda:

- 𑒥୍ (b) + 𑒡 (dʱa) gives the ligature bdʱa:

- 𑒥୍ (b) + 𑒩 (ra) gives the ligature bra:

- 𑒥୍ (b) + 𑒫 (va) gives the ligature bva:

- 𑒧୍ (m) + 𑒥 (ba) gives the ligature mba:

- 𑒩୍ (r) + 𑒥 (ba) gives the ligature rba:

- 𑒞୍ (t) + 𑒥 (ba) gives the ligature tba:

== Comparison of Ba ==
The various Indic scripts are generally related to each other through adaptation and borrowing, and as such the glyphs for cognate letters, including Ba, are related as well.

Comparison of Ba in different scripts

Aramaic
Kharoṣṭhī 𐨦	Ashoka Brahmi	Kushana Brahmi (Note: The middle "Kushana" form of Brahmi is a later style that emerged as Brahmi scripts were beginning to proliferate. Gupta Brahmi was definitely a stylistic descendant from Kushana, but other Brahmi-derived scripts may have descended from earlier forms.)	Tocharian (Note: Tocharian is probably derived from the middle period "Kushana" form of Brahmi, although artifacts from that time are not plentiful enough to establish a definite succession.)
Gupta Brahmi	Pallava
Kadamba -
Bhaiksuki 𑰤	Siddhaṃ	Grantha 𑌬	Cham ꨝ
Sinhala බ	Pyu / Old Mon (Note: Pyu and Old Mon are probably the precursors of the Burmese script, and may be derived from either the Pallava or Kadamba script) -
Tibetan	Newa 𑐧	Ahom 𑜈	Malayalam ബ
Telugu బ	Burmese ဗ
Lepcha ᰓ	Ranjana	Saurashtra ꢨ	Dives Akuru 𑤢
Kannada ಬ	Kayah Li ꤙ
Limbu ᤒ	Soyombo (Note: May also be derived from Devangari (see bottom left of table)) 𑩲	Khmer ព	Tamil -
Chakma 𑄝 / 𑅇	Tai Tham ᨻ / ᨼ
Meitei Mayek ꯕ	Gaudi -	Thai พ / ฟ	Lao ພ / ຟ
Tai Le -
Marchen 𑲀	Tirhuta 𑒥	New Tai Lue ᦗ / ᦝ	Tai Viet ꪚ / ꪛ	Aksara Kawi
'Phags-pa ꡎ	Odia ବ	Sharada 𑆧	Rejang ꤷ	Batak ᯅ / ᯆ	Buginese ᨅ
Zanabazar Square 𑨠	Bengali–Assamese	Takri 𑚠	Javanese ꦧ	Balinese ᬩ	Makasar 𑻤
Hangul (Note: The Origin of Hangul from 'Phags-pa is one of limited influence, inspiring at most a few basic letter shapes. Hangul does not function as an Indic abugida.) ㅂ	Northern Nagari -	Dogri 𑠠	Laṇḍā -	Sundanese ᮘ	Baybayin ᜊ
Modi 𑘤	Gujarati બ	Khojki 𑈡	Khudabadi 𑋔	Mahajani 𑅪	Tagbanwa ᝪ
Devanagari	Nandinagari 𑧄	Kaithi	Gurmukhi ਬ	Multani 𑊝	Buhid ᝊ
Canadian Syllabics (Note: Although the basic letter forms of the Canadian Aboriginal Syllabics were derived from handwritten Devanagari letters, this abugida indicates vowel sounds by rotations of the letter form, rather than the use of vowel diacritics as is standard in Indic abugidas.) -	Soyombo (Note: May also be derived from Ranjana (see above)) 𑩲	Sylheti Nagari ꠛ	Gunjala Gondi 𑵮	Masaram Gondi (Note: Masaram Gondi acts as an Indic abugida, but its letterforms were not derived from any single precursor script.) 𑴢	Hanuno'o ᜪ

== Character encodings of Ba ==
Most Indic scripts are encoded in the Unicode Standard, and as such the letter Ba in those scripts can be represented in plain text with unique codepoint. Ba from several modern-use scripts can also be found in legacy encodings, such as ISCII.

Character information
Preview					బ		ବ		ಬ		ബ		બ		ਬ	
Unicode name	DEVANAGARI LETTER BA		BENGALI LETTER BA		TELUGU LETTER BA		ORIYA LETTER BA		KANNADA LETTER BA		MALAYALAM LETTER BA		GUJARATI LETTER BA		GURMUKHI LETTER BA	
Encodings	decimal	hex	dec	hex	dec	hex	dec	hex	dec	hex	dec	hex	dec	hex	dec	hex
Unicode	2348	U+092C	2476	U+09AC	3116	U+0C2C	2860	U+0B2C	3244	U+0CAC	3372	U+0D2C	2732	U+0AAC	2604	U+0A2C
UTF-8	224 164 172	E0 A4 AC	224 166 172	E0 A6 AC	224 176 172	E0 B0 AC	224 172 172	E0 AC AC	224 178 172	E0 B2 AC	224 180 172	E0 B4 AC	224 170 172	E0 AA AC	224 168 172	E0 A8 AC
Numeric character reference	&#2348;	&#x92C;	&#2476;	&#x9AC;	&#3116;	&#xC2C;	&#2860;	&#xB2C;	&#3244;	&#xCAC;	&#3372;	&#xD2C;	&#2732;	&#xAAC;	&#2604;	&#xA2C;
ISCII	202	CA	202	CA	202	CA	202	CA	202	CA	202	CA	202	CA	202	CA

Character information
Preview	Ashoka Kushana Gupta		𐨦				𑌬	
Unicode name	BRAHMI LETTER BA		KHAROSHTHI LETTER BA		SIDDHAM LETTER BA		GRANTHA LETTER BA	
Encodings	decimal	hex	dec	hex	dec	hex	dec	hex
Unicode	69673	U+11029	68134	U+10A26	71076	U+115A4	70444	U+1132C
UTF-8	240 145 128 169	F0 91 80 A9	240 144 168 166	F0 90 A8 A6	240 145 150 164	F0 91 96 A4	240 145 140 172	F0 91 8C AC
UTF-16	55300 56361	D804 DC29	55298 56870	D802 DE26	55301 56740	D805 DDA4	55300 57132	D804 DF2C
Numeric character reference	&#69673;	&#x11029;	&#68134;	&#x10A26;	&#71076;	&#x115A4;	&#70444;	&#x1132C;

Character information
Preview			ྦ		ꡎ		𑨠		𑐧		𑰤		𑆧	
Unicode name	TIBETAN LETTER BA		TIBETAN SUBJOINED LETTER BA		PHAGS-PA LETTER BA		ZANABAZAR SQUARE LETTER BA		NEWA LETTER BA		BHAIKSUKI LETTER BA		SHARADA LETTER BA	
Encodings	decimal	hex	dec	hex	dec	hex	dec	hex	dec	hex	dec	hex	dec	hex
Unicode	3926	U+0F56	4006	U+0FA6	43086	U+A84E	72224	U+11A20	70695	U+11427	72740	U+11C24	70055	U+111A7
UTF-8	224 189 150	E0 BD 96	224 190 166	E0 BE A6	234 161 142	EA A1 8E	240 145 168 160	F0 91 A8 A0	240 145 144 167	F0 91 90 A7	240 145 176 164	F0 91 B0 A4	240 145 134 167	F0 91 86 A7
UTF-16	3926	0F56	4006	0FA6	43086	A84E	55302 56864	D806 DE20	55301 56359	D805 DC27	55303 56356	D807 DC24	55300 56743	D804 DDA7
Numeric character reference	&#3926;	&#xF56;	&#4006;	&#xFA6;	&#43086;	&#xA84E;	&#72224;	&#x11A20;	&#70695;	&#x11427;	&#72740;	&#x11C24;	&#70055;	&#x111A7;

Character information
Preview	ဗ		ᦗ		ᦝ	
Unicode name	MYANMAR LETTER BA		NEW TAI LUE LETTER LOW PA		NEW TAI LUE LETTER LOW FA	
Encodings	decimal	hex	dec	hex	dec	hex
Unicode	4119	U+1017	6551	U+1997	6557	U+199D
UTF-8	225 128 151	E1 80 97	225 166 151	E1 A6 97	225 166 157	E1 A6 9D
Numeric character reference	&#4119;	&#x1017;	&#6551;	&#x1997;	&#6557;	&#x199D;

- See further below for Tai Tham codepoints.

Character information
Preview	ព		ພ		ຟ		พ		ฟ		ꪚ		ꪛ	
Unicode name	KHMER LETTER PO		LAO LETTER PHO TAM		LAO LETTER FO SUNG		THAI CHARACTER PHO PHAN		THAI CHARACTER FO FAN		TAI VIET LETTER LOW BO		TAI VIET LETTER HIGH BO	
Encodings	decimal	hex	dec	hex	dec	hex	dec	hex	dec	hex	dec	hex	dec	hex
Unicode	6038	U+1796	3742	U+0E9E	3743	U+0E9F	3614	U+0E1E	3615	U+0E1F	43674	U+AA9A	43675	U+AA9B
UTF-8	225 158 150	E1 9E 96	224 186 158	E0 BA 9E	224 186 159	E0 BA 9F	224 184 158	E0 B8 9E	224 184 159	E0 B8 9F	234 170 154	EA AA 9A	234 170 155	EA AA 9B
Numeric character reference	&#6038;	&#x1796;	&#3742;	&#xE9E;	&#3743;	&#xE9F;	&#3614;	&#xE1E;	&#3615;	&#xE1F;	&#43674;	&#xAA9A;	&#43675;	&#xAA9B;

Character information
Preview	බ		ꤙ		𑄝		𑅇		𑜈		𑤢		ꢨ		ꨝ	
Unicode name	SINHALA LETTER ALPAPRAANA BAYANNA		KAYAH LI LETTER BA		CHAKMA LETTER BAA		CHAKMA LETTER VAA		AHOM LETTER BA		DIVES AKURU LETTER BA		SAURASHTRA LETTER BA		CHAM LETTER BA	
Encodings	decimal	hex	dec	hex	dec	hex	dec	hex	dec	hex	dec	hex	dec	hex	dec	hex
Unicode	3510	U+0DB6	43289	U+A919	69917	U+1111D	69959	U+11147	71432	U+11708	71970	U+11922	43176	U+A8A8	43549	U+AA1D
UTF-8	224 182 182	E0 B6 B6	234 164 153	EA A4 99	240 145 132 157	F0 91 84 9D	240 145 133 135	F0 91 85 87	240 145 156 136	F0 91 9C 88	240 145 164 162	F0 91 A4 A2	234 162 168	EA A2 A8	234 168 157	EA A8 9D
UTF-16	3510	0DB6	43289	A919	55300 56605	D804 DD1D	55300 56647	D804 DD47	55301 57096	D805 DF08	55302 56610	D806 DD22	43176	A8A8	43549	AA1D
Numeric character reference	&#3510;	&#xDB6;	&#43289;	&#xA919;	&#69917;	&#x1111D;	&#69959;	&#x11147;	&#71432;	&#x11708;	&#71970;	&#x11922;	&#43176;	&#xA8A8;	&#43549;	&#xAA1D;

Character information
Preview	𑘤		𑧄		𑩲		ꠛ		𑵮			
Unicode name	MODI LETTER BA		NANDINAGARI LETTER BA		SOYOMBO LETTER BA		SYLOTI NAGRI LETTER BO		GUNJALA GONDI LETTER BA		KAITHI LETTER BA	
Encodings	decimal	hex	dec	hex	dec	hex	dec	hex	dec	hex	dec	hex
Unicode	71204	U+11624	72132	U+119C4	72306	U+11A72	43035	U+A81B	73070	U+11D6E	69797	U+110A5
UTF-8	240 145 152 164	F0 91 98 A4	240 145 167 132	F0 91 A7 84	240 145 169 178	F0 91 A9 B2	234 160 155	EA A0 9B	240 145 181 174	F0 91 B5 AE	240 145 130 165	F0 91 82 A5
UTF-16	55301 56868	D805 DE24	55302 56772	D806 DDC4	55302 56946	D806 DE72	43035	A81B	55303 56686	D807 DD6E	55300 56485	D804 DCA5
Numeric character reference	&#71204;	&#x11624;	&#72132;	&#x119C4;	&#72306;	&#x11A72;	&#43035;	&#xA81B;	&#73070;	&#x11D6E;	&#69797;	&#x110A5;

Character information
Preview	𑒥		ᰓ		ᤒ		ꯕ		𑲀	
Unicode name	TIRHUTA LETTER BA		LEPCHA LETTER BA		LIMBU LETTER BA		MEETEI MAYEK LETTER BA		MARCHEN LETTER BA	
Encodings	decimal	hex	dec	hex	dec	hex	dec	hex	dec	hex
Unicode	70821	U+114A5	7187	U+1C13	6418	U+1912	43989	U+ABD5	72832	U+11C80
UTF-8	240 145 146 165	F0 91 92 A5	225 176 147	E1 B0 93	225 164 146	E1 A4 92	234 175 149	EA AF 95	240 145 178 128	F0 91 B2 80
UTF-16	55301 56485	D805 DCA5	7187	1C13	6418	1912	43989	ABD5	55303 56448	D807 DC80
Numeric character reference	&#70821;	&#x114A5;	&#7187;	&#x1C13;	&#6418;	&#x1912;	&#43989;	&#xABD5;	&#72832;	&#x11C80;

Character information
Preview	𑚠		𑠠		𑈡		𑋔		𑅪		𑊝	
Unicode name	TAKRI LETTER BA		DOGRA LETTER BA		KHOJKI LETTER BA		KHUDAWADI LETTER BA		MAHAJANI LETTER BA		MULTANI LETTER BA	
Encodings	decimal	hex	dec	hex	dec	hex	dec	hex	dec	hex	dec	hex
Unicode	71328	U+116A0	71712	U+11820	70177	U+11221	70356	U+112D4	69994	U+1116A	70301	U+1129D
UTF-8	240 145 154 160	F0 91 9A A0	240 145 160 160	F0 91 A0 A0	240 145 136 161	F0 91 88 A1	240 145 139 148	F0 91 8B 94	240 145 133 170	F0 91 85 AA	240 145 138 157	F0 91 8A 9D
UTF-16	55301 56992	D805 DEA0	55302 56352	D806 DC20	55300 56865	D804 DE21	55300 57044	D804 DED4	55300 56682	D804 DD6A	55300 56989	D804 DE9D
Numeric character reference	&#71328;	&#x116A0;	&#71712;	&#x11820;	&#70177;	&#x11221;	&#70356;	&#x112D4;	&#69994;	&#x1116A;	&#70301;	&#x1129D;

Character information
Preview	ᬩ		ᯅ		ᨅ		ꦧ		𑻤		ꤷ		ᮘ	
Unicode name	BALINESE LETTER BA		BATAK LETTER BA		BUGINESE LETTER BA		JAVANESE LETTER BA		MAKASAR LETTER BA		REJANG LETTER BA		SUNDANESE LETTER BA	
Encodings	decimal	hex	dec	hex	dec	hex	dec	hex	dec	hex	dec	hex	dec	hex
Unicode	6953	U+1B29	7109	U+1BC5	6661	U+1A05	43431	U+A9A7	73444	U+11EE4	43319	U+A937	7064	U+1B98
UTF-8	225 172 169	E1 AC A9	225 175 133	E1 AF 85	225 168 133	E1 A8 85	234 166 167	EA A6 A7	240 145 187 164	F0 91 BB A4	234 164 183	EA A4 B7	225 174 152	E1 AE 98
UTF-16	6953	1B29	7109	1BC5	6661	1A05	43431	A9A7	55303 57060	D807 DEE4	43319	A937	7064	1B98
Numeric character reference	&#6953;	&#x1B29;	&#7109;	&#x1BC5;	&#6661;	&#x1A05;	&#43431;	&#xA9A7;	&#73444;	&#x11EE4;	&#43319;	&#xA937;	&#7064;	&#x1B98;

Character information
Preview	ᜊ		ᝪ		ᝊ		ᜪ		𑴢	
Unicode name	TAGALOG LETTER BA		TAGBANWA LETTER BA		BUHID LETTER BA		HANUNOO LETTER BA		MASARAM GONDI LETTER BA	
Encodings	decimal	hex	dec	hex	dec	hex	dec	hex	dec	hex
Unicode	5898	U+170A	5994	U+176A	5962	U+174A	5930	U+172A	72994	U+11D22
UTF-8	225 156 138	E1 9C 8A	225 157 170	E1 9D AA	225 157 138	E1 9D 8A	225 156 170	E1 9C AA	240 145 180 162	F0 91 B4 A2
UTF-16	5898	170A	5994	176A	5962	174A	5930	172A	55303 56610	D807 DD22
Numeric character reference	&#5898;	&#x170A;	&#5994;	&#x176A;	&#5962;	&#x174A;	&#5930;	&#x172A;	&#72994;	&#x11D22;

Character information
Preview	ᨻ		ᩛ		ᩚ		ᨼ	
Unicode name	TAI THAM LETTER LOW PA		TAI THAM CONSONANT SIGN HIGH RATHA OR LOW PA		TAI THAM CONSONANT SIGN LOW PA		TAI THAM LETTER LOW FA	
Encodings	decimal	hex	dec	hex	dec	hex	dec	hex
Unicode	6715	U+1A3B	6747	U+1A5B	6746	U+1A5A	6716	U+1A3C
UTF-8	225 168 187	E1 A8 BB	225 169 155	E1 A9 9B	225 169 154	E1 A9 9A	225 168 188	E1 A8 BC
Numeric character reference	&#6715;	&#x1A3B;	&#6747;	&#x1A5B;	&#6746;	&#x1A5A;	&#6716;	&#x1A3C;
