= Khojki (Unicode block) =

- Range: U+11200..U+1124F (80 code points)
- Plane: SMP
- Scripts: Khojki
- Major alphabets: Khojki
- Assigned: 65 code points
- Unused: 15 reserved code points

Unicode Version History
- 7.0 (2014): 61 (+61)
- 9.0 (2016): 62 (+1)
- 15.0 (2022): 65 (+3)

Unicode documentation
- Code chart ∣ Web page

Khojki is a Unicode block containing characters used by the Khoja community of South Asia.

Khojki^{[1]}^{[2]} Official Unicode Consortium code chart (PDF)
| | 0 | 1 | 2 | 3 | 4 | 5 | 6 | 7 | 8 | 9 | A | B | C | D | E | F |
| U+1120x | 𑈀 | 𑈁 | 𑈂 | 𑈃 | 𑈄 | 𑈅 | 𑈆 | 𑈇 | 𑈈 | 𑈉 | 𑈊 | 𑈋 | 𑈌 | 𑈍 | 𑈎 | 𑈏 |
| U+1121x | 𑈐 | 𑈑 | | 𑈓 | 𑈔 | 𑈕 | 𑈖 | 𑈗 | 𑈘 | 𑈙 | 𑈚 | 𑈛 | 𑈜 | 𑈝 | 𑈞 | 𑈟 |
| U+1122x | 𑈠 | 𑈡 | 𑈢 | 𑈣 | 𑈤 | 𑈥 | 𑈦 | 𑈧 | 𑈨 | 𑈩 | 𑈪 | 𑈫 | 𑈬 | 𑈭 | 𑈮 | 𑈯 |
| U+1123x | 𑈰 | 𑈱 | 𑈲 | 𑈳 | 𑈴 | 𑈵 | 𑈶 | 𑈷 | 𑈸 | 𑈹 | 𑈺 | 𑈻 | 𑈼 | 𑈽 | 𑈾 | 𑈿 |
| U+1124x | 𑉀 | 𑉁 | | | | | | | | | | | | | | |
Notes 1.As of Unicode version 17.0 2.Grey areas indicate non-assigned code points

== History ==
The following Unicode-related documents record the purpose and process of defining specific characters in the Khojki block:

| Version | Final code points (Note: Proposed code points and characters names may differ from final code points and names) | Count | L2 ID | WG2 ID | Document |
|---|---|---|---|---|---|
| 7.0 | U+11200..11211, 11213..1123D | 61 | L2/08-201 | | Pandey, Anshuman (2008-05-05), Towards an Encoding for the Khojki Script in ISO/IEC 10646 |
| 7.0 | U+11200..11211, 11213..1123D | 61 | L2/09-101 | N3596 | Pandey, Anshuman (2009-03-25), Proposal to Encode the Khojki Script in ISO/IEC 10646 |
| 7.0 | U+11200..11211, 11213..1123D | 61 | L2/10-326 | N3883 | Pandey, Anshuman (2010-09-12), Revised Proposal to Encode the Khojki Script in ISO/IEC 10646 |
| 7.0 | U+11200..11211, 11213..1123D | 61 | L2/10-440 | | Anderson, Deborah; McGowan, Rick; Whistler, Ken (2010-10-27), "6. Khojki", Review of Indic-related L2 documents and Recommendations to the UTC |
| 7.0 | U+11200..11211, 11213..1123D | 61 | L2/10-416R | | Moore, Lisa (2010-11-09), "C.2", UTC #125 / L2 #222 Minutes |
| 7.0 | U+11200..11211, 11213..1123D | 61 | L2/11-021 | N3978 | Pandey, Anshuman (2011-01-28), Final Proposal to Encode the Khojki Script in ISO/IEC 10646 |
| 7.0 | U+11200..11211, 11213..1123D | 61 | L2/11-042 | | Anderson, Deborah; McGowan, Rick; Whistler, Ken (2011-02-02), "7. Khojki", Review of Indic related L2 documents and Recommendations to the UTC |
| 7.0 | U+11200..11211, 11213..1123D | 61 | L2/11-016 | | Moore, Lisa (2011-02-15), "D.1", UTC #126 / L2 #223 Minutes |
| 7.0 | U+11200..11211, 11213..1123D | 61 | | N4103 | "11.2.1 Khojki Script", Unconfirmed minutes of WG 2 meeting 58, 2012-01-03 |
| 9.0 | U+1123E | 1 | L2/14-133 | N4575 | Pandey, Anshuman (2014-05-05), Proposal to Encode the Khojki Sign SUKUN |
| 9.0 | U+1123E | 1 | L2/14-100 | | Moore, Lisa (2014-05-13), "D.9", UTC #139 Minutes |
| 9.0 | U+1123E | 1 | L2/16-052 | N4603 (pdf, doc) | Umamaheswaran, V. S. (2015-09-01), "M63.02g", Unconfirmed minutes of WG 2 meeting 63 |
| 15.0 | U+1123F | 1 | L2/21-103 | | Pandey, Anshuman (2021-05-21), Proposal to encode the Khojki letter QA |
| 15.0 | U+1123F | 1 | L2/21-130 | | Anderson, Deborah; Whistler, Ken; Pournader, Roozbeh; Liang, Hai (2021-07-26), "10b. QA", Recommendations to UTC #168 July 2021 on Script Proposals |
| 15.0 | U+1123F | 1 | L2/21-123 | | Cummings, Craig (2021-08-03), "B.1 Section 10b, QA", Draft Minutes of UTC Meeting 168 |
| 15.0 | U+11240 | 1 | L2/21-104 | | Pandey, Anshuman (2021-05-21), Proposal to encode the Khojki letter SHORT I |
| 15.0 | U+11240 | 1 | L2/21-130 | | Anderson, Deborah; Whistler, Ken; Pournader, Roozbeh; Liang, Hai (2021-07-26), "10c. Short I", Recommendations to UTC #168 July 2021 on Script Proposals |
| 15.0 | U+11240 | 1 | L2/21-123 | | Cummings, Craig (2021-08-03), "B.1 Section 10c, Short I", Draft Minutes of UTC Meeting 168 |
| 15.0 | U+11241 | 1 | L2/11-021 | N3978 | Pandey, Anshuman (2011-01-28), Final Proposal to Encode the Khojki Script in ISO/IEC 10646 |
| 15.0 | U+11241 | 1 | L2/17-307 | | A, Srinidhi; A, Sridatta (2017-08-30), Proposal to encode two characters in Khojki |
| 15.0 | U+11241 | 1 | L2/18-039 | | Anderson, Deborah; Whistler, Ken; Pournader, Roozbeh; Moore, Lisa; Liang, Hai; Cook, Richard (2018-01-19), "12. Khojki", Recommendations to UTC #154 January 2018 on Script Proposals |
| 15.0 | U+11241 | 1 | L2/18-168 | | Anderson, Deborah; Whistler, Ken; Pournader, Roozbeh; Moore, Lisa; Liang, Hai; Chapman, Chris; Cook, Richard (2018-04-28), "33. Khojki", Recommendations to UTC #155 April-May 2018 on Script Proposals |
| 15.0 | U+11241 | 1 | L2/21-110 | | Pandey, Anshuman (2021-05-25), Proposal to encode the Khojki vowel sign VOCALIC R |
| 15.0 | U+11241 | 1 | L2/21-130 | | Anderson, Deborah; Whistler, Ken; Pournader, Roozbeh; Liang, Hai (2021-07-26), "10a. Vocalic R", Recommendations to UTC #168 July 2021 on Script Proposals |
| 15.0 | U+11241 | 1 | L2/21-123 | | Cummings, Craig (2021-08-03), "B.1 Section 10a, Vocalic R", Draft Minutes of UTC Meeting 168 |
