= Common Indic Number Forms =

- Range: U+A830..U+A83F (16 code points)
- Plane: BMP
- Scripts: Common
- Symbol sets: Indic numbers
- Assigned: 10 code points
- Unused: 6 reserved code points

Unicode version history
- 5.2 (2009): 10 (+10)

Unicode documentation
- Code chart ∣ Web page

Common Indic Number Forms is a Unicode block containing characters for representing fractions in north India, Pakistan, and Nepal.

Common Indic Number Forms^{[1]}^{[2]} Official Unicode Consortium code chart (PDF)
| | 0 | 1 | 2 | 3 | 4 | 5 | 6 | 7 | 8 | 9 | A | B | C | D | E | F |
| U+A83x | ꠰ | ꠱ | ꠲ | ꠳ | ꠴ | ꠵ | ꠶ | ꠷ | ꠸ | ꠹ | | | | | | |
Notes: 1. As of Unicode version 16.0; 2. Grey areas indicate non-assigned code points

== History ==
The following Unicode-related documents record the purpose and process of defining specific characters in the Common Indic Number Forms block:

| Version | Final code points (Note: Proposed code points and characters names may differ from final code points and names) | Count | L2 ID | WG2 ID | Document |
|---|---|---|---|---|---|
| 5.2 | U+A830..A839 | 10 | L2/03-102 | | Vikas, Om (2003-03-04), Unicode Standard for Indic Scripts |
| 5.2 | U+A830..A839 | 10 | L2/03-101.3 | | Proposed Changes in Indic Scripts [Gujarati document], 2003-03-04 |
| 5.2 | U+A830..A839 | 10 | L2/04-358 | | Jain, Manoj (2004-09-29), Encoding of Gujarati Signs Pao, Addho & Pono in Gujarati code block |
| 5.2 | U+A830..A839 | 10 | L2/04-402 | | Muller, Eric (2004-11-14), Clarifications on L2/04-358, Gujarati fractions |
| 5.2 | U+A830..A839 | 10 | L2/04-418 | | Muller, Eric (2004-11-18), "Gujarati fractions", Report of the Indic ad-hoc |
| 5.2 | U+A830..A839 | 10 | L2/05-063 | | Vikas, Om (2005-02-07), "Awaiting Updates-Gujarati", Issues in Representation of Indic Scripts in Unicode |
| 5.2 | U+A830..A839 | 10 | L2/05-070 | | McGowan, Rick (2005-02-09), Indic ad hoc report |
| 5.2 | U+A830..A839 | 10 | L2/05-026 | | Moore, Lisa (2005-05-16), "Scripts - Indic (C.12)", UTC #102 Minutes |
| 5.2 | U+A830..A839 | 10 | | N3353 (pdf, doc) | Umamaheswaran, V. S. (2007-10-10), "M51.17", Unconfirmed minutes of WG 2 meeting 51 Hanzhou, China; 2007-04-24/27 |
| 5.2 | U+A830..A839 | 10 | L2/07-139 | N3312 | Pandey, Anshuman (2007-05-04), Proposal to Encode North Indian Accounting Signs in Plane 1 of ISO/IEC 10646 |
| 5.2 | U+A830..A839 | 10 | L2/07-118R2 | | Moore, Lisa (2007-05-23), "Consensus 111-C18", UTC #111 Minutes |
| 5.2 | U+A830..A839 | 10 | L2/07-238 | N3334 | Pandey, Anshuman (2007-07-31), Towards an Encoding for North Indic Number Forms in the UCS |
| 5.2 | U+A830..A839 | 10 | L2/07-272 | | Muller, Eric (2007-08-10), "7", Report of the South Asia subcommittee |
| 5.2 | U+A830..A839 | 10 | L2/07-225 | | Moore, Lisa (2007-08-21), "North Indic Number Forms", UTC #112 Minutes |
| 5.2 | U+A830..A839 | 10 | L2/07-354 | N3367 | Pandey, Anshuman (2007-10-07), Proposal to Encode North Indic Number Forms |
| 5.2 | U+A830..A839 | 10 | L2/07-390 | | Anderson, Deborah (2007-10-14), Changes in L2/07-354 North Indic Number Forms (vs. L2/07-139) |
| 5.2 | U+A830..A839 | 10 | L2/17-340 | | Johny, Cibu (2017-09-22), Request to Annotate North Indian Quarter Signs for Malayalam Usage |
| 5.2 | U+A830..A839 | 10 | L2/17-424 | | A, Srinidhi; A, Sridatta (2017-12-08), Changes to ScriptExtensions.txt for Indic characters for Unicode 11.0 |
| 5.2 | U+A830..A839 | 10 | L2/18-039 | | Anderson, Deborah; Whistler, Ken; Pournader, Roozbeh; Moore, Lisa; Liang, Hai; Cook, Richard (2018-01-19), "North Indian Quarter Signs, ScriptExtensions.txt changes for Indic", Recommendations to UTC #154 January 2018 on Script Proposals |
| 5.2 | U+A830..A839 | 10 | L2/18-007 | | Moore, Lisa (2018-03-19), "Action item 154-A120", UTC #154 Minutes, "Make script extension changes in version 11.0 as documented in section 6B, pages 6-9 of L2/18-039." |
| 5.2 | U+A830..A839 | 10 | L2/18-115 | | Moore, Lisa (2018-05-09), "Action item 154-A118", UTC #155 Minutes, "Update U+A830..U+A832 in ScriptExtensions.txt with script code Mlym for Unicode 11.0." |
