= Malayalam (Unicode block) =

- Range: U+0D00..U+0D7F (128 code points)
- Plane: BMP
- Scripts: Malayalam
- Major alphabets: Malayalam
- Assigned: 118 code points
- Unused: 10 reserved code points
- Source standards: ISCII

Unicode Version History
- 1.0.0 (1991): 78 (+78)
- 5.1 (2008): 95 (+17)
- 6.0 (2010): 98 (+3)
- 7.0 (2014): 99 (+1)
- 8.0 (2015): 100 (+1)
- 9.0 (2016): 114 (+14)
- 10.0 (2017): 117 (+3)
- 13.0 (2020): 118 (+1)

Unicode documentation
- Code chart ∣ Web page

Malayalam is a Unicode block containing characters of the Malayalam script. In its original incarnation, the code points U+0D02..U+0D4D were a direct copy of the Malayalam characters A2-ED from the 1988 ISCII standard. The Devanagari, Bengali, Gurmukhi, Gujarati, Oriya, Tamil, Telugu, and Kannada blocks were similarly all based on their ISCII encodings.

== Block ==
Malayalam^{[1]}^{[2]} Official Unicode Consortium code chart (PDF)
	0	1	2	3	4	5	6	7	8	9	A	B	C	D	E	F
U+0D0x	ഀ	ഁ	ം	ഃ	ഄ	അ	ആ	ഇ	ഈ	ഉ	ഊ	ഋ	ഌ		എ	ഏ
U+0D1x	ഐ		ഒ	ഓ	ഔ	ക	ഖ	ഗ	ഘ	ങ	ച	ഛ	ജ	ഝ	ഞ	ട
U+0D2x	ഠ	ഡ	ഢ	ണ	ത	ഥ	ദ	ധ	ന	ഩ	പ	ഫ	ബ	ഭ	മ	യ
U+0D3x	ര	റ	ല	ള	ഴ	വ	ശ	ഷ	സ	ഹ	ഺ	഻	഼	ഽ	ാ	ി
U+0D4x	ീ	ു	ൂ	ൃ	ൄ		െ	േ	ൈ		ൊ	ോ	ൌ	്	ൎ	൏
U+0D5x					ൔ	ൕ	ൖ	ൗ	൘	൙	൚	൛	൜	൝	൞	ൟ
U+0D6x	ൠ	ൡ	ൢ	ൣ			൦	൧	൨	൩	൪	൫	൬	൭	൮	൯
U+0D7x	൰	൱	൲	൳	൴	൵	൶	൷	൸	൹	ൺ	ൻ	ർ	ൽ	ൾ	ൿ
Notes 1.As of Unicode version 17.0 2.Grey areas indicate non-assigned code points

== History ==
The following Unicode-related documents record the purpose and process of defining specific characters in the Malayalam block:

Version	Final code points (Note: Proposed code points and characters names may differ from final code points and names)	Count	UTC ID	L2 ID	WG2 ID	Document
1.0.0	U+0D02..0D03, 0D05..0D0C, 0D0E..0D10, 0D12..0D28, 0D2A..0D39, 0D3E..0D43, 0D46..0D48, 0D4A..0D4D, 0D57, 0D60..0D61, 0D66..0D6F	78	UTC/1991-056			Whistler, Ken, Indic Charts: Devanagari, Bengali, Gurmukhi, Gujarati, Oriya, Tamil, Telugu, Kannada, Malayalam
1.0.0	U+0D02..0D03, 0D05..0D0C, 0D0E..0D10, 0D12..0D28, 0D2A..0D39, 0D3E..0D43, 0D46..0D48, 0D4A..0D4D, 0D57, 0D60..0D61, 0D66..0D6F	78	UTC/1991-057			Whistler, Ken, Indic names list
1.0.0	U+0D02..0D03, 0D05..0D0C, 0D0E..0D10, 0D12..0D28, 0D2A..0D39, 0D3E..0D43, 0D46..0D48, 0D4A..0D4D, 0D57, 0D60..0D61, 0D66..0D6F	78	UTC/1991-048B			Whistler, Ken (1991-03-27), "III. L. Walk In proposals", Draft Minutes from the UTC meeting #46 day 2, 3/27 at Apple
1.0.0	U+0D02..0D03, 0D05..0D0C, 0D0E..0D10, 0D12..0D28, 0D2A..0D39, 0D3E..0D43, 0D46..0D48, 0D4A..0D4D, 0D57, 0D60..0D61, 0D66..0D6F	78		L2/01-303		Vikas, Om (2001-07-26), Letter from the Government from India on "Draft for Unicode Standard for Indian Scripts"
1.0.0	U+0D02..0D03, 0D05..0D0C, 0D0E..0D10, 0D12..0D28, 0D2A..0D39, 0D3E..0D43, 0D46..0D48, 0D4A..0D4D, 0D57, 0D60..0D61, 0D66..0D6F	78		L2/01-304		Feedback on Unicode Standard 3.0, 2001-08-02
1.0.0	U+0D02..0D03, 0D05..0D0C, 0D0E..0D10, 0D12..0D28, 0D2A..0D39, 0D3E..0D43, 0D46..0D48, 0D4A..0D4D, 0D57, 0D60..0D61, 0D66..0D6F	78		L2/01-305		McGowan, Rick (2001-08-08), Draft UTC Response to L2/01-304, "Feedback on Unicode Standard 3.0"
1.0.0	U+0D02..0D03, 0D05..0D0C, 0D0E..0D10, 0D12..0D28, 0D2A..0D39, 0D3E..0D43, 0D46..0D48, 0D4A..0D4D, 0D57, 0D60..0D61, 0D66..0D6F	78		L2/01-430R		McGowan, Rick (2001-11-20), UTC Response to L2/01-304, "Feedback on Unicode Standard 3.0"
1.0.0	U+0D02..0D03, 0D05..0D0C, 0D0E..0D10, 0D12..0D28, 0D2A..0D39, 0D3E..0D43, 0D46..0D48, 0D4A..0D4D, 0D57, 0D60..0D61, 0D66..0D6F	78		L2/05-087		Ganesan, Naga (2005-04-11), Correcting Malayalam Digit Zero glyph and adding Malayalam numerics
1.0.0	U+0D02..0D03, 0D05..0D0C, 0D0E..0D10, 0D12..0D28, 0D2A..0D39, 0D3E..0D43, 0D46..0D48, 0D4A..0D4D, 0D57, 0D60..0D61, 0D66..0D6F	78		L2/05-104		Ganesan, Naga (2005-04-29), Malayalam zero glyph (background information)
1.0.0	U+0D02..0D03, 0D05..0D0C, 0D0E..0D10, 0D12..0D28, 0D2A..0D39, 0D3E..0D43, 0D46..0D48, 0D4A..0D4D, 0D57, 0D60..0D61, 0D66..0D6F	78		L2/05-152		Constable, Peter (2005-05-12), Malayalam numeric forms
1.0.0	U+0D02..0D03, 0D05..0D0C, 0D0E..0D10, 0D12..0D28, 0D2A..0D39, 0D3E..0D43, 0D46..0D48, 0D4A..0D4D, 0D57, 0D60..0D61, 0D66..0D6F	78		L2/05-162		McGowan, Rick (2005-06-07), Public Review Issue #71, Questions on Malayalam Digits
1.0.0	U+0D02..0D03, 0D05..0D0C, 0D0E..0D10, 0D12..0D28, 0D2A..0D39, 0D3E..0D43, 0D46..0D48, 0D4A..0D4D, 0D57, 0D60..0D61, 0D66..0D6F	78		L2/05-165		Sreekumar, P. (2005-07-05), Proposal to change the glyph of Malayalam Digit Zero
1.0.0	U+0D02..0D03, 0D05..0D0C, 0D0E..0D10, 0D12..0D28, 0D2A..0D39, 0D3E..0D43, 0D46..0D48, 0D4A..0D4D, 0D57, 0D60..0D61, 0D66..0D6F	78		L2/05-164		Sulochana, K. G. (2005-07-08), Evidence for the correct symbols used for zero,10,100,1000 and fractions in Malayalam
1.0.0	U+0D02..0D03, 0D05..0D0C, 0D0E..0D10, 0D12..0D28, 0D2A..0D39, 0D3E..0D43, 0D46..0D48, 0D4A..0D4D, 0D57, 0D60..0D61, 0D66..0D6F	78		L2/05-201		McGowan, Rick (2005-08-04), Public Review Issue #71: Questions on Malayalam Digits [duplicate of L2/05-162]
1.0.0	U+0D02..0D03, 0D05..0D0C, 0D0E..0D10, 0D12..0D28, 0D2A..0D39, 0D3E..0D43, 0D46..0D48, 0D4A..0D4D, 0D57, 0D60..0D61, 0D66..0D6F	78		L2/05-180		Moore, Lisa (2005-08-17), "Consensus 104-C18", UTC #104 Minutes, "Change the glyph for U+0D66 MALAYALAM DIGIT ZERO to be ellipsoid as documented in L2/05-165 and L2/05-201."
1.0.0	U+0D02..0D03, 0D05..0D0C, 0D0E..0D10, 0D12..0D28, 0D2A..0D39, 0D3E..0D43, 0D46..0D48, 0D4A..0D4D, 0D57, 0D60..0D61, 0D66..0D6F	78		L2/05-296	N2971	Umamaheswaran, V. S. (2005-08-23), Correct the glyph shape of Malayalam digit zero - Editorial Corrigendum
1.0.0	U+0D02..0D03, 0D05..0D0C, 0D0E..0D10, 0D12..0D28, 0D2A..0D39, 0D3E..0D43, 0D46..0D48, 0D4A..0D4D, 0D57, 0D60..0D61, 0D66..0D6F	78		L2/05-108R		Moore, Lisa (2005-08-26), "Consensus 103-C12", UTC #103 Minutes, "Make a Public Review Issue out of the requested change to the glyph for Malayalam digit 0 and the request to add three numeric characters."
1.0.0	U+0D02..0D03, 0D05..0D0C, 0D0E..0D10, 0D12..0D28, 0D2A..0D39, 0D3E..0D43, 0D46..0D48, 0D4A..0D4D, 0D57, 0D60..0D61, 0D66..0D6F	78			N2953 (pdf, doc)	Umamaheswaran, V. S. (2006-02-16), "11.2 Correct glyph shape for Malayalam digit zero", Unconfirmed minutes of WG 2 meeting 47, Sophia Antipolis, France; 2005-09-12/15
5.1	U+0D3D, 0D44, 0D62, 0D79	4		L2/05-309R	N3015	Chitrajakumar, R. (2005-10-24), Proposal for addition of characters to Malayalam Block
5.1	U+0D3D, 0D44, 0D62, 0D79	4		L2/05-279		Moore, Lisa (2005-11-10), "C.1", UTC #105 Minutes
5.1	U+0D3D, 0D44, 0D62, 0D79	4		L2/06-166		Ganesan, Naga (2006-05-08), MALAYALAM SIGN AVAGRAHA and MALAYALAM DAY SIGN in Unicode (0D00-0D7F)
5.1	U+0D3D, 0D44, 0D62, 0D79	4		L2/06-108		Moore, Lisa (2006-05-25), "C.3", UTC #107 Minutes
5.1	U+0D3D, 0D44, 0D62, 0D79	4			N3103 (pdf, doc)	Umamaheswaran, V. S. (2006-08-25), "M48.18", Unconfirmed minutes of WG 2 meeting 48, Mountain View, CA, USA; 2006-04-24/27
5.1	U+0D3D, 0D44, 0D62, 0D79	4			N3153 (pdf, doc)	Umamaheswaran, V. S. (2007-02-16), "M49.1b [U+0D3D]", Unconfirmed minutes of WG 2 meeting 49 AIST, Akihabara, Tokyo, Japan; 2006-09-25/29
5.1	U+0D3D, 0D44, 0D62, 0D79	4		L2/09-378		Lata, Swaran (2009-10-27), Encoding of Dot Reph of Malyalam and Change in glyph for Avagraha in Malyalam
5.1	U+0D3D, 0D44, 0D62, 0D79	4		L2/15-174		A, Srinidhi; A, Sridatta (2015-07-16), Request to change the representative glyph of MALAYALAM VOWEL SIGN VOCALIC RR
5.1	U+0D3D, 0D44, 0D62, 0D79	4		L2/15-204		Anderson, Deborah; et al. (2015-07-25), "4. Malayalam", Recommendations to UTC #144 July 2015 on Script Proposals
5.1	U+0D3D, 0D44, 0D62, 0D79	4		L2/15-187		Moore, Lisa (2015-08-11), "Consensus 144-C7", UTC #144 Minutes, "Change the representative glyph for U+0D44 MALAYALAM VOWEL SIGN VOCALIC RR, to one as described in L2/15-174 at the bottom of page 1."
5.1	U+0D63	1		L2/07-095R	N3235R	Everson, Michael; Scharf, Peter; Angot, Michel; Chandrashekar, R.; Hyman, Malcolm; Rosenfield, Susan; Sastry, B. V. Venkatakrishna; Witzel, Michael (2007-04-13), Proposal to encode characters for Vedic Sanskrit in the BMP of the UCS
5.1	U+0D63	1		L2/07-118R2		Moore, Lisa (2007-05-23), "111-C17", UTC #111 Minutes
5.1	U+0D63	1		L2/07-196	N3272	Everson, Michael (2007-05-25), Proposal to encode four characters for Oriya and Malayalam
5.1	U+0D63	1		L2/07-268	N3253 (pdf, doc)	Umamaheswaran, V. S. (2007-07-26), "M50.23", Unconfirmed minutes of WG 2 meeting 50, Frankfurt-am-Main, Germany; 2007-04-24/27
5.1	U+0D70..0D75	6		L2/05-087		Ganesan, Naga (2005-04-11), Correcting Malayalam Digit Zero glyph and adding Malayalam numerics
5.1	U+0D70..0D75	6		L2/05-162		McGowan, Rick (2005-06-07), Public Review Issue #71, Questions on Malayalam Digits
5.1	U+0D70..0D75	6		L2/05-164		Sulochana, K. G. (2005-07-08), Evidence for the correct symbols used for zero,10,100,1000 and fractions in Malayalam
5.1	U+0D70..0D75	6		L2/05-173		Johny, Cibu C. (2005-07-21), Malayalam related topics (PRI #71)
5.1	U+0D70..0D75	6		L2/05-175		Sreekumar, P. (2005-07-29), Proposal to includes Malayalam Numbers as distinct characters
5.1	U+0D70..0D75	6		L2/05-201		McGowan, Rick (2005-08-04), Public Review Issue #71: Questions on Malayalam Digits [duplicate of L2/05-162]
5.1	U+0D70..0D75	6		L2/05-180		Moore, Lisa (2005-08-17), "Malayalam (C.5.1), Malayalam Digits (B.11.3)", UTC #104 Minutes
5.1	U+0D70..0D75	6		L2/05-295	N2970	Umamaheswaran, V. S. (2005-08-23), Proposal to add 3 Malayalam Numbers 10, 100, 1000 and 3 Fraction symbols 1/4, 1/2 and 3/4
5.1	U+0D70..0D75	6		L2/05-108R		Moore, Lisa (2005-08-26), "Consensus 103-C12", UTC #103 Minutes, "Make a Public Review Issue out of the requested change to the glyph for Malayalam digit 0 and the request to add three numeric characters."
5.1	U+0D70..0D75	6		L2/05-249		Proposal to include Malayalam Symbols, 2005-09-06
5.1	U+0D70..0D75	6			N2953 (pdf, doc)	Umamaheswaran, V. S. (2006-02-16), "M47.21", Unconfirmed minutes of WG 2 meeting 47, Sophia Antipolis, France; 2005-09-12/15
5.1	U+0D7A..0D7F	6		L2/03-102		Vikas, Om (2003-03-04), Unicode Standard for Indic Scripts
5.1	U+0D7A..0D7F	6		L2/03-101.6		Proposed Changes in Indic Scripts [Malayalam document], 2003-03-04
5.1	U+0D7A..0D7F	6		L2/03-113		Everson, Michael (2003-03-05), Conjuncts: making sure we are right
5.1	U+0D7A..0D7F	6		L2/03-309		Rajkumar, S. (2003-09-09), Unicode Malayalam rendering page
5.1	U+0D7A..0D7F	6		L2/04-279		Constable, Peter (2004-06-30), Proposal on Clarification and Consolidation of the Function of ZERO WIDTH JOINER in Indic Scripts
5.1	U+0D7A..0D7F	6		L2/04-328		Leca, Antoine (2004-08-04), Response to Public Review Issue #37
5.1	U+0D7A..0D7F	6		L2/04-418		Muller, Eric (2004-11-18), "Malayalam chillus", Report of the Indic ad-hoc
5.1	U+0D7A..0D7F	6		L2/04-361		Moore, Lisa (2004-11-23), "101-A104", UTC #101 Minutes
5.1	U+0D7A..0D7F	6		L2/05-081		Pai, Mahesh T. (2005-03-17), Chilling effects of the Chillu: Encoding Problems in Malayalam (background doc)
5.1	U+0D7A..0D7F	6		L2/05-085		Johny, Cibu C. (2005-05-02), Encoding of Chillu forms in Malayalam (PRI #66 feedback)
5.1	U+0D7A..0D7F	6		L2/05-112		McGowan, Rick (2005-05-03), Public Review Issue #66, Encoding of chillu forms in Malayalam (background doc)
5.1	U+0D7A..0D7F	6		L2/05-148		Muller, Eric (2005-05-11), Comments on PRI 66: Mayalam cillaksarams
5.1	U+0D7A..0D7F	6		L2/05-154		Constable, Peter (2005-05-13), Malayalam chillu ka
5.1	U+0D7A..0D7F	6		L2/05-210		Chitrajakumar, R.; Gangadharan, N. (2005-08-05), Chandrakkala. Samvruthokaram. Chillaksharam, from the perspective of Malayalam Collation
5.1	U+0D7A..0D7F	6		L2/05-213		Chitrajakumar, R.; Gangadharan, N. (2005-08-07), Samvruthokaram and Chandrakkala
5.1	U+0D7A..0D7F	6		L2/05-214		Chitrajakumar, R.; Gangadharan, N. (2005-08-07), Chillaksharam of Malayalam Language
5.1	U+0D7A..0D7F	6		L2/05-236		Malayalam Language -- Inclusion of Chillu characters, 2005-08-23
5.1	U+0D7A..0D7F	6		L2/05-108R		Moore, Lisa (2005-08-26), "Malayalam Chillu Forms (B.11.5), Malayalam Chillu Ka (B.11.5.1.4)", UTC #103 Minutes
5.1	U+0D7A..0D7F	6		L2/05-246		Vikas, Om (2005-08-31), Letter to Mark Davis from Om Vikas re Malayalam Chillus
5.1	U+0D7A..0D7F	6		L2/05-307		Sebastian, Rajeev J.; Vedi, Rachana Akshara (2005-10-21), ZWJ/ZWNJ behavior under Indic scripts with special reference to chillu, conjuncts, etc in Malayalam
5.1	U+0D7A..0D7F	6		L2/05-308		Chitrajakumar, R.; Gangadharan, N.; Vedi, Rachana Akshara (2005-10-21), Problems of Malayalam Encoding in the Indic context (Rachana's response to Malayalam encoding debate)
5.1	U+0D7A..0D7F	6		L2/05-310		Chitrajakumar, R. (2005-10-24), Rachana Documents (cover letter for L2/05-307, 308, 309)
5.1	U+0D7A..0D7F	6		L2/05-334		Johny, Cibu C. (2005-10-25), Critical review of Rachana (L2/05-210) and other arguments to encode Malayalam Chillus
5.1	U+0D7A..0D7F	6		L2/05-354		Chitrajakumar, R.; Gangadharan, N. (2005-10-28), Chillu and Semivowel examples
5.1	U+0D7A..0D7F	6		L2/05-372		Pai, Mahesh T. (2005-11-17), Chillus, Samvrithòkaram and Chandrakkala - A Problem Which is Not
5.1	U+0D7A..0D7F	6		L2/06-134		Ganesan, Naga (2006-04-17), Dravidian script "markers" code-points in Unicode
5.1	U+0D7A..0D7F	6		L2/06-189		The Chillu Issue, 2006-05-12
5.1	U+0D7A..0D7F	6		L2/06-190		Annexure 1 - Chillu Evidence, 2 pages, 2006-05-12
5.1	U+0D7A..0D7F	6		L2/06-207	N3126	Muller, Eric (2006-05-14), Malayalam Chillaksarams
5.1	U+0D7A..0D7F	6		L2/06-218		Chitrajakumar, R. (2006-05-19), Malayalam Chillu Encoding (e-mail to McGowan, Muller, Umamaheswaran, et al)
5.1	U+0D7A..0D7F	6		L2/06-108		Moore, Lisa (2006-05-25), "Consensus 107-C52", UTC #107 Minutes
5.1	U+0D7A..0D7F	6		L2/06-247		Umamaheswaran, V. S. (2006-07-27), Proposal to revise names for Malayalam chillus
5.1	U+0D7A..0D7F	6		L2/06-261		Ganesan, Naga (2006-07-31), Proposal to encode Malayalam Consonant Sign Cillu
5.1	U+0D7A..0D7F	6		L2/06-270		Ganesan, Naga (2006-07-31), Cillaksharam R and a comment on Cillu letter names (L2/06-247)
5.1	U+0D7A..0D7F	6		L2/06-296		Achuthanandan, V. S. (2006-08-10), Letter to Mark Davis re Malayalam encoding
5.1	U+0D7A..0D7F	6		L2/06-231		Moore, Lisa (2006-08-17), "C.10", UTC #108 Minutes
5.1	U+0D7A..0D7F	6			N3153 (pdf, doc)	Umamaheswaran, V. S. (2007-02-16), "M49.21", Unconfirmed minutes of WG 2 meeting 49 AIST, Akihabara, Tokyo, Japan; 2006-09-25/29
5.1	U+0D7A..0D7F	6		L2/06-396		Chitrajakumar, R.; et al. (2006-11-20), Chillu encoding is wrong
5.1	U+0D7A..0D7F	6		L2/07-034		Sam, N. (2007-01-18), Workshop - The Problems in Unicode Encoding of Malayalam
5.1	U+0D7A..0D7F	6		L2/07-031		Achuthanandan, V. S. (2007-01-30), Letter from Chief Minister Achuthanandan (Kerala) to Mark Davis re Malayalam Chillu encoding
5.1	U+0D7A..0D7F	6		L2/07-035		Sebastian, Rajeev J.; Vedi, Rachana Akshara (2007-01-30), Atomic chillus causes spoofing
5.1	U+0D7A..0D7F	6		L2/07-036		Johny, Cibu C. (2007-01-30), Malayalam - Comparison of Chillu Encoding Proposals
5.1	U+0D7A..0D7F	6		L2/07-038		Johny, Cibu C. (2007-01-30), Malayalam - Representation of Vowellessness
5.1	U+0D7A..0D7F	6		L2/07-041		Johny, Cibu C. (2007-01-30), Malayalam - PR 96 feedback
5.1	U+0D7A..0D7F	6		L2/07-057		Sam, N. (2007-02-02), Report of the Workshop on Problems of Unicode encoding of Malayalam conducted at University of Kerala on January 24-25, 2007
5.1	U+0D7A..0D7F	6		L2/07-062		Sebastian, Rajeev J. (2007-02-05), Letter from Rajeev J Sebasian to Mark Davis re Malayalam Encoding
5.1	U+0D7A..0D7F	6		L2/07-061		Sebastian, Rajeev J. (2007-02-06), Notes on PRI #96 Feedback
5.1	U+0D7A..0D7F	6		L2/07-064		Mohanan, K. P. (2007-02-06), Theoretical and Practical Aspects of Chillus in Malayalam
5.1	U+0D7A..0D7F	6		L2/07-065		Mangalat, Mahesh (2007-02-06), Atomic Chillu Encoding Issue
5.1	U+0D7A..0D7F	6		L2/07-066		Lata, Swaran (2007-02-07), Letter from Swaran Lata supporting Chillu Encoding
5.1	U+0D7A..0D7F	6		L2/07-090		Johny, Cibu C. (2007-02-22), Visuals and corresponding storage representations of the edge cases in Malayalam
5.1	U+0D7A..0D7F	6		L2/07-129		Johny, Cibu (2007-04-21), Changes related to Malayalam in Unicode 5.1.0 from 5.0
5.1	U+0D7A..0D7F	6		L2/07-272		Muller, Eric (2007-08-10), "1", Report of the South Asia subcommittee
5.1	U+0D7A..0D7F	6		L2/07-279		Ganesan, Naga (2007-08-13), Joiners (ZWJ/ZWNJ) with semantic content for words in Indian subcontinent languages
5.1	U+0D7A..0D7F	6		L2/07-225		Moore, Lisa (2007-08-21), "Malayalam", UTC #112 Minutes
5.1	U+0D7A..0D7F	6		L2/07-393		Johny, Cibu (2007-10-18), Correction to L2/07-090, L2/07-129 on how Malayalam Chillus used in boundary cases
5.1	U+0D7A..0D7F	6		L2/07-402		Johny, Cibu (2007-10-19), Malayalam Chillus in grapheme clusters
5.1	U+0D7A..0D7F	6		L2/08-038		A, Praveen; Aravind, Anivar; Thottingal, Santhosh; M, Baiju (2008-01-28), Atomic chillu's are Unacceptable
5.1	U+0D7A..0D7F	6		L2/08-040		Ganesan, Naga (2008-01-28), Comments on L2/07-402: Malayalam Chillus in Grapheme clusters
5.1	U+0D7A..0D7F	6		L2/08-041		Ganesan, Naga (2008-01-28), Malayalam Reph with ZWJ joiner
5.1	U+0D7A..0D7F	6		L2/08-076 (pdf, txt)		McGowan, Rick (2008-01-29), Malayalam Feedback from the Online Reporting Form
5.1	U+0D7A..0D7F	6		L2/13-036		Pournader, Roozbeh; Johny, Cibu (2013-01-29), Old and New Chillus in Malayalam and implications for Sinhala
6.0	U+0D29, 0D3A	2		L2/12-021	N4216	Sharma, Shriramana (2002-01-12), Request to change the representative glyph of 0D3A MALAYALAM LETTER TTTA
6.0	U+0D29, 0D3A	2			N3353 (pdf, doc)	Umamaheswaran, V. S. (2007-10-10), "M51.32", Unconfirmed minutes of WG 2 meeting 51 Hanzhou, China; 2007-04-24/27
6.0	U+0D29, 0D3A	2		L2/08-325	N3494	Everson, Michael (2007-08-14), Proposal to add two characters for Malayalam to the BMP
6.0	U+0D29, 0D3A	2		L2/07-283	N3295	Everson, Michael (2007-08-17), Proposal to add three characters for Malayalam to the BMP
6.0	U+0D29, 0D3A	2		L2/08-218		Muller, Eric (2008-05-12), "4", South Asia Subcommittee Report - Monday May 12, 2008
6.0	U+0D29, 0D3A	2		L2/08-161R2		Moore, Lisa (2008-11-05), "Malayalam", UTC #115 Minutes
6.0	U+0D29, 0D3A	2		L2/08-412	N3553 (pdf, doc)	Umamaheswaran, V. S. (2008-11-05), "M53.24c", Unconfirmed minutes of WG 2 meeting 53
6.0	U+0D29, 0D3A	2		L2/09-341		Sharma, Shriramana (2009-10-06), Request for annotations to be added to Malayalam NNNA and TTTA
6.0	U+0D29, 0D3A	2		L2/12-031		Anderson, Deborah; McGowan, Rick; Whistler, Ken (2012-01-27), "VI. MALAYALAM", Review of Indic-related L2 documents and Recommendations to the UTC
6.0	U+0D4E (Note: See also L2/07-090, L2/07-129, L2/07-393, L2/07-402, and L2/08-041)	1		L2/07-037		Johny, Cibu C. (2007-01-30), Malayalam - Dot Reph
6.0	U+0D4E	1		L2/08-069		Sulochana, K. G. (2008-01-28), Comments on the Malayalam related text in Unicode 5.1.0
6.0	U+0D4E	1		L2/08-076 (pdf, txt)		McGowan, Rick (2008-01-29), Malayalam Feedback from the Online Reporting Form
6.0	U+0D4E	1		L2/08-020		Johny, Cibu; Nair, Umesh (2008-01-30), Malayalam: Comparison of Dot-Reph Proposals in 5.1
6.0	U+0D4E	1		L2/08-195		Ganesan, Naga (2008-05-02), Dot-Reph and Subscript YA/VA Sequences in Malayalam Unicode
6.0	U+0D4E	1		L2/08-306		Johny, Cibu (2008-08-08), Malayalam: Comparison of Dot-Reph Proposals
6.0	U+0D4E	1		L2/09-056		Johny, Cibu (2008-08-08), Malayalam: Comparison of Dot-Reph Proposals (Re: L2/08-411)
6.0	U+0D4E	1		L2/09-072		Jain, Manoj (2009-02-02), GOI inputs on Representation of Malayalam Dot Reph
6.0	U+0D4E	1		L2/09-178		Johny, Cibu (2009-05-01), Proposal to encode Malayalam Dot-Reph character
6.0	U+0D4E	1		L2/09-245R	N3676	Johny, Cibu (2009-05-01), Proposal to encode Malayalam Dot-Reph character
6.0	U+0D4E	1		L2/09-196		Ganesan, Naga (2009-05-04), Comment on L2/09-178: Malayalam Dot-Reph
6.0	U+0D4E	1		L2/09-203		Ganesan, Naga (2009-05-08), Deprecated Telugu and Malayalam reph sequences
6.0	U+0D4E	1		L2/09-104		Moore, Lisa (2009-05-20), "E.8.1", UTC #119 / L2 #216 Minutes
6.0	U+0D4E	1		L2/09-378		Lata, Swaran (2009-10-27), Encoding of Dot Reph of Malyalam and Change in glyph for Avagraha in Malyalam
6.0	U+0D4E	1			N3703 (pdf, doc)	Umamaheswaran, V. S. (2010-04-13), "M55.9c", Unconfirmed minutes of WG 2 meeting no. 55, Tokyo 2009-10-26/30
6.0	U+0D4E	1		L2/12-106		Sharma, Shriramana (2012-03-17), "3. Malayalam", Request for editorial updates to various Indic scripts
6.0	U+0D4E	1		L2/12-147		Anderson, Deborah; McGowan, Rick; Whistler, Ken (2012-04-25), "III. MALAYALAM", Review of Indic-related L2 documents and Recommendations to the UTC
6.0	U+0D4E	1		L2/12-164		Sharma, Shriramana (2012-05-02), "2. Malayalam", Further editorial updates for Indic
6.0	U+0D4E	1		L2/15-183R		Pournader, Roozbeh (2015-07-28), Candidate characters for Grapheme_Cluster_Break=Prepend
6.0	U+0D4E	1		L2/15-187		Moore, Lisa (2015-08-11), "Consensus 144-C6", UTC #144 Minutes, "Change the Grapheme_Cluster_Break property of the 12 characters listed in L2/15-183R to "Prepend" for Unicode 9.0."
7.0	U+0D01	1		L2/10-392R2	N3964	Sharma, Shriramana (2010-10-11), Request to encode South Indian CANDRABINDU-s
7.0	U+0D01	1		L2/10-440		Anderson, Deborah; McGowan, Rick; Whistler, Ken (2010-10-27), "5. South Indian Candrabindus", Review of Indic-related L2 documents and Recommendations to the UTC
7.0	U+0D01	1		L2/10-416R		Moore, Lisa (2010-11-09), "South Indian candrabindu-s (D.8)", UTC #125 / L2 #222 Minutes
7.0	U+0D01	1			N4103	"11.2.4 South Indian CANDRABINDU-s", Unconfirmed minutes of WG 2 meeting 58, 2012-01-03
8.0	U+0D5F	1		L2/12-225	N4312	Sharma, Shriramana (2012-05-22), Proposal to encode 0D5F MALAYALAM LETTER ARCHAIC II
8.0	U+0D5F	1		L2/12-233		Rajan, Vinodh (2012-07-17), Comments on Encoding "Duplicate" Indic Characters
8.0	U+0D5F	1		L2/12-267		Anderson, Deborah; McGowan, Rick; Whistler, Ken (2012-07-21), "III. MALAYALAM", Review of Indic-related documents and Recommendations to the UTC
8.0	U+0D5F	1		L2/12-273		Ganesan, Naga (2012-07-25), Comment on archaic Malayalam glyph II encoding & Grantha writing of Dravidian languages
8.0	U+0D5F	1		L2/12-239		Moore, Lisa (2012-08-14), "D.8", UTC #132 Minutes
8.0	U+0D5F	1			N4353 (pdf, doc)	"M60.17", Unconfirmed minutes of WG 2 meeting 60, 2013-05-23
9.0	U+0D4F	1		L2/13-058		Moore, Lisa (2013-06-12), "D.6.1", UTC #135 Minutes
9.0	U+0D4F	1		L2/14-016	N4538	Johny, Cibu (2014-01-16), Proposal to encode MALAYALAM SIGN PARA
9.0	U+0D4F	1		L2/14-053		Anderson, Deborah; Whistler, Ken; McGowan, Rick; Pournader, Roozbeh; Iancu, Laurențiu (2014-01-26), "13", Recommendations to UTC #138 February 2014 on Script Proposals
9.0	U+0D4F	1		L2/14-026		Moore, Lisa (2014-02-17), "D.4.5", UTC #138 Minutes
9.0	U+0D4F	1		L2/14-135		Sharma, Shriramana (2014-05-07), Request to move the Malayalam Sign Para from 0D65 to 0D4F
9.0	U+0D4F	1		L2/14-100		Moore, Lisa (2014-05-13), "Motion 139-M2", UTC #139 Minutes, "Move Malayalam Sign Para from U+0D65 to U+0D4F."
9.0	U+0D4F	1			N4553 (pdf, doc)	Umamaheswaran, V. S. (2014-09-16), "10.3.3.2", Minutes of WG 2 meeting 62 Adobe, San Jose, CA, USA
9.0	U+0D54	1		L2/14-013	N4540	Johny, Cibu (2014-01-08), Proposal to encode MALAYALAM LETTER CHILLU M
9.0	U+0D54	1		L2/14-053		Anderson, Deborah; Whistler, Ken; McGowan, Rick; Pournader, Roozbeh; Iancu, Laurențiu (2014-01-26), "12", Recommendations to UTC #138 February 2014 on Script Proposals
9.0	U+0D54	1		L2/14-026		Moore, Lisa (2014-02-17), "D.4.2", UTC #138 Minutes
9.0	U+0D54	1			N4553 (pdf, doc)	Umamaheswaran, V. S. (2014-09-16), "M62.09a, M62.09g", Minutes of WG 2 meeting 62 Adobe, San Jose, CA, USA
9.0	U+0D55	1		L2/06-337		Ganesan, Naga (2006-10-20), Malayalam cillaksharam YA
9.0	U+0D55	1			N3353 (pdf, doc)	Umamaheswaran, V. S. (2007-10-10), "M51.32", Unconfirmed minutes of WG 2 meeting 51 Hanzhou, China; 2007-04-24/27
9.0	U+0D55	1		L2/07-242		Johny, Cibu (2007-07-31), Proposal to encode Malayalam Chillu YA in the UCS
9.0	U+0D55	1		L2/07-272		Muller, Eric (2007-08-10), "4", Report of the South Asia subcommittee
9.0	U+0D55	1		L2/07-283	N3295	Everson, Michael (2007-08-17), Proposal to add three characters for Malayalam to the BMP
9.0	U+0D55	1		L2/08-161R2		Moore, Lisa (2008-11-05), "Malayalam", UTC #115 Minutes
9.0	U+0D55	1		L2/14-053		Anderson, Deborah; Whistler, Ken; McGowan, Rick; Pournader, Roozbeh; Iancu, Laurențiu (2014-01-26), "11", Recommendations to UTC #138 February 2014 on Script Proposals
9.0	U+0D55	1			N4553 (pdf, doc)	Umamaheswaran, V. S. (2014-09-16), "M62.09a, M62.09g", Minutes of WG 2 meeting 62 Adobe, San Jose, CA, USA
9.0	U+0D55	1		L2/14-017	N4539	Johny, Cibu (2014-12-26), Proposal to encode MALAYALAM LETTER CHILLU Y
9.0	U+0D56	1		L2/13-063R	N4428	Johny, Cibu (2013-05-15), Proposal to encode MALAYALAM LETTER CHILLU LLL
9.0	U+0D56	1			N4403 (pdf, doc)	Umamaheswaran, V. S. (2014-01-28), "10.3.11 Malayalam Chillu LLL", Unconfirmed minutes of WG 2 meeting 61, Holiday Inn, Vilnius, Lithuania; 2013-06-10/14
9.0	U+0D56	1		L2/14-026		Moore, Lisa (2014-02-17), "D.4.6", UTC #138 Minutes
9.0	U+0D56	1			N4553 (pdf, doc)	Umamaheswaran, V. S. (2014-09-16), "M62.09a, M62.09g", Minutes of WG 2 meeting 62 Adobe, San Jose, CA, USA
9.0	U+0D58..0D5E, 0D76..0D78	10		L2/05-249		Proposal to include Malayalam Symbols, 2005-09-06
9.0	U+0D58..0D5E, 0D76..0D78	10		L2/06-260		Ganesan, Naga (2006-07-31), Malayalam Fractions and Letter-Numerals
9.0	U+0D58..0D5E, 0D76..0D78	10		L2/13-051R	N4429	Sharma, Shriramana (2013-04-25), Proposal to encode Malayalam minor fractions
9.0	U+0D58..0D5E, 0D76..0D78	10		L2/13-076		Sharma, Shriramana (2013-04-25), Questions re the Malayalam fractions proposal
9.0	U+0D58..0D5E, 0D76..0D78	10		L2/13-086		Anderson, Deborah; McGowan, Rick; Whistler, Ken; Pournader, Roozbeh (2013-04-26), "15", Recommendations to UTC on Script Proposals
9.0	U+0D58..0D5E, 0D76..0D78	10		L2/13-124		Kumar, Rajendra (2013-05-10), Letter from Gov't of India to Lisa Moore re recent documents
9.0	U+0D58..0D5E, 0D76..0D78	10		L2/13-058		Moore, Lisa (2013-06-12), "D.6.2", UTC #135 Minutes
9.0	U+0D58..0D5E, 0D76..0D78	10			N4403 (pdf, doc)	Umamaheswaran, V. S. (2014-01-28), "10.3.12 Malayalam minor fractions", Unconfirmed minutes of WG 2 meeting 61, Holiday Inn, Vilnius, Lithuania; 2013-06-10/14
9.0	U+0D58..0D5E, 0D76..0D78	10			N4553 (pdf, doc)	Umamaheswaran, V. S. (2014-09-16), "M62.06c, M62.06h", Minutes of WG 2 meeting 62 Adobe, San Jose, CA, USA
10.0	U+0D00	1		L2/14-003	N4517	Sharma, Shriramana (2013-12-30), Proposal to encode 0D00 MALAYALAM SIGN COMBINING ANUSVARA ABOVE
10.0	U+0D00	1		L2/14-029		Johny, Cibu (2014-01-20), Feedback on Malayalam Anusvara Above Proposal
10.0	U+0D00	1		L2/14-053		Anderson, Deborah; Whistler, Ken; McGowan, Rick; Pournader, Roozbeh; Iancu, Laurențiu (2014-01-26), "7", Recommendations to UTC #138 February 2014 on Script Proposals
10.0	U+0D00	1		L2/14-069		Sharma, Shriramana (2014-02-17), Evidence for considerable usage of the Malayalam anusvara above
10.0	U+0D00	1			N4553 (pdf, doc)	Umamaheswaran, V. S. (2014-09-16), "10.3.3.1", Minutes of WG 2 meeting 62 Adobe, San Jose, CA, USA
10.0	U+0D00	1		L2/14-268R		Anderson, Deborah; Whistler, Ken; McGowan, Rick; Pournader, Roozbeh; Iancu, Laurențiu; Glass, Andrew; Constable, Peter; Suignard, Michel (2014-10-27), "4. Malayalam", Recommendations to UTC #141 October 2014 on Script Proposals
10.0	U+0D00	1		L2/14-292		Sharma, Shriramana (2014-10-30), Clarifications re the proposed 0D00 MALAYALAM SIGN COMBINING ANUSVARA ABOVE
10.0	U+0D00	1		L2/15-011		Ganesan, Naga (2015-01-26), Comment on L2/14-003: Any need for Combining Anusvara Sign Above in Malayalam Block?
10.0	U+0D00	1		L2/15-045		Anderson, Deborah; Whistler, Ken; McGowan, Rick; Pournader, Roozbeh; Glass, Andrew (2015-01-30), "Malayalam Anusvara Above", Recommendations to UTC #142 February 2015 on Script Proposals
10.0	U+0D00	1		L2/15-017		Moore, Lisa (2015-02-12), "D.5.3.1", UTC #142 Minutes
10.0	U+0D3B	1		L2/14-053		Anderson, Deborah; Whistler, Ken; McGowan, Rick; Pournader, Roozbeh; Iancu, Laurențiu (2014-01-26), "9", Recommendations to UTC #138 February 2014 on Script Proposals
10.0	U+0D3B	1		L2/14-015		Johny, Cibu (2015-01-19), Proposal to encode MALAYALAM SIGN VERTICAL BAR VIRAMA
10.0	U+0D3B	1		L2/15-021		Ganesan, Naga (2015-01-27), Comment on L2/14-15R: Malayalam Sign Vertical Bar Virama (Chillu Virama Sign)
10.0	U+0D3B	1		L2/15-045		Anderson, Deborah; Whistler, Ken; McGowan, Rick; Pournader, Roozbeh; Glass, Andrew (2015-01-30), "Vertical Bar Virama", Recommendations to UTC #142 February 2015 on Script Proposals
10.0	U+0D3B	1		L2/15-017		Moore, Lisa (2015-02-12), "D.5.4.1", UTC #142 Minutes
10.0	U+0D3C	1		L2/14-053		Anderson, Deborah; Whistler, Ken; McGowan, Rick; Pournader, Roozbeh; Iancu, Laurențiu (2014-01-26), "10", Recommendations to UTC #138 February 2014 on Script Proposals
10.0	U+0D3C	1		L2/14-014R		Johny, Cibu (2015-01-19), Proposal to encode MALAYALAM SIGN CIRCULAR VIRAMA
10.0	U+0D3C	1		L2/15-024		Ganesan, Naga (2015-01-27), Comment on Malayalam circular Virama sign
10.0	U+0D3C	1		L2/15-045		Anderson, Deborah; Whistler, Ken; McGowan, Rick; Pournader, Roozbeh; Glass, Andrew (2015-01-30), "Circular Virama Sign", Recommendations to UTC #142 February 2015 on Script Proposals
10.0	U+0D3C	1		L2/15-017		Moore, Lisa (2015-02-12), "D.5.5.1", UTC #142 Minutes
13.0	U+0D04	1		L2/17-276R	N4965R	A, Srinidhi; A, Sridatta (2017-12-08), Proposal to encode MALAYALAM LETTER VEDIC ANUSVARA
13.0	U+0D04	1		L2/17-419		Sharma, Shriramana (2017-12-05), Feedback on Malayalam Vedic Anusvara
13.0	U+0D04	1		L2/18-039		Anderson, Deborah; Whistler, Ken; Pournader, Roozbeh; Moore, Lisa; Liang, Hai; Cook, Richard (2018-01-19), "b. Malayalam Vedic Anusvara", Recommendations to UTC #154 January 2018 on Script Proposals
13.0	U+0D04	1		L2/18-168		Anderson, Deborah; Whistler, Ken; Pournader, Roozbeh; Moore, Lisa; Liang, Hai; Chapman, Chris; Cook, Richard (2018-04-28), "31. Malayalam Vedic Anusvara", Recommendations to UTC #155 April-May 2018 on Script Proposals
13.0	U+0D04	1		L2/18-115		Moore, Lisa (2018-05-09), "D.7.1", UTC #155 Minutes
13.0	U+0D04	1		L2/18-183		Moore, Lisa (2018-11-20), "B.1.3.1.1.1", UTC #156 Minutes
13.0	U+0D04	1			N5020 (pdf, doc)	Umamaheswaran, V. S. (2019-01-11), "10.3.15", Unconfirmed minutes of WG 2 meeting 67
13.0	U+0D04	1		L2/20-052		Pournader, Roozbeh (2020-01-15), Changes to Identifier_Type of some Unicode 13.0 characters
13.0	U+0D04	1		L2/20-015R		Moore, Lisa (2020-05-14), "B.13.4 Changes to Identifier_Type of some Unicode 13.0 characters", Draft Minutes of UTC Meeting 162
