= Bengali (Unicode block) =

Unicode block

- Range: U+0980..U+09FF (128 code points)
- Plane: BMP
- Scripts: Bengali
- Major alphabets: Bengali, Assamese
- Assigned: 96 code points
- Unused: 32 reserved code points
- Source standards: ISCII

Unicode Version History
- 1.0.0 (1991): 89 (+89)
- 4.0 (2003): 90 (+1)
- 4.1 (2005): 91 (+1)
- 5.2 (2009): 92 (+1)
- 7.0 (2014): 93 (+1)
- 10.0 (2017): 95 (+2)
- 11.0 (2018): 96 (+1)

Unicode documentation
- Code chart ∣ Web page

Bengali Unicode block contains characters for the Bengali, Assamese, Bishnupriya Manipuri, Daphla, Garo, Hallam, Khasi, Mizo, Munda, Naga, Riang, and Santali languages. In its original incarnation, the code points U+0981..U+09CD were a direct copy of the Bengali characters A1-ED from the 1988 ISCII standard, as well as several Assamese ISCII characters in the U+09F0 column. The Devanagari, Gurmukhi, Gujarati, Oriya, Tamil, Telugu, Kannada, and Malayalam blocks were similarly all based on ISCII encodings.

== Block ==
Bengali^{[1]}^{[2]} Official Unicode Consortium code chart (PDF)
	0	1	2	3	4	5	6	7	8	9	A	B	C	D	E	F
U+098x	ঀ	ঁ	ং	ঃ		অ	আ	ই	ঈ	উ	ঊ	ঋ	ঌ			এ
U+099x	ঐ			ও	ঔ	ক	খ	গ	ঘ	ঙ	চ	ছ	জ	ঝ	ঞ	ট
U+09Ax	ঠ	ড	ঢ	ণ	ত	থ	দ	ধ	ন		প	ফ	ব	ভ	ম	য
U+09Bx	র		ল				শ	ষ	স	হ			়	ঽ	া	ি
U+09Cx	ী	ু	ূ	ৃ	ৄ			ে	ৈ			ো	ৌ	্	ৎ	
U+09Dx								ৗ					ড়	ঢ়		য়
U+09Ex	ৠ	ৡ	ৢ	ৣ			০	১	২	৩	৪	৫	৬	৭	৮	৯
U+09Fx	ৰ	ৱ	৲	৳	৴	৵	৶	৷	৸	৹	৺	৻	ৼ	৽	৾	
Notes 1.As of Unicode version 18.0 2.Grey areas indicate non-assigned code points

== History ==
The following Unicode-related documents record the purpose and process of defining specific characters in the Bengali block:

Version	Final code points (Note: Proposed code points and characters names may differ from final code points and names)	Count	UTC ID	L2 ID	WG2 ID	Document
1.0.0	U+0981..0983, 0985..098C, 098F..0990, 0993..09A8, 09AA..09B0, 09B2, 09B6..09B9, 09BC, 09BE..09C4, 09C7..09C8, 09CB..09CD, 09D7, 09DC..09DD, 09DF..09E3, 09E6..09FA	89	UTC/1991-056			Whistler, Ken, Indic Charts: Devanagari, Bengali, Gurmukhi, Gujarati, Oriya, Tamil, Telugu, Kannada, Malayalam
1.0.0	U+0981..0983, 0985..098C, 098F..0990, 0993..09A8, 09AA..09B0, 09B2, 09B6..09B9, 09BC, 09BE..09C4, 09C7..09C8, 09CB..09CD, 09D7, 09DC..09DD, 09DF..09E3, 09E6..09FA	89	UTC/1991-057			Whistler, Ken, Indic names list
1.0.0	U+0981..0983, 0985..098C, 098F..0990, 0993..09A8, 09AA..09B0, 09B2, 09B6..09B9, 09BC, 09BE..09C4, 09C7..09C8, 09CB..09CD, 09D7, 09DC..09DD, 09DF..09E3, 09E6..09FA	89	UTC/1991-048B			Whistler, Ken (1991-03-27), "III. L. Walk In proposals", Draft Minutes from the UTC meeting #46 day 2, 3/27 at Apple
1.0.0	U+0981..0983, 0985..098C, 098F..0990, 0993..09A8, 09AA..09B0, 09B2, 09B6..09B9, 09BC, 09BE..09C4, 09C7..09C8, 09CB..09CD, 09D7, 09DC..09DD, 09DF..09E3, 09E6..09FA	89		L2/01-303		Vikas, Om (2001-07-26), Letter from the Government from India on "Draft for Unicode Standard for Indian Scripts"
1.0.0	U+0981..0983, 0985..098C, 098F..0990, 0993..09A8, 09AA..09B0, 09B2, 09B6..09B9, 09BC, 09BE..09C4, 09C7..09C8, 09CB..09CD, 09D7, 09DC..09DD, 09DF..09E3, 09E6..09FA	89		L2/01-304		Feedback on Unicode Standard 3.0, 2001-08-02
1.0.0	U+0981..0983, 0985..098C, 098F..0990, 0993..09A8, 09AA..09B0, 09B2, 09B6..09B9, 09BC, 09BE..09C4, 09C7..09C8, 09CB..09CD, 09D7, 09DC..09DD, 09DF..09E3, 09E6..09FA	89		L2/01-305		McGowan, Rick (2001-08-08), Draft UTC Response to L2/01-304, "Feedback on Unicode Standard 3.0"
1.0.0	U+0981..0983, 0985..098C, 098F..0990, 0993..09A8, 09AA..09B0, 09B2, 09B6..09B9, 09BC, 09BE..09C4, 09C7..09C8, 09CB..09CD, 09D7, 09DC..09DD, 09DF..09E3, 09E6..09FA	89		L2/01-430R		McGowan, Rick (2001-11-20), UTC Response to L2/01-304, "Feedback on Unicode Standard 3.0"
1.0.0	U+0981..0983, 0985..098C, 098F..0990, 0993..09A8, 09AA..09B0, 09B2, 09B6..09B9, 09BC, 09BE..09C4, 09C7..09C8, 09CB..09CD, 09D7, 09DC..09DD, 09DF..09E3, 09E6..09FA	89		L2/03-113		Everson, Michael (2003-03-05), Conjuncts: making sure we are right
1.0.0	U+0981..0983, 0985..098C, 098F..0990, 0993..09A8, 09AA..09B0, 09B2, 09B6..09B9, 09BC, 09BE..09C4, 09C7..09C8, 09CB..09CD, 09D7, 09DC..09DD, 09DF..09E3, 09E6..09FA	89		L2/08-288		Whistler, Ken (2008-08-04), Public Review Issue #123: Bengali Currency Numerator Values
1.0.0	U+0981..0983, 0985..098C, 098F..0990, 0993..09A8, 09AA..09B0, 09B2, 09B6..09B9, 09BC, 09BE..09C4, 09C7..09C8, 09CB..09CD, 09D7, 09DC..09DD, 09DF..09E3, 09E6..09FA	89		L2/08-361		Moore, Lisa (2008-12-02), "Bengali Currency Numerator Values (B.11.1)", UTC #117 Minutes
1.0.0	U+0981..0983, 0985..098C, 098F..0990, 0993..09A8, 09AA..09B0, 09B2, 09B6..09B9, 09BC, 09BE..09C4, 09C7..09C8, 09CB..09CD, 09D7, 09DC..09DD, 09DF..09E3, 09E6..09FA	89		L2/09-225R		Moore, Lisa (2009-08-17), "E.1.2", UTC #120 / L2 #217 Minutes
1.0.0	U+0981..0983, 0985..098C, 098F..0990, 0993..09A8, 09AA..09B0, 09B2, 09B6..09B9, 09BC, 09BE..09C4, 09C7..09C8, 09CB..09CD, 09D7, 09DC..09DD, 09DF..09E3, 09E6..09FA	89		L2/20-055		Pournader, Roozbeh (2020-01-16), Proposed sequences for composition exclusions
1.0.0	U+0981..0983, 0985..098C, 098F..0990, 0993..09A8, 09AA..09B0, 09B2, 09B6..09B9, 09BC, 09BE..09C4, 09C7..09C8, 09CB..09CD, 09D7, 09DC..09DD, 09DF..09E3, 09E6..09FA	89		L2/20-015R		Moore, Lisa (2020-05-14), "B.13.1.1 Proposed sequences for composition exclusions", Draft Minutes of UTC Meeting 162
4.0	U+09BD	1		L2/01-431R (Note: See also L2/01-303, L2/01-304, L2/01-305, and L2/01-430R)		McGowan, Rick (2001-11-08), Actions for UTC and Editorial Committee in response to L2/01-430R
4.0	U+09BD	1		L2/01-405R		Moore, Lisa (2001-12-12), "Consensus 89-C19", Minutes from the UTC/L2 meeting in Mountain View, November 6-9, 2001, "Accept the twelve Indic characters with names and coding positions as documented in L2/01-431R"
4.0	U+09BD	1		L2/02-117	N2425	McGowan, Rick (2002-03-21), Additional Characters for Indic Scripts
4.0	U+09BD	1		L2/03-084		Jain, Manoj (2003-03-03), Proposed changes in the Unicode Standards for Indic Scripts - Bengali
4.0	U+09BD	1		L2/03-102		Vikas, Om (2003-03-04), Unicode Standard for Indic Scripts
4.0	U+09BD	1		L2/03-101.1		Proposed Changes in Indic Scripts [Bengali document], 2003-03-04
4.0	U+09BD	1		L2/03-104		Jain, Manoj (2003-03-04), Sample Text for Bengali Sign Avagraha
4.0	U+09BD	1		L2/04-102		Pavanaja, U. B. (2004-02-10), Bug in Kannada collation
4.0	U+09BD	1		L2/04-432		Wissink, Cathy (2004-12-31), Indic collation: action items 99-20 and 99-29
4.1	U+09CE	1		L2/00-303	N2261	Incorporation of Bangla (Bengali) Coded Character in ISO/IEC 10646-1, 2000-08-23
4.1	U+09CE	1		L2/00-304	N2261-1	Proposal Summary Form for character U+09BA, KHANDATA, 2000-08-23
4.1	U+09CE	1		L2/01-050	N2253	Umamaheswaran, V. S. (2001-01-21), "7.12 Proposal to synchronize Bengali standard with 10646", Minutes of the SC2/WG2 meeting in Athens, September 2000
4.1	U+09CE	1		L2/03-084		Jain, Manoj (2003-03-03), Proposed changes in the Unicode Standards for Indic Scripts - Bengali
4.1	U+09CE	1		L2/03-102		Vikas, Om (2003-03-04), Unicode Standard for Indic Scripts
4.1	U+09CE	1		L2/03-101.1		Proposed Changes in Indic Scripts [Bengali document], 2003-03-04
4.1	U+09CE	1		L2/04-060		Sengupta, Gautam (2004-02-01), Encoding Bangla Khanda-Ta With Ta+Virama
4.1	U+09CE	1		L2/04-062		Constable, Peter (2004-02-01), Encoding Bangla Khanda-Ta With Ta+Virama
4.1	U+09CE	1		L2/04-102		Pavanaja, U. B. (2004-02-10), Bug in Kannada collation
4.1	U+09CE	1		L2/04-262	N2810	Constable, Peter (2004-02-17), Encoding of Bengali Khanda Ta in Unicode (PRI #30 document)
4.1	U+09CE	1		L2/04-192	N2811	Sengupta, Gautam (2004-06-07), Feedback on PR-30: Encoding of Bangla Khanda Ta in Unicode
4.1	U+09CE	1		L2/04-233	N2812	Vikas, Om (2004-06-10), Letter to Mark Davis re Bengali Khanda Ta
4.1	U+09CE	1		L2/04-252	N2813	Constable, Peter (2004-06-15), Review of Bengali Khanda Ta and PRI-30 Feedback
4.1	U+09CE	1		L2/04-264	N2809	Constable, Peter (2004-06-17), Proposal to encode Bengali Khanda Ta in the UCS
4.1	U+09CE	1		L2/04-432		Wissink, Cathy (2004-12-31), Indic collation: action items 99-20 and 99-29
5.2	U+09FB	1			N3353 (pdf, doc)	Umamaheswaran, V. S. (2007-10-10), "M51.18", Unconfirmed minutes of WG 2 meeting 51 Hanzhou, China; 2007-04-24/27
5.2	U+09FB	1		L2/07-192	N3311	Pandey, Anshuman (2007-05-21), Proposal to Encode the Ganda Currency Mark for Bengali in the BMP of the UCS
5.2	U+09FB	1		L2/07-225		Moore, Lisa (2007-08-21), "Bengali", UTC #112 Minutes
7.0	U+0980	1		L2/11-359		Pandey, Anshuman (2011-10-21), Proposal to Encode the Sign Anji for Bengali
7.0	U+0980	1		L2/11-403		Anderson, Deborah; McGowan, Rick; Whistler, Ken (2011-10-26), "IV. BENGALI", Review of Indic-related L2 documents and Recommendations to the UTC
7.0	U+0980	1		L2/11-408		Lata, Swaran (2011-10-27), Letter from Swaran Lata, Gov't of India, re proposals
7.0	U+0980	1		L2/12-079		Lata, Swaran (2012-02-07), Inputs of Govt. of India on various documents
7.0	U+0980	1		L2/12-121	N4157	Pandey, Anshuman (2012-04-23), Proposal to Encode the Sign ANJI for Bengali
7.0	U+0980	1		L2/12-147		Anderson, Deborah; McGowan, Rick; Whistler, Ken (2012-04-25), "VII. BENGALI", Review of Indic-related L2 documents and Recommendations to the UTC
7.0	U+0980	1		L2/12-184		Lata, Swaran (2012-05-07), GOI Feedback on the various Indic related documents
7.0	U+0980	1		L2/12-277		Lata, Swaran (2012-07-26), GOI Feedback on the various Indic related document submitted to UTC
10.0	U+09FC	1		L2/15-204		Anderson, Deborah; et al. (2015-07-25), "3. Bengali", Recommendations to UTC #144 July 2015 on Script Proposals
10.0	U+09FC	1		L2/15-161		Sharma, Shriramana (2015-07-31), Proposal to encode 09CF BENGALI LETTER VEDIC ANUSVARA
10.0	U+09FC	1		L2/15-187		Moore, Lisa (2015-08-11), "D.6.1", UTC #144 Minutes
10.0	U+09FC	1			N4739	"M64.06", Unconfirmed minutes of WG 2 meeting 64, 2016-08-31
10.0	U+09FD	1		L2/15-172R		A, Srinidhi; A, Sridatta (2015-07-09), Proposal to Encode an Abbreviation Sign for Bengali
10.0	U+09FD	1		L2/15-204		Anderson, Deborah; et al. (2015-07-25), "3. Bengali", Recommendations to UTC #144 July 2015 on Script Proposals
10.0	U+09FD	1		L2/15-187		Moore, Lisa (2015-08-11), "D.6.2", UTC #144 Minutes
10.0	U+09FD	1			N4739	"M64.06", Unconfirmed minutes of WG 2 meeting 64, 2016-08-31
11.0	U+09FE	1		L2/16-322	N4808	A, Srinidhi; A, Sridatta (2016-11-01), Proposal to encode the SANDHI MARK for Bengali
11.0	U+09FE	1		L2/17-037		Anderson, Deborah; Whistler, Ken; Pournader, Roozbeh; Glass, Andrew; Iancu, Laurențiu; Moore, Lisa; Liang, Hai; Ishida, Richard; Misra, Karan; McGowan, Rick (2017-01-21), "4. Bengali", Recommendations to UTC #150 January 2017 on Script Proposals
11.0	U+09FE	1		L2/17-016		Moore, Lisa (2017-02-08), "D.3.2", UTC #150 Minutes
11.0	U+09FE	1		L2/17-130		Anderson, Deborah (2017-04-19), Comments on L2/16-322 and L2/16-383, Sandhi marks for Bengali and Newa
11.0	U+09FE	1		L2/17-153		Anderson, Deborah (2017-05-17), "4. Bengali and Newa", Recommendations to UTC #151 May 2017 on Script Proposals
11.0	U+09FE	1		L2/17-103		Moore, Lisa (2017-05-18), "D.3 Sandhi Mark", UTC #151 Minutes

== See also ==
- Bengali Supplement (Unicode block)
