= Gujarati (Unicode block) =

- Range: U+0A80..U+0AFF (128 code points)
- Plane: BMP
- Scripts: Gujarati
- Major alphabets: Gujarati
- Assigned: 91 code points
- Unused: 37 reserved code points
- Source standards: ISCII

Unicode version history
- 1.0.0 (1991): 75 (+75)
- 1.1 (1993): 78 (+3)
- 4.0 (2003): 83 (+5)
- 6.1 (2012): 84 (+1)
- 8.0 (2015): 85 (+1)
- 10.0 (2017): 91 (+6)

Unicode documentation
- Code chart ∣ Web page

Gujarati is a Unicode block containing characters for writing the Gujarati language. In its original incarnation, the code points U+0A81..U+0AD0 were a direct copy of the Gujarati characters A1-F0 from the 1988 ISCII standard. The Devanagari, Bengali, Gurmukhi, Oriya, Tamil, Telugu, Kannada, and Malayalam blocks were similarly all based on their ISCII encodings.

== Block ==
Gujarati^{[1]}^{[2]} Official Unicode Consortium code chart (PDF)
	0	1	2	3	4	5	6	7	8	9	A	B	C	D	E	F
U+0A8x		ઁ	ં	ઃ		અ	આ	ઇ	ઈ	ઉ	ઊ	ઋ	ઌ	ઍ		એ
U+0A9x	ઐ	ઑ		ઓ	ઔ	ક	ખ	ગ	ઘ	ઙ	ચ	છ	જ	ઝ	ઞ	ટ
U+0AAx	ઠ	ડ	ઢ	ણ	ત	થ	દ	ધ	ન		પ	ફ	બ	ભ	મ	ય
U+0ABx	ર		લ	ળ		વ	શ	ષ	સ	હ			઼	ઽ	ા	િ
U+0ACx	ી	ુ	ૂ	ૃ	ૄ	ૅ		ે	ૈ	ૉ		ો	ૌ	્		
U+0ADx	ૐ															
U+0AEx	ૠ	ૡ	ૢ	ૣ			૦	૧	૨	૩	૪	૫	૬	૭	૮	૯
U+0AFx	૰	૱								ૹ	ૺ	ૻ	ૼ	૽	૾	૿
Notes: 1. As of Unicode version 17.0; 2. Grey areas indicate non-assigned code points

== History ==
The following Unicode-related documents record the purpose and process of defining specific characters in the Gujarati block:

Version	Final code points (Note: Proposed code points and characters names may differ from final code points and names)	Count	UTC ID	L2 ID	WG2 ID	Document
1.0.0	U+0A81..0A83, 0A85..0A8B, 0A8F..0A90, 0A93..0AA8, 0AAA..0AB0, 0AB2..0AB3, 0AB5..0AB9, 0ABC..0AC5, 0AC7..0AC8, 0ACB..0ACD, 0AD0, 0AE0, 0AE6..0AEF	75	UTC/1991-056			Whistler, Ken, Indic Charts: Devanagari, Bengali, Gurmukhi, Gujarati, Oriya, Tamil, Telugu, Kannada, Malayalam
1.0.0	U+0A81..0A83, 0A85..0A8B, 0A8F..0A90, 0A93..0AA8, 0AAA..0AB0, 0AB2..0AB3, 0AB5..0AB9, 0ABC..0AC5, 0AC7..0AC8, 0ACB..0ACD, 0AD0, 0AE0, 0AE6..0AEF	75	UTC/1991-057			Whistler, Ken, Indic names list
1.0.0	U+0A81..0A83, 0A85..0A8B, 0A8F..0A90, 0A93..0AA8, 0AAA..0AB0, 0AB2..0AB3, 0AB5..0AB9, 0ABC..0AC5, 0AC7..0AC8, 0ACB..0ACD, 0AD0, 0AE0, 0AE6..0AEF	75	UTC/1991-048B			Whistler, Ken (1991-03-27), "III. L. Walk In proposals", Draft Minutes from the UTC meeting #46 day 2, 3/27 at Apple
1.0.0	U+0A81..0A83, 0A85..0A8B, 0A8F..0A90, 0A93..0AA8, 0AAA..0AB0, 0AB2..0AB3, 0AB5..0AB9, 0ABC..0AC5, 0AC7..0AC8, 0ACB..0ACD, 0AD0, 0AE0, 0AE6..0AEF	75		L2/01-303		Vikas, Om (2001-07-26), Letter from the Government from India on "Draft for Unicode Standard for Indian Scripts"
1.0.0	U+0A81..0A83, 0A85..0A8B, 0A8F..0A90, 0A93..0AA8, 0AAA..0AB0, 0AB2..0AB3, 0AB5..0AB9, 0ABC..0AC5, 0AC7..0AC8, 0ACB..0ACD, 0AD0, 0AE0, 0AE6..0AEF	75		L2/01-304		Feedback on Unicode Standard 3.0, 2001-08-02
1.0.0	U+0A81..0A83, 0A85..0A8B, 0A8F..0A90, 0A93..0AA8, 0AAA..0AB0, 0AB2..0AB3, 0AB5..0AB9, 0ABC..0AC5, 0AC7..0AC8, 0ACB..0ACD, 0AD0, 0AE0, 0AE6..0AEF	75		L2/01-305		McGowan, Rick (2001-08-08), Draft UTC Response to L2/01-304, "Feedback on Unicode Standard 3.0"
1.0.0	U+0A81..0A83, 0A85..0A8B, 0A8F..0A90, 0A93..0AA8, 0AAA..0AB0, 0AB2..0AB3, 0AB5..0AB9, 0ABC..0AC5, 0AC7..0AC8, 0ACB..0ACD, 0AD0, 0AE0, 0AE6..0AEF	75		L2/01-430R		McGowan, Rick (2001-11-20), UTC Response to L2/01-304, "Feedback on Unicode Standard 3.0"
1.1	U+0A8D, 0A91, 0AC9	3				(to be determined)
4.0	U+0A8C, 0AE1..0AE3, 0AF1	5		L2/01-431R (Note: See also L2/01-303, L2/01-304, L2/01-305, and L2/01-430R)		McGowan, Rick (2001-11-08), Actions for UTC and Editorial Committee in response to L2/01-430R
4.0	U+0A8C, 0AE1..0AE3, 0AF1	5		L2/01-405R		Moore, Lisa (2001-12-12), "Consensus 89-C19", Minutes from the UTC/L2 meeting in Mountain View, November 6-9, 2001, "Accept the twelve Indic characters with names and coding positions as documented in L2/01-431R"
4.0	U+0A8C, 0AE1..0AE3, 0AF1	5		L2/02-117	N2425	McGowan, Rick (2002-03-21), Additional Characters for Indic Scripts
4.0	U+0A8C, 0AE1..0AE3, 0AF1	5		L2/03-102		Vikas, Om (2003-03-04), Unicode Standard for Indic Scripts
4.0	U+0A8C, 0AE1..0AE3, 0AF1	5		L2/03-101.3		Proposed Changes in Indic Scripts [Gujarati document], 2003-03-04
4.0	U+0A8C, 0AE1..0AE3, 0AF1	5		L2/09-331		Pandey, Anshuman (2009-10-07), Proposal to Deprecate GUJARATI RUPEE SIGN
4.0	U+0A8C, 0AE1..0AE3, 0AF1	5		L2/10-015R		Moore, Lisa (2010-02-09), "Action item 122-A73", UTC #122 / L2 #219 Minutes, "Add an annotation to U+0AF1 indicating the preferred spelling for the Rupee sign, in a future version of the standard."
6.1	U+0AF0	1		L2/00-417		Cooper, M. N., Unicode Representation of Indian Scripts
6.1	U+0AF0	1		L2/03-101.3		Proposed Changes in Indic Scripts [Gujarati document], 2003-03-04
6.1	U+0AF0	1		L2/09-330	N3764	Pandey, Anshuman (2009-10-02), Proposal to Encode An Abbreviation Sign for Gujarati
6.1	U+0AF0	1		L2/10-068	N3810	Anderson, Deborah (2010-02-05), "T.8", Document requesting new additions to 10646
6.1	U+0AF0	1		L2/10-015R		Moore, Lisa (2010-02-09), "Consensus 122-C25", UTC #122 / L2 #219 Minutes
6.1	U+0AF0	1			N3803 (pdf, doc)	"M56.08e", Unconfirmed minutes of WG 2 meeting no. 56, 2010-09-24
8.0	U+0AF9	1		L2/13-066		Rajan, Vinodh (2013-04-23), Proposal to encode Gujarati Sign Triple Nukta
8.0	U+0AF9	1		L2/13-086		Anderson, Deborah; McGowan, Rick; Whistler, Ken; Pournader, Roozbeh (2013-04-26), "9", Recommendations to UTC on Script Proposals
8.0	U+0AF9	1		L2/13-143	N4473	Rajan, Vinodh (2013-07-16), Proposal to encode Gujarati Letter ZHA
8.0	U+0AF9	1		L2/13-165		Anderson, Deborah; Whistler, Ken; Pournader, Roozbeh (2013-07-25), "Gujarati", Recommendations to UTC on Script Proposals
8.0	U+0AF9	1		L2/13-132		Moore, Lisa (2013-07-29), "D.4", UTC #136 Minutes
8.0	U+0AF9	1			N4553 (pdf, doc)	Umamaheswaran, V. S. (2014-09-16), "M62.04a", Minutes of WG 2 meeting 62 Adobe, San Jose, CA, USA
10.0	U+0AFA..0AFF	6		L2/14-131	N4574	Pandey, Anshuman (2014-05-02), Proposal to Encode Gujarati Signs for the Transliteration of Arabic
10.0	U+0AFA..0AFF	6		L2/15-149		Anderson, Deborah; Whistler, Ken; McGowan, Rick; Pournader, Roozbeh; Pandey, Anshuman; Glass, Andrew (2015-05-03), "4. Gujarati", Recommendations to UTC #143 May 2015 on Script Proposals
10.0	U+0AFA..0AFF	6		L2/15-107		Moore, Lisa (2015-05-12), "D.7.1", UTC #143 Minutes
10.0	U+0AFA..0AFF	6		L2/15-103R		Pandey, Anshuman (2015-06-02), Revised Proposal to Encode Gujarati Signs for the Transliteration of Arabic
