= Telugu (Unicode block) =

- Range: U+0C00..U+0C7F (128 code points)
- Plane: BMP
- Scripts: Telugu
- Major alphabets: Telugu; Gondi; Lambadi
- Assigned: 101 code points
- Unused: 27 reserved code points
- Source standards: ISCII

Unicode version history
- 1.0.0 (1991): 80 (+80)
- 5.1 (2008): 93 (+13)
- 7.0 (2014): 95 (+2)
- 8.0 (2015): 96 (+1)
- 11.0 (2018): 97 (+1)
- 12.0 (2019): 98 (+1)
- 14.0 (2021): 100 (+2)
- 17.0 (2025): 101 (+1)

Unicode documentation
- Code chart ∣ Web page

Telugu is a Unicode block containing characters for the Telugu, Gondi, and Lambadi languages of Indian states of Andhra Pradesh and Telangana. In its original incarnation, the code points U+0C01..U+0C4D were a direct copy of the Telugu characters A1-ED from the 1988 ISCII standard. The Devanagari, Bengali, Gurmukhi, Gujarati, Oriya, Tamil, Kannada, and Malayalam blocks were similarly all based on their ISCII encodings.

== Block ==
Telugu^{[1]}^{[2]} Official Unicode Consortium code chart (PDF)
	0	1	2	3	4	5	6	7	8	9	A	B	C	D	E	F
U+0C0x	ఀ	ఁ	ం	ః	ఄ	అ	ఆ	ఇ	ఈ	ఉ	ఊ	ఋ	ఌ		ఎ	ఏ
U+0C1x	ఐ		ఒ	ఓ	ఔ	క	ఖ	గ	ఘ	ఙ	చ	ఛ	జ	ఝ	ఞ	ట
U+0C2x	ఠ	డ	ఢ	ణ	త	థ	ద	ధ	న		ప	ఫ	బ	భ	మ	య
U+0C3x	ర	ఱ	ల	ళ	ఴ	వ	శ	ష	స	హ			఼	ఽ	ా	ి
U+0C4x	ీ	ు	ూ	ృ	ౄ		ె	ే	ై		ొ	ో	ౌ	్		
U+0C5x						ౕ	ౖ		ౘ	ౙ	ౚ		౜	ౝ		
U+0C6x	ౠ	ౡ	ౢ	ౣ			౦	౧	౨	౩	౪	౫	౬	౭	౮	౯
U+0C7x								౷	౸	౹	౺	౻	౼	౽	౾	౿
Notes: 1. As of Unicode version 17.0; 2. Grey areas indicate non-assigned code points

== History ==
The following Unicode-related documents record the purpose and process of defining specific characters in the Telugu block:

Version	Final code points (Note: Proposed code points and characters names may differ from final code points and names)	Count	UTC ID	L2 ID	WG2 ID	Document
1.0.0	U+0C01..0C03, 0C05..0C0C, 0C0E..0C10, 0C12..0C28, 0C2A..0C33, 0C35..0C39, 0C3E..0C44, 0C46..0C48, 0C4A..0C4D, 0C55..0C56, 0C60..0C61, 0C66..0C6F	80	UTC/1991-056			Whistler, Ken, Indic Charts: Devanagari, Bengali, Gurmukhi, Gujarati, Oriya, Tamil, Telugu, Kannada, Malayalam
1.0.0	U+0C01..0C03, 0C05..0C0C, 0C0E..0C10, 0C12..0C28, 0C2A..0C33, 0C35..0C39, 0C3E..0C44, 0C46..0C48, 0C4A..0C4D, 0C55..0C56, 0C60..0C61, 0C66..0C6F	80	UTC/1991-057			Whistler, Ken, Indic names list
1.0.0	U+0C01..0C03, 0C05..0C0C, 0C0E..0C10, 0C12..0C28, 0C2A..0C33, 0C35..0C39, 0C3E..0C44, 0C46..0C48, 0C4A..0C4D, 0C55..0C56, 0C60..0C61, 0C66..0C6F	80	UTC/1991-048B			Whistler, Ken (1991-03-27), "III. L. Walk In proposals", Draft Minutes from the UTC meeting #46 day 2, 3/27 at Apple
1.0.0	U+0C01..0C03, 0C05..0C0C, 0C0E..0C10, 0C12..0C28, 0C2A..0C33, 0C35..0C39, 0C3E..0C44, 0C46..0C48, 0C4A..0C4D, 0C55..0C56, 0C60..0C61, 0C66..0C6F	80		L2/01-303		Vikas, Om (2001-07-26), Letter from the Government from India on "Draft for Unicode Standard for Indian Scripts"
1.0.0	U+0C01..0C03, 0C05..0C0C, 0C0E..0C10, 0C12..0C28, 0C2A..0C33, 0C35..0C39, 0C3E..0C44, 0C46..0C48, 0C4A..0C4D, 0C55..0C56, 0C60..0C61, 0C66..0C6F	80		L2/01-304		Feedback on Unicode Standard 3.0, 2001-08-02
1.0.0	U+0C01..0C03, 0C05..0C0C, 0C0E..0C10, 0C12..0C28, 0C2A..0C33, 0C35..0C39, 0C3E..0C44, 0C46..0C48, 0C4A..0C4D, 0C55..0C56, 0C60..0C61, 0C66..0C6F	80		L2/01-305		McGowan, Rick (2001-08-08), Draft UTC Response to L2/01-304, "Feedback on Unicode Standard 3.0"
1.0.0	U+0C01..0C03, 0C05..0C0C, 0C0E..0C10, 0C12..0C28, 0C2A..0C33, 0C35..0C39, 0C3E..0C44, 0C46..0C48, 0C4A..0C4D, 0C55..0C56, 0C60..0C61, 0C66..0C6F	80		L2/01-430R		McGowan, Rick (2001-11-20), UTC Response to L2/01-304, "Feedback on Unicode Standard 3.0"
5.1	U+0C3D, 0C58..0C59, 0C62..0C63, 0C78..0C7F	13		L2/03-102		Vikas, Om (2003-03-04), Unicode Standard for Indic Scripts
5.1	U+0C3D, 0C58..0C59, 0C62..0C63, 0C78..0C7F	13		L2/03-101.9		Proposed Changes in Indic Scripts [Telugu document], 2003-03-04
5.1	U+0C3D, 0C58..0C59, 0C62..0C63, 0C78..0C7F	13		L2/06-250R (Note: See also L2/01-303, L2/01-304, L2/01-305, and L2/01-430R)	N3116R	Everson, Michael; Kolichala, Suresh; Venna, Nagarjuna (2006-08-02), Proposal to add eighteen characters for Telugu to the BMP
5.1	U+0C3D, 0C58..0C59, 0C62..0C63, 0C78..0C7F	13		L2/06-267		Ganesan, Naga (2006-07-31), Comments on L2/06-250, Proposal to add eighteen characters for Telugu to the BMP of the UCS
5.1	U+0C3D, 0C58..0C59, 0C62..0C63, 0C78..0C7F	13		L2/06-231		Moore, Lisa (2006-08-17), "C.12.1", UTC #108 Minutes
5.1	U+0C3D, 0C58..0C59, 0C62..0C63, 0C78..0C7F	13			N3153 (pdf, doc)	Umamaheswaran, V. S. (2007-02-16), "M49.2", Unconfirmed minutes of WG 2 meeting 49 AIST, Akihabara, Tokyo, Japan; 2006-09-25/29
5.1	U+0C3D, 0C58..0C59, 0C62..0C63, 0C78..0C7F	13		L2/06-324R2		Moore, Lisa (2006-11-29), "Consensus 109-C1, C.6.1", UTC #109 Minutes
7.0	U+0C00	1		L2/10-392R2	N3964	Sharma, Shriramana (2010-10-11), Request to encode South Indian CANDRABINDU-s
7.0	U+0C00	1		L2/10-440		Anderson, Deborah; McGowan, Rick; Whistler, Ken (2010-10-27), "5. South Indian Candrabindus", Review of Indic-related L2 documents and Recommendations to the UTC
7.0	U+0C00	1		L2/10-416R		Moore, Lisa (2010-11-09), "South Indian candrabindu-s (D.8)", UTC #125 / L2 #222 Minutes
7.0	U+0C00	1			N4103	"11.2.4 South Indian CANDRABINDU-s", Unconfirmed minutes of WG 2 meeting 58, 2012-01-03
7.0	U+0C34	1		L2/12-015	N4214	Sharma, Shriramana; Kolichala, Suresh; Venna, Nagarjuna; Rajan, Vinodh (2012-01-17), Proposal to encode 0C34 TELUGU LETTER LLLA
7.0	U+0C34	1		L2/12-031		Anderson, Deborah; McGowan, Rick; Whistler, Ken (2012-01-27), "3. TELUGU LETTER LLLA", Review of Indic-related L2 documents and Recommendations to the UTC
7.0	U+0C34	1		L2/12-076		Govt. of Andhra Pradesh's inputs on document no. L2/12-015, 2012-02-01
7.0	U+0C34	1		L2/12-007		Moore, Lisa (2012-02-14), "D.2", UTC #130 / L2 #227 Minutes
7.0	U+0C34	1			N4253 (pdf, doc)	"M59.16e", Unconfirmed minutes of WG 2 meeting 59, 2012-09-12
8.0	U+0C5A	1		L2/12-016	N4215	Sharma, Shriramana; Kolichala, Suresh; Venna, Nagarjuna; Rajan, Vinodh (2012-01-18), Proposal to encode 0C5A TELUGU LETTER RRRA
8.0	U+0C5A	1		L2/12-031		Anderson, Deborah; McGowan, Rick; Whistler, Ken (2012-01-27), "4. TELUGU LETTER RRRA", Review of Indic-related L2 documents and Recommendations to the UTC
8.0	U+0C5A	1		L2/13-028		Anderson, Deborah; McGowan, Rick; Whistler, Ken; Pournader, Roozbeh (2013-01-28), "20", Recommendations to UTC on Script Proposals
8.0	U+0C5A	1		L2/13-121		Kolichala, Suresh (2013-05-09), Letter from Andhra Pradesh re Telugu RRRA
8.0	U+0C5A	1		L2/13-058		Moore, Lisa (2013-06-12), "Consensus 135-C20", UTC #135 Minutes, "Accept U+0C5A TELUGU LETTER RRRA for encoding in a future version of the standard, with properties as given in L2/12-016."
8.0	U+0C5A	1			N4403 (pdf, doc)	Umamaheswaran, V. S. (2014-01-28), "10.3.2 Telugu Letter RRRA", Unconfirmed minutes of WG 2 meeting 61, Holiday Inn, Vilnius, Lithuania; 2013-06-10/14
11.0	U+0C04	1		L2/16-285	N4798	A, Srinidhi; A, Sridatta (2016-10-20), Proposal to encode the TELUGU SIGN COMBINING ANUSVARA ABOVE
11.0	U+0C04	1		L2/16-342		Anderson, Deborah; Whistler, Ken; Pournader, Roozbeh; Glass, Andrew; Iancu, Laurențiu (2016-11-07), "3", Recommendations to UTC #149 November 2016 on Script Proposals
11.0	U+0C04	1		L2/16-325		Moore, Lisa (2016-11-18), "D.3", UTC #149 Minutes
12.0	U+0C77	1		L2/17-218R	N4860	A, Srinidhi; A, Sridatta (2017-07-17), Proposal to encode the TELUGU SIGN SIDDHAM
12.0	U+0C77	1		L2/17-255		Anderson, Deborah; Whistler, Ken; Pournader, Roozbeh; Moore, Lisa; Liang, Hai (2017-07-28), "12. Telugu", Recommendations to UTC #152 July-August 2017 on Script Proposals
12.0	U+0C77	1		L2/17-222		Moore, Lisa (2017-08-11), "D.13", UTC #152 Minutes
12.0	U+0C77	1			N4953 (pdf, doc)	"M66.16a", Unconfirmed minutes of WG 2 meeting 66, 2018-03-23
14.0	U+0C3C	1		L2/19-401		Rajan, Vinodh; Sharma, Shriramana; Kolichala, Suresh (2019-12-17), Proposal to Encode Telugu Sign Nukta
14.0	U+0C3C	1		L2/19-405		A, Srinidhi; A, Sridatta (2019-12-29), Additional evidence for the use of Nukta sign in Telugu
14.0	U+0C3C	1		L2/20-046		Anderson, Deborah; Whistler, Ken; Pournader, Roozbeh; Moore, Lisa; Liang, Hai (2020-01-10), "8. Telugu", Recommendations to UTC #162 January 2020 on Script Proposals
14.0	U+0C3C	1		L2/20-085		Rajan, Vinodh; Sharma, Shriramana; Kolichala, Suresh (2020-03-18), Revised Proposal to Encode Telugu Sign Nukta
14.0	U+0C3C	1		L2/20-105		Anderson, Deborah; Whistler, Ken; Pournader, Roozbeh; Moore, Lisa; Constable, Peter; Liang, Hai (2020-04-20), "9a. Telugu Sign Nukta", Recommendations to UTC #163 April 2020 on Script Proposals
14.0	U+0C3C	1		L2/20-102		Moore, Lisa (2020-05-06), "Consensus 163-C16", UTC #163 Minutes
14.0	U+0C5D	1		L2/20-084R		Rajan, Vinodh; Sharma, Shriramana; Kolichala, Suresh (2020-04-18), Revised Proposal to Encode Telugu Letter Nakaara Pollu
14.0	U+0C5D	1		L2/20-105		Anderson, Deborah; Whistler, Ken; Pournader, Roozbeh; Moore, Lisa; Constable, Peter; Liang, Hai (2020-04-20), "9b. Telugu Letter Nakaara Pollu", Recommendations to UTC #163 April 2020 on Script Proposals
14.0	U+0C5D	1		L2/20-102		Moore, Lisa (2020-05-06), "Consensus 163-C17", UTC #163 Minutes
17.0	U+0C5C	1		L2/22-006		A, Srinidhi; A, Sridatta (2021-12-23), Proposal to encode ARCHAIC SHRII in Kannada and Telugu
17.0	U+0C5C	1		L2/22-023		Anderson, Deborah; Whistler, Ken; Pournader, Roozbeh; Constable, Peter (2022-01-22), "9 Kannada and Telugu", Recommendations to UTC #170 January 2022 on Script Proposals
17.0	U+0C5C	1		L2/22-016		Constable, Peter (2022-04-21), "D.1 9 Kannada and Telugu", UTC #170 Minutes
17.0	U+0C5C	1		L2/24-061		Constable, Peter (2024-04-29), "B.1.1", UTC #179 Minutes
