= Kannada (Unicode block) =

- Range: U+0C80..U+0CFF (128 code points)
- Plane: BMP
- Scripts: Kannada
- Major alphabets: Kannada; Tulu
- Assigned: 92 code points
- Unused: 36 reserved code points
- Source standards: ISCII

Unicode version history
- 1.0.0 (1991): 80 (+80)
- 4.0 (2003): 82 (+2)
- 5.0 (2006): 86 (+4)
- 7.0 (2014): 87 (+1)
- 9.0 (2016): 88 (+1)
- 11.0 (2018): 89 (+1)
- 14.0 (2021): 90 (+1)
- 15.0 (2022): 91 (+1)
- 17.0 (2025): 92 (+1)

Unicode documentation
- Code chart ∣ Web page

Kannada is a Unicode block containing characters for the Kannada, Sanskrit, Konkani, Sankethi, Havyaka, Tulu and Kodava languages. In its original incarnation, the code points U+0C82..U+0CCD were a direct copy of the Kannada characters A2-ED from the 1988 ISCII standard. The Devanagari, Bengali, Gurmukhi, Gujarati, Oriya, Tamil, Telugu, and Malayalam blocks were similarly all based on their ISCII encodings.

== Block ==
Kannada^{[1]}^{[2]} Official Unicode Consortium code chart (PDF)
	0	1	2	3	4	5	6	7	8	9	A	B	C	D	E	F
U+0C8x	ಀ	ಁ	ಂ	ಃ	಄	ಅ	ಆ	ಇ	ಈ	ಉ	ಊ	ಋ	ಌ		ಎ	ಏ
U+0C9x	ಐ		ಒ	ಓ	ಔ	ಕ	ಖ	ಗ	ಘ	ಙ	ಚ	ಛ	ಜ	ಝ	ಞ	ಟ
U+0CAx	ಠ	ಡ	ಢ	ಣ	ತ	ಥ	ದ	ಧ	ನ		ಪ	ಫ	ಬ	ಭ	ಮ	ಯ
U+0CBx	ರ	ಱ	ಲ	ಳ		ವ	ಶ	ಷ	ಸ	ಹ			಼	ಽ	ಾ	ಿ
U+0CCx	ೀ	ು	ೂ	ೃ	ೄ		ೆ	ೇ	ೈ		ೊ	ೋ	ೌ	್		
U+0CDx						ೕ	ೖ						೜	ೝ	ೞ	
U+0CEx	ೠ	ೡ	ೢ	ೣ			೦	೧	೨	೩	೪	೫	೬	೭	೮	೯
U+0CFx		ೱ	ೲ	ೳ												
Notes: 1. As of Unicode version 17.0; 2. Grey areas indicate non-assigned code points

== History ==
The following Unicode-related documents record the purpose and process of defining specific characters in the Kannada block:

Version	Final code points (Note: Proposed code points and characters names may differ from final code points and names)	Count	UTC ID	L2 ID	WG2 ID	Document
1.0.0	U+0C82..0C83, 0C85..0C8C, 0C8E..0C90, 0C92..0CA8, 0CAA..0CB3, 0CB5..0CB9, 0CBE..0CC4, 0CC6..0CC8, 0CCA..0CCD, 0CD5..0CD6, 0CDE, 0CE0..0CE1, 0CE6..0CEF	80	UTC/1991-056			Whistler, Ken, Indic Charts: Devanagari, Bengali, Gurmukhi, Gujarati, Oriya, Tamil, Telugu, Kannada, Malayalam
1.0.0	U+0C82..0C83, 0C85..0C8C, 0C8E..0C90, 0C92..0CA8, 0CAA..0CB3, 0CB5..0CB9, 0CBE..0CC4, 0CC6..0CC8, 0CCA..0CCD, 0CD5..0CD6, 0CDE, 0CE0..0CE1, 0CE6..0CEF	80	UTC/1991-057			Whistler, Ken, Indic names list
1.0.0	U+0C82..0C83, 0C85..0C8C, 0C8E..0C90, 0C92..0CA8, 0CAA..0CB3, 0CB5..0CB9, 0CBE..0CC4, 0CC6..0CC8, 0CCA..0CCD, 0CD5..0CD6, 0CDE, 0CE0..0CE1, 0CE6..0CEF	80	UTC/1991-048B			Whistler, Ken (1991-03-27), "III. L. Walk In proposals", Draft Minutes from the UTC meeting #46 day 2, 3/27 at Apple
1.0.0	U+0C82..0C83, 0C85..0C8C, 0C8E..0C90, 0C92..0CA8, 0CAA..0CB3, 0CB5..0CB9, 0CBE..0CC4, 0CC6..0CC8, 0CCA..0CCD, 0CD5..0CD6, 0CDE, 0CE0..0CE1, 0CE6..0CEF	80		L2/01-303		Vikas, Om (2001-07-26), Letter from the Government from India on "Draft for Unicode Standard for Indian Scripts"
1.0.0	U+0C82..0C83, 0C85..0C8C, 0C8E..0C90, 0C92..0CA8, 0CAA..0CB3, 0CB5..0CB9, 0CBE..0CC4, 0CC6..0CC8, 0CCA..0CCD, 0CD5..0CD6, 0CDE, 0CE0..0CE1, 0CE6..0CEF	80		L2/01-304		Feedback on Unicode Standard 3.0, 2001-08-02
1.0.0	U+0C82..0C83, 0C85..0C8C, 0C8E..0C90, 0C92..0CA8, 0CAA..0CB3, 0CB5..0CB9, 0CBE..0CC4, 0CC6..0CC8, 0CCA..0CCD, 0CD5..0CD6, 0CDE, 0CE0..0CE1, 0CE6..0CEF	80		L2/01-305		McGowan, Rick (2001-08-08), Draft UTC Response to L2/01-304, "Feedback on Unicode Standard 3.0"
1.0.0	U+0C82..0C83, 0C85..0C8C, 0C8E..0C90, 0C92..0CA8, 0CAA..0CB3, 0CB5..0CB9, 0CBE..0CC4, 0CC6..0CC8, 0CCA..0CCD, 0CD5..0CD6, 0CDE, 0CE0..0CE1, 0CE6..0CEF	80		L2/01-430R		McGowan, Rick (2001-11-20), UTC Response to L2/01-304, "Feedback on Unicode Standard 3.0"
1.0.0	U+0C82..0C83, 0C85..0C8C, 0C8E..0C90, 0C92..0CA8, 0CAA..0CB3, 0CB5..0CB9, 0CBE..0CC4, 0CC6..0CC8, 0CCA..0CCD, 0CD5..0CD6, 0CDE, 0CE0..0CE1, 0CE6..0CEF	80		L2/05-137		Freytag, Asmus (2005-05-10), Handling "defective" names
1.0.0	U+0C82..0C83, 0C85..0C8C, 0C8E..0C90, 0C92..0CA8, 0CAA..0CB3, 0CB5..0CB9, 0CBE..0CC4, 0CC6..0CC8, 0CCA..0CCD, 0CD5..0CD6, 0CDE, 0CE0..0CE1, 0CE6..0CEF	80		L2/05-108R		Moore, Lisa (2005-08-26), "Consensus 103-C7", UTC #103 Minutes, "Create a "Normative Name Alias" property and file in the UCD. Populate the property with names from the sections "Typos" and "Bad or misleading names" from document L2/05-137."
1.0.0	U+0C82..0C83, 0C85..0C8C, 0C8E..0C90, 0C92..0CA8, 0CAA..0CB3, 0CB5..0CB9, 0CBE..0CC4, 0CC6..0CC8, 0CCA..0CCD, 0CD5..0CD6, 0CDE, 0CE0..0CE1, 0CE6..0CEF	80		L2/06-157		McGowan, Rick (2006-05-12), "Proposed Additional Name Aliases (BETA FEEDBACK) [U+0CDE]", Comments on Public Review Issues (January 31, 2006 - May 12, 2006)
1.0.0	U+0C82..0C83, 0C85..0C8C, 0C8E..0C90, 0C92..0CA8, 0CAA..0CB3, 0CB5..0CB9, 0CBE..0CC4, 0CC6..0CC8, 0CCA..0CCD, 0CD5..0CD6, 0CDE, 0CE0..0CE1, 0CE6..0CEF	80		L2/06-108		Moore, Lisa (2006-05-25), "B.11.10 [U+0CDE]", UTC #107 Minutes
1.0.0	U+0C82..0C83, 0C85..0C8C, 0C8E..0C90, 0C92..0CA8, 0CAA..0CB3, 0CB5..0CB9, 0CBE..0CC4, 0CC6..0CC8, 0CCA..0CCD, 0CD5..0CD6, 0CDE, 0CE0..0CE1, 0CE6..0CEF	80		L2/13-232		A, Srinidhi (2013-12-03), Request to change the Unicode chart font for Kannada
1.0.0	U+0C82..0C83, 0C85..0C8C, 0C8E..0C90, 0C92..0CA8, 0CAA..0CB3, 0CB5..0CB9, 0CBE..0CC4, 0CC6..0CC8, 0CCA..0CCD, 0CD5..0CD6, 0CDE, 0CE0..0CE1, 0CE6..0CEF	80		L2/14-053		Anderson, Deborah; Whistler, Ken; McGowan, Rick; Pournader, Roozbeh; Iancu, Laurențiu (2014-01-26), "3", Recommendations to UTC #138 February 2014 on Script Proposals
1.0.0	U+0C82..0C83, 0C85..0C8C, 0C8E..0C90, 0C92..0CA8, 0CAA..0CB3, 0CB5..0CB9, 0CBE..0CC4, 0CC6..0CC8, 0CCA..0CCD, 0CD5..0CD6, 0CDE, 0CE0..0CE1, 0CE6..0CEF	80		L2/17-041		A, Srinidhi; A, Sridatta (2017-01-22), Request to change glyphs of Kannada letters Vocalic L and Vocalic LL and their vowel signs
1.0.0	U+0C82..0C83, 0C85..0C8C, 0C8E..0C90, 0C92..0CA8, 0CAA..0CB3, 0CB5..0CB9, 0CBE..0CC4, 0CC6..0CC8, 0CCA..0CCD, 0CD5..0CD6, 0CDE, 0CE0..0CE1, 0CE6..0CEF	80		L2/17-127		Anderson, Deborah (2017-04-19), Feedback and Response on L2/17-041: Request to change glyphs of Kannada letters Vocalic L and Vocalic LL and their vowel signs
1.0.0	U+0C82..0C83, 0C85..0C8C, 0C8E..0C90, 0C92..0CA8, 0CAA..0CB3, 0CB5..0CB9, 0CBE..0CC4, 0CC6..0CC8, 0CCA..0CCD, 0CD5..0CD6, 0CDE, 0CE0..0CE1, 0CE6..0CEF	80		L2/17-160		Sharma, Shriramana (2017-05-07), On the glyph changes for Kannada Vowels Vocalic L/LL
1.0.0	U+0C82..0C83, 0C85..0C8C, 0C8E..0C90, 0C92..0CA8, 0CAA..0CB3, 0CB5..0CB9, 0CBE..0CC4, 0CC6..0CC8, 0CCA..0CCD, 0CD5..0CD6, 0CDE, 0CE0..0CE1, 0CE6..0CEF	80		L2/17-153		Anderson, Deborah (2017-05-17), "5", Recommendations to UTC #151 May 2017 on Script Proposals
1.0.0	U+0C82..0C83, 0C85..0C8C, 0C8E..0C90, 0C92..0CA8, 0CAA..0CB3, 0CB5..0CB9, 0CBE..0CC4, 0CC6..0CC8, 0CCA..0CCD, 0CD5..0CD6, 0CDE, 0CE0..0CE1, 0CE6..0CEF	80		L2/17-103		Moore, Lisa (2017-05-18), "D.6.1", UTC #151 Minutes
4.0	U+0CBC..0CBD	2		L2/01-431R (Note: See also L2/01-303, L2/01-304, L2/01-305, and L2/01-430R)		McGowan, Rick (2001-11-08), Actions for UTC and Editorial Committee in response to L2/01-430R
4.0	U+0CBC..0CBD	2		L2/01-405R		Moore, Lisa (2001-12-12), "Consensus 89-C19", Minutes from the UTC/L2 meeting in Mountain View, November 6-9, 2001, "Accept the twelve Indic characters with names and coding positions as documented in L2/01-431R"
4.0	U+0CBC..0CBD	2		L2/02-117	N2425	McGowan, Rick (2002-03-21), Additional Characters for Indic Scripts
4.0	U+0CBC..0CBD	2		L2/03-102		Vikas, Om (2003-03-04), Unicode Standard for Indic Scripts
4.0	U+0CBC..0CBD	2		L2/03-101.5		Proposed Changes in Indic Scripts [Kannada document], 2003-03-04
5.0	U+0CE2..0CE3	2		L2/04-364	N2860	Everson, Michael (2004-10-22), Proposal to add six characters for Kannada to the BMP of the UCS
5.0	U+0CE2..0CE3	2		L2/05-059		Whistler, Ken (2005-02-03), "2. Kannada additions", WG2 Consent Docket, Part 2: Unicode 5.0 Issues
5.0	U+0CE2..0CE3	2		L2/05-026		Moore, Lisa (2005-05-16), "WG2 - Unicode 5.0 Consent Docket (B.1.16)", UTC #102 Minutes
5.0	U+0CE2..0CE3	2		L2/05-279		Moore, Lisa (2005-11-10), "C.16", UTC #105 Minutes
5.0	U+0CF1..0CF2	2		L2/04-364	N2860	Everson, Michael (2004-10-22), Proposal to add six characters for Kannada to the BMP of the UCS
5.0	U+0CF1..0CF2	2		L2/05-059		Whistler, Ken (2005-02-03), "2. Kannada additions", WG2 Consent Docket, Part 2: Unicode 5.0 Issues
5.0	U+0CF1..0CF2	2		L2/05-026		Moore, Lisa (2005-05-16), "WG2 - Unicode 5.0 Consent Docket (B.1.16)", UTC #102 Minutes
5.0	U+0CF1..0CF2	2		L2/05-279		Moore, Lisa (2005-11-10), "C.16", UTC #105 Minutes
5.0	U+0CF1..0CF2	2		L2/10-167		Anderson, Deborah; McGowan, Rick; Whistler, Ken (2010-05-05), "1", Review of Indic-related L2 documents and Recommendations to the UTC
5.0	U+0CF1..0CF2	2		L2/10-108		Moore, Lisa (2010-05-19), "Consensus 123-C29", UTC #123 / L2 #220 Minutes, "Change the general category and script property of U+0CF1 KANNADA SIGN JIHVAMULIYA and U+0CF2 KANNADA SIGN UPADHMANIYA from "GC=So" to "Lo" and from "Script=Common" to "Kannada" for Unicode 6.0."
5.0	U+0CF1..0CF2	2		L2/09-342 (Note: See also L2/09-404)		Sharma, Shriramana (2010-10-09), Misrepresentation in Unicode of characters related to the Sanskrit sounds Jihvamuliya and Upadhmaniya
5.0	U+0CF1..0CF2	2		L2/13-242		A, Srinidhi (2013-12-24), Representation of Jihvamuliya and Upadhmaniya in Kannada
5.0	U+0CF1..0CF2	2		L2/14-053		Anderson, Deborah; Whistler, Ken; McGowan, Rick; Pournader, Roozbeh; Iancu, Laurențiu (2014-01-26), "2", Recommendations to UTC #138 February 2014 on Script Proposals
5.0	U+0CF1..0CF2	2		L2/14-066		Sharma, Shriramana (2014-02-07), Representation of the Brahmi and Kannada Jihvamuliya/Upadhmaniya Characters in the Code Charts
5.0	U+0CF1..0CF2	2		L2/17-041		A, Srinidhi; A, Sridatta (2017-01-22), Request to change glyphs of Kannada letters Vocalic L and Vocalic LL and their vowel signs
5.0	U+0CF1..0CF2	2		L2/17-127		Anderson, Deborah (2017-04-19), Feedback and Response on L2/17-041: Request to change glyphs of Kannada letters Vocalic L and Vocalic LL and their vowel signs
5.0	U+0CF1..0CF2	2		L2/17-160		Sharma, Shriramana (2017-05-07), On the glyph changes for Kannada Vowels Vocalic L/LL
5.0	U+0CF1..0CF2	2		L2/17-153		Anderson, Deborah (2017-05-17), "5. Kannada", Recommendations to UTC #151 May 2017 on Script Proposals
5.0	U+0CF1..0CF2	2		L2/17-103		Moore, Lisa (2017-05-18), "D.6.1", UTC #151 Minutes
7.0	U+0C81	1		L2/10-392R2	N3964	Sharma, Shriramana (2010-10-11), Request to encode South Indian CANDRABINDU-s
7.0	U+0C81	1		L2/10-440		Anderson, Deborah; McGowan, Rick; Whistler, Ken (2010-10-27), "5. South Indian Candrabindus", Review of Indic-related L2 documents and Recommendations to the UTC
7.0	U+0C81	1		L2/10-416R		Moore, Lisa (2010-11-09), "South Indian candrabindu-s (D.8)", UTC #125 / L2 #222 Minutes
7.0	U+0C81	1			N4103	"11.2.4 South Indian CANDRABINDU-s", Unconfirmed minutes of WG 2 meeting 58, 2012-01-03
9.0	U+0C80	1		L2/14-153	N4591	Rajan, Vinodh (2014-07-18), Proposal to encode Kannada Sign Spacing Candrabindu
9.0	U+0C80	1		L2/14-166		A, Srinidhi (2014-07-22), Usage of Kannada Sign Spacing Candrabindu in Vedic texts
9.0	U+0C80	1		L2/14-170		Anderson, Deborah; Whistler, Ken; McGowan, Rick; Pournader, Roozbeh; Iancu, Laurențiu (2014-07-28), "3", Recommendations to UTC #140 August 2014 on Script Proposals
9.0	U+0C80	1		L2/14-188		Sharma, Shriramana (2014-07-31), Comments on proposal for Kannada Sign Spacing Candrabindu
9.0	U+0C80	1		L2/14-177		Moore, Lisa (2014-10-17), "Kannada Spacing Candrabindu (D.6)", UTC #140 Minutes
9.0	U+0C80	1		L2/15-158		Sharma, Shriramana (2015-05-18), Attestations for Sama Vedic usage of 0C80 KANNADA SIGN SPACING CANDRABINDU
9.0	U+0C80	1		L2/15-204		Anderson, Deborah; et al. (2015-07-25), "5. Kannada", Recommendations to UTC #144 July 2015 on Script Proposals
9.0	U+0C80	1		L2/16-052	N4603 (pdf, doc)	Umamaheswaran, V. S. (2015-09-01), "M63.11p", Unconfirmed minutes of WG 2 meeting 63
11.0	U+0C84	1		L2/16-031		A, Srinidhi; A, Sridatta (2016-01-22), Proposal to encode the Kannada sign SIDDHAM in Unicode
11.0	U+0C84	1		L2/16-004		Moore, Lisa (2016-02-01), "D.2.2", UTC #146 Minutes
14.0	U+0CDD	1		L2/20-228R		A, Srinidhi; A, Sridatta (2021-01-07), Proposal to encode Kannada sign Nakaara Pollu
14.0	U+0CDD	1		L2/21-016R		Anderson, Deborah; Whistler, Ken; Pournader, Roozbeh; Moore, Lisa; Liang, Hai (2021-01-14), "12 Kannada", Recommendations to UTC #166 January 2021 on Script Proposals
14.0	U+0CDD	1		L2/21-009		Moore, Lisa (2021-01-27), "Consensus 166-C28", UTC #166 Minutes
15.0	U+0CF3	1		L2/20-260		Basty, Shashank Shenoy (2020-08-24), Preliminary Proposal to Encode Kannada Sign Combining Anusvara Right Top
15.0	U+0CF3	1		L2/20-250		Anderson, Deborah; Whistler, Ken; Pournader, Roozbeh; Moore, Lisa; Constable, Peter; Liang, Hai (2020-10-01), "11. Kannada", Recommendations to UTC #165 October 2020 on Script Proposals
15.0	U+0CF3	1		L2/21-114		Basty, Shashank Shenoy (2021-05-10), Proposal to Encode Kannada Sign Combining Anusvara Above Right
15.0	U+0CF3	1		L2/21-130		Anderson, Deborah; Whistler, Ken; Pournader, Roozbeh; Liang, Hai (2021-07-26), "9. Kannada", Recommendations to UTC #168 July 2021 on Script Proposals
15.0	U+0CF3	1		L2/21-123		Cummings, Craig (2021-08-03), "Consensus 168-C24", Draft Minutes of UTC Meeting 168
17.0	U+0CDC	1		L2/22-006		A, Srinidhi; A, Sridatta (2021-12-23), Proposal to encode ARCHAIC SHRII in Kannada and Telugu
17.0	U+0CDC	1		L2/22-023		Anderson, Deborah; Whistler, Ken; Pournader, Roozbeh; Constable, Peter (2022-01-22), "9 Kannada and Telugu", Recommendations to UTC #170 January 2022 on Script Proposals
17.0	U+0CDC	1		L2/22-016		Constable, Peter (2022-04-21), "D.1 9 Kannada and Telugu", UTC #170 Minutes
17.0	U+0CDC	1		L2/24-061		Constable, Peter (2024-04-29), "B.1.1", UTC #179 Minutes
