= Oriya (Unicode block) =

- Range: U+0B00..U+0B7F (128 code points)
- Plane: BMP
- Scripts: Oriya
- Major alphabets: Oriya; Khondi; Santali
- Assigned: 93 code points
- Unused: 35 reserved code points
- Source standards: ISCII

Unicode Version History
- 1.0.0 (1991): 78 (+78)
- 1.1 (1993): 79 (+1)
- 4.0 (2003): 81 (+2)
- 5.1 (2008): 84 (+3)
- 6.0 (2010): 90 (+6)
- 13.0 (2020): 91 (+1)
- 18.0 (2026): 93 (+2)

Unicode documentation
- Code chart ∣ Web page

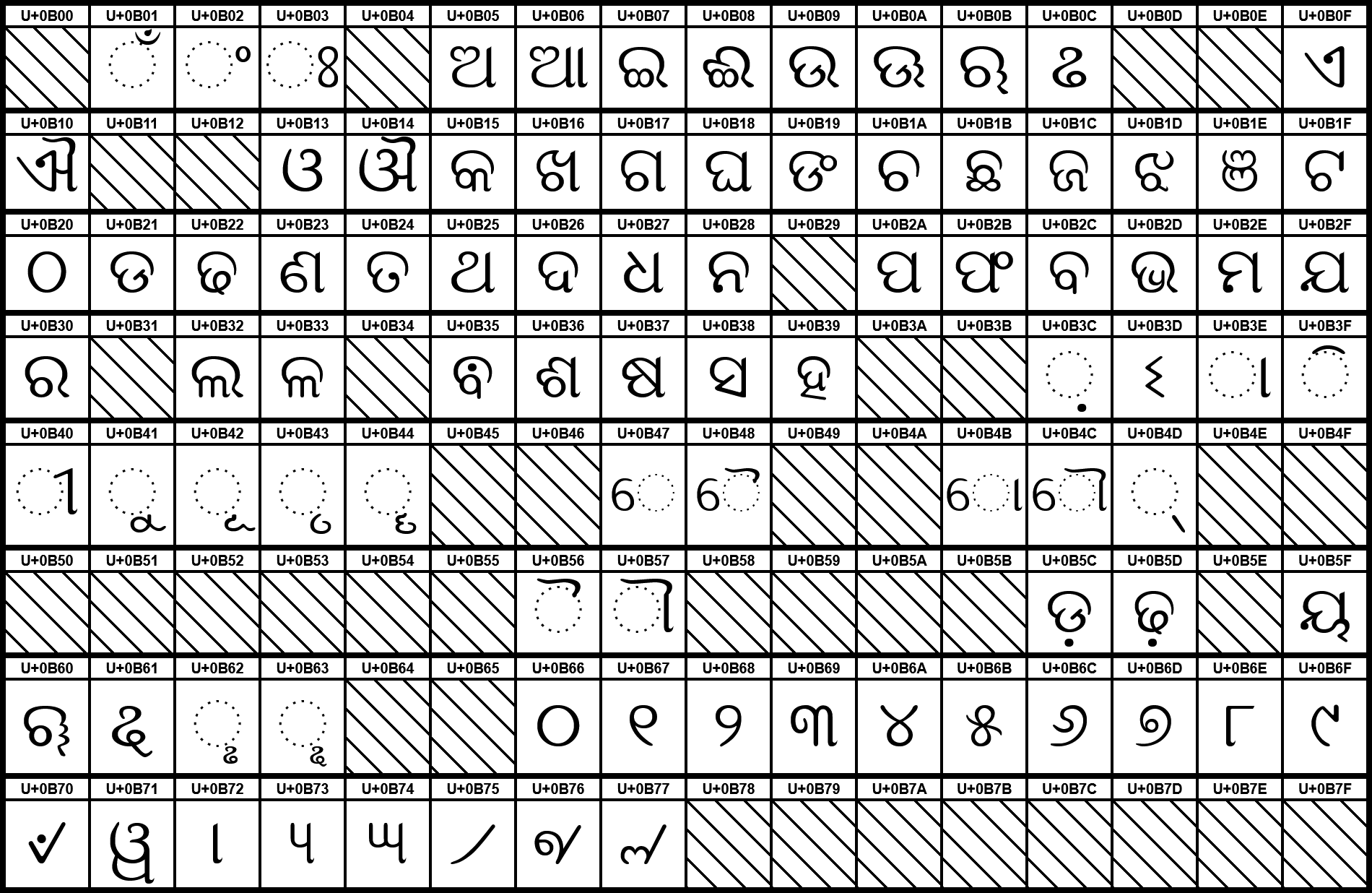
Graphical representation of the Oriya Unicode block

Oriya is a Unicode block containing characters for the Odia, Khondi and Santali languages of the state of Odisha in India. In its original incarnation, the code points U+0B01..U+0B4D were a direct copy of the Odia characters A1-ED from the 1988 ISCII standard. The Devanagari, Bengali, Gurmukhi, Gujarati, Tamil, Telugu, Kannada, and Malayalam blocks were similarly all based on their ISCII encodings.

Odia script combines symbols into hundreds of consonant ligatures.

== Block ==
Oriya^{[1]}^{[2]} Official Unicode Consortium code chart (PDF)
	0	1	2	3	4	5	6	7	8	9	A	B	C	D	E	F
U+0B0x		ଁ	ଂ	ଃ		ଅ	ଆ	ଇ	ଈ	ଉ	ଊ	ଋ	ଌ			ଏ
U+0B1x	ଐ			ଓ	ଔ	କ	ଖ	ଗ	ଘ	ଙ	ଚ	ଛ	ଜ	ଝ	ଞ	ଟ
U+0B2x	ଠ	ଡ	ଢ	ଣ	ତ	ଥ	ଦ	ଧ	ନ		ପ	ଫ	ବ	ଭ	ମ	ଯ
U+0B3x	ର		ଲ	ଳ		ଵ	ଶ	ଷ	ସ	ହ			଼	ଽ	ା	ି
U+0B4x	ୀ	ୁ	ୂ	ୃ	ୄ			େ	ୈ			ୋ	ୌ	୍		
U+0B5x				୓	୔	୕	ୖ	ୗ					ଡ଼	ଢ଼		ୟ
U+0B6x	ୠ	ୡ	ୢ	ୣ			୦	୧	୨	୩	୪	୫	୬	୭	୮	୯
U+0B7x	୰	ୱ	୲	୳	୴	୵	୶	୷								
Notes 1.As of Unicode version 18.0 2.Grey areas indicate non-assigned code points

== History ==
The following Unicode-related documents record the purpose and process of defining specific characters in the Oriya block:

Version	Final code points (Note: Proposed code points and characters names may differ from final code points and names)	Count	UTC ID	L2 ID	WG2 ID	Document
1.0.0	U+0B01..0B03, 0B05..0B0C, 0B0F..0B10, 0B13..0B28, 0B2A..0B30, 0B32..0B33, 0B36..0B39, 0B3C..0B43, 0B47..0B48, 0B4B..0B4D, 0B57, 0B5C..0B5D, 0B5F..0B61, 0B66..0B70	78	UTC/1991-056			Whistler, Ken, Indic Charts: Devanagari, Bengali, Gurmukhi, Gujarati, Oriya, Tamil, Telugu, Kannada, Malayalam
1.0.0	U+0B01..0B03, 0B05..0B0C, 0B0F..0B10, 0B13..0B28, 0B2A..0B30, 0B32..0B33, 0B36..0B39, 0B3C..0B43, 0B47..0B48, 0B4B..0B4D, 0B57, 0B5C..0B5D, 0B5F..0B61, 0B66..0B70	78	UTC/1991-057			Whistler, Ken, Indic names list
1.0.0	U+0B01..0B03, 0B05..0B0C, 0B0F..0B10, 0B13..0B28, 0B2A..0B30, 0B32..0B33, 0B36..0B39, 0B3C..0B43, 0B47..0B48, 0B4B..0B4D, 0B57, 0B5C..0B5D, 0B5F..0B61, 0B66..0B70	78	UTC/1991-048B			Whistler, Ken (1991-03-27), "III. L. Walk In proposals", Draft Minutes from the UTC meeting #46 day 2, 3/27 at Apple
1.0.0	U+0B01..0B03, 0B05..0B0C, 0B0F..0B10, 0B13..0B28, 0B2A..0B30, 0B32..0B33, 0B36..0B39, 0B3C..0B43, 0B47..0B48, 0B4B..0B4D, 0B57, 0B5C..0B5D, 0B5F..0B61, 0B66..0B70	78		L2/01-303		Vikas, Om (2001-07-26), Letter from the Government from India on "Draft for Unicode Standard for Indian Scripts"
1.0.0	U+0B01..0B03, 0B05..0B0C, 0B0F..0B10, 0B13..0B28, 0B2A..0B30, 0B32..0B33, 0B36..0B39, 0B3C..0B43, 0B47..0B48, 0B4B..0B4D, 0B57, 0B5C..0B5D, 0B5F..0B61, 0B66..0B70	78		L2/01-304		Feedback on Unicode Standard 3.0, 2001-08-02
1.0.0	U+0B01..0B03, 0B05..0B0C, 0B0F..0B10, 0B13..0B28, 0B2A..0B30, 0B32..0B33, 0B36..0B39, 0B3C..0B43, 0B47..0B48, 0B4B..0B4D, 0B57, 0B5C..0B5D, 0B5F..0B61, 0B66..0B70	78		L2/01-305		McGowan, Rick (2001-08-08), Draft UTC Response to L2/01-304, "Feedback on Unicode Standard 3.0"
1.0.0	U+0B01..0B03, 0B05..0B0C, 0B0F..0B10, 0B13..0B28, 0B2A..0B30, 0B32..0B33, 0B36..0B39, 0B3C..0B43, 0B47..0B48, 0B4B..0B4D, 0B57, 0B5C..0B5D, 0B5F..0B61, 0B66..0B70	78		L2/01-430R		McGowan, Rick (2001-11-20), UTC Response to L2/01-304, "Feedback on Unicode Standard 3.0"
1.0.0	U+0B01..0B03, 0B05..0B0C, 0B0F..0B10, 0B13..0B28, 0B2A..0B30, 0B32..0B33, 0B36..0B39, 0B3C..0B43, 0B47..0B48, 0B4B..0B4D, 0B57, 0B5C..0B5D, 0B5F..0B61, 0B66..0B70	78		L2/20-055		Pournader, Roozbeh (2020-01-16), Proposed sequences for composition exclusions
1.0.0	U+0B01..0B03, 0B05..0B0C, 0B0F..0B10, 0B13..0B28, 0B2A..0B30, 0B32..0B33, 0B36..0B39, 0B3C..0B43, 0B47..0B48, 0B4B..0B4D, 0B57, 0B5C..0B5D, 0B5F..0B61, 0B66..0B70	78		L2/20-015R		Moore, Lisa (2020-05-14), "B.13.1.1 Proposed sequences for composition exclusions", Draft Minutes of UTC Meeting 162
1.1	U+0B56	1				(to be determined)
4.0	U+0B35, 0B71	2		L2/01-431R (Note: See also L2/01-303, L2/01-304, L2/01-305, and L2/01-430R)		McGowan, Rick (2001-11-08), Actions for UTC and Editorial Committee in response to L2/01-430R
4.0	U+0B35, 0B71	2		L2/01-405R		Moore, Lisa (2001-12-12), "Consensus 89-C19", Minutes from the UTC/L2 meeting in Mountain View, November 6-9, 2001, "Accept the twelve Indic characters with names and coding positions as documented in L2/01-431R"
4.0	U+0B35, 0B71	2		L2/02-117	N2425	McGowan, Rick (2002-03-21), Additional Characters for Indic Scripts
4.0	U+0B35, 0B71	2		L2/02-425		Everson, Michael; Stone, Anthony (2002-11-20), On Oriya VA and WA
4.0	U+0B35, 0B71	2			N2525	Everson, Michael; Stone, Anthony (2002-11-21), On Oriya VA and WA, and a proposal to encode one Oriya letter in the UCS
4.0	U+0B35, 0B71	2		L2/03-102		Vikas, Om (2003-03-04), Unicode Standard for Indic Scripts
4.0	U+0B35, 0B71	2		L2/03-101.7		Proposed Changes in Indic Scripts [Oriya document], 2003-03-04
5.1	U+0B44, 0B62..0B63	3		L2/03-102		Vikas, Om (2003-03-04), Unicode Standard for Indic Scripts
5.1	U+0B44, 0B62..0B63	3		L2/03-101.7		Proposed Changes in Indic Scripts [Oriya document], 2003-03-04
5.1	U+0B44, 0B62..0B63	3		L2/05-063		Vikas, Om (2005-02-07), "Awaiting Updates-Bengali & Oriya", Issues in Representation of Indic Scripts in Unicode
5.1	U+0B44, 0B62..0B63	3		L2/05-070		McGowan, Rick (2005-02-09), Indic ad hoc report
5.1	U+0B44, 0B62..0B63	3		L2/05-026		Moore, Lisa (2005-05-16), "Scripts - Indic (C.12)", UTC #102 Minutes
5.1	U+0B44, 0B62..0B63	3		L2/07-095R	N3235R	Everson, Michael; Scharf, Peter; Angot, Michel; Chandrashekar, R.; Hyman, Malcolm; Rosenfield, Susan; Sastry, B. V. Venkatakrishna; Witzel, Michael (2007-04-13), Proposal to encode characters for Vedic Sanskrit in the BMP of the UCS
5.1	U+0B44, 0B62..0B63	3		L2/07-118R2		Moore, Lisa (2007-05-23), "111-C17", UTC #111 Minutes
5.1	U+0B44, 0B62..0B63	3		L2/07-196	N3272	Everson, Michael (2007-05-25), Proposal to encode four characters for Oriya and Malayalam
5.1	U+0B44, 0B62..0B63	3		L2/07-268	N3253 (pdf, doc)	Umamaheswaran, V. S. (2007-07-26), "M50.23", Unconfirmed minutes of WG 2 meeting 50, Frankfurt-am-Main, Germany; 2007-04-24/27
6.0	U+0B72..0B77	6		L2/07-413		Pandey, Anshuman (2007-12-04), Proposal to Encode Oriya Fraction Signs
6.0	U+0B72..0B77	6		L2/08-199	N3471	Pandey, Anshuman (2008-05-05), Proposal to Encode Oriya Fraction Signs in ISO/IEC 10646
6.0	U+0B72..0B77	6		L2/08-199R		Pandey, Anshuman (2008-05-05), Proposal to Encode Oriya Fraction Signs in ISO/IEC 10646
6.0	U+0B72..0B77	6		L2/08-161R2		Moore, Lisa (2008-11-05), "Oriya Fraction Signs", UTC #115 Minutes
6.0	U+0B72..0B77	6		L2/08-412	N3553 (pdf, doc)	Umamaheswaran, V. S. (2008-11-05), "M53.24d", Unconfirmed minutes of WG 2 meeting 53
13.0	U+0B55	1		L2/19-005R2	N5023	Evans, Lorna (2019-01-01), Proposal to encode ORIYA SIGN OVERLINE
13.0	U+0B55	1		L2/19-047		Anderson, Deborah; et al. (2019-01-13), "11. Oriya", Recommendations to UTC #158 January 2019 on Script Proposals
13.0	U+0B55	1		L2/19-008		Moore, Lisa (2019-02-08), "D.4", UTC #158 Minutes
13.0	U+0B55	1		L2/19-286		Anderson, Deborah; Whistler, Ken; Pournader, Roozbeh; Moore, Lisa; Liang, Hai (2019-07-22), "9. Oriya", Recommendations to UTC #160 July 2019 on Script Proposals
13.0	U+0B55	1		L2/19-270		Moore, Lisa (2019-10-07), "D.9", UTC #160 Minutes
18.0	U+0B53..0B54	2		L2/24-106R		Evans, Lorna Priest (2024-04-25), Request to encode DOT ABOVE characters for the ORIYA/ODIA script
18.0	U+0B53..0B54	2		L2/24-068		Anderson, Deborah; Goregaokar, Manish; Kučera, Jan; Whistler, Ken; Pournader, Roozbeh; Constable, Peter (2024-04-18), "8. Oriya", Recommendations to UTC #179 April 2024 on Script Proposals
18.0	U+0B53..0B54	2		L2/24-061		Constable, Peter (2024-04-29), "Consensus 179-C54", UTC #179 Minutes, "Provisionally assign 2 Oriya code points ..."
18.0	U+0B53..0B54	2		L2/24-221		Constable, Peter (2024-11-12), "Consensus 181-C60", UTC #181 Minutes, "UTC accepts for encoding in Unicode Version 17.0 the following ..."
18.0	U+0B53..0B54	2		L2/25-181		Leroy, Robin (2025-08-07), "Consensus 184-C2", UTC #184 Minutes, "... removed from Unicode 17.0 and ... targeted instead for Unicode 18.0"
