= Gurmukhi (Unicode block) =

- Range: U+0A00..U+0A7F (128 code points)
- Plane: BMP
- Scripts: Gurmukhi
- Major alphabets: Punjabi
- Assigned: 80 code points
- Unused: 48 reserved code points
- Source standards: ISCII

Unicode version history
- 1.0.0 (1991): 74 (+74)
- 1.1 (1993): 75 (+1)
- 4.0 (2003): 77 (+2)
- 5.1 (2008): 79 (+2)
- 11.0 (2018): 80 (+1)

Unicode documentation
- Code chart ∣ Web page

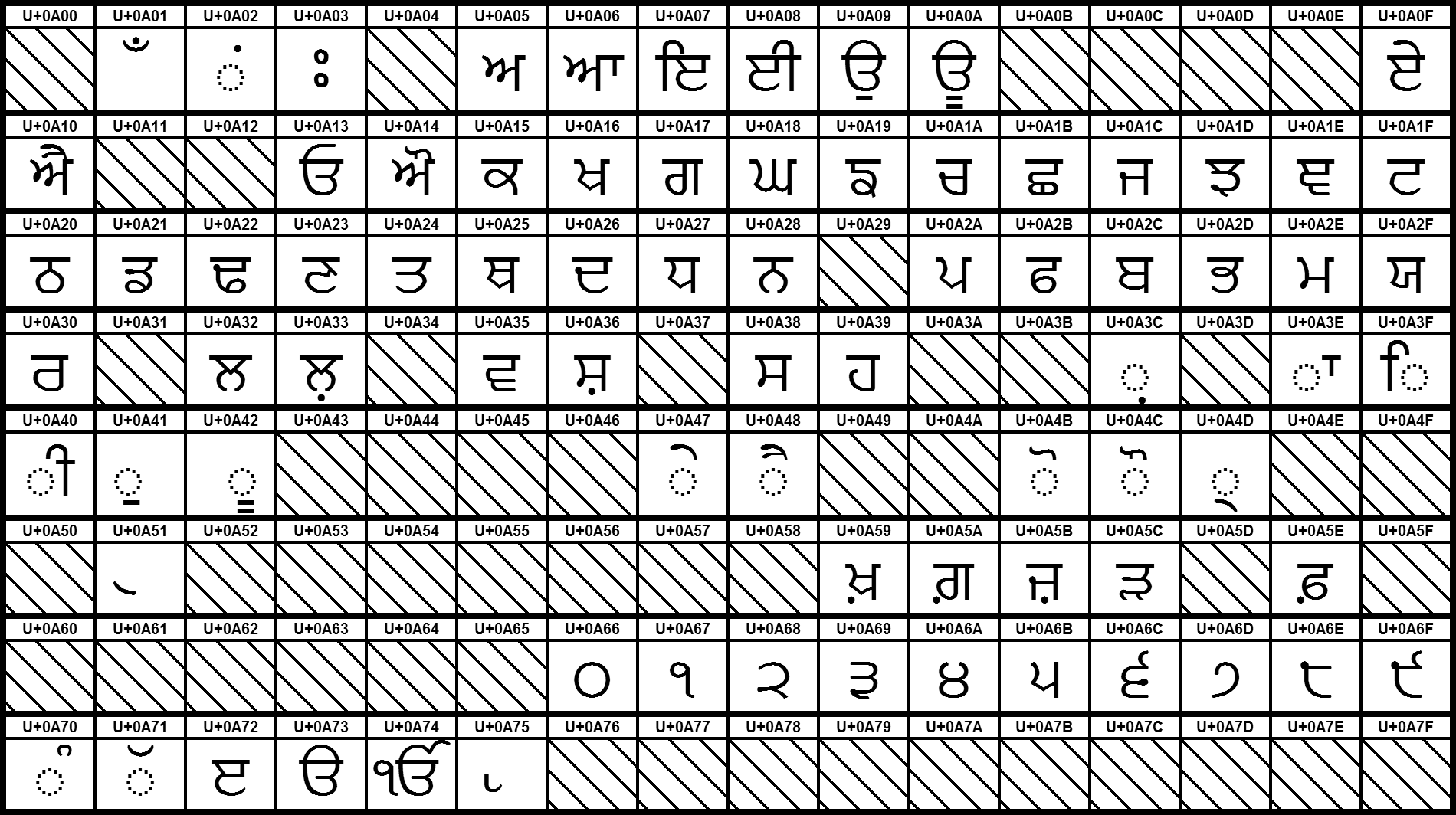
Graphical representation of the Gurmukhi Unicode block

Gurmukhi is a Unicode block containing characters for the Punjabi language, in the Gurmukhi script. In its original incarnation, the code points U+0A02..U+0A4C were a direct copy of the Gurmukhi characters A2-EC from the 1988 ISCII standard. The Devanagari, Bengali, Gujarati, Oriya, Tamil, Telugu, Kannada, and Malayalam blocks were similarly all based on their ISCII encodings.

== Block ==
Gurmukhi^{[1]}^{[2]} Official Unicode Consortium code chart (PDF)
	0	1	2	3	4	5	6	7	8	9	A	B	C	D	E	F
U+0A0x		ਁ	ਂ	ਃ		ਅ	ਆ	ਇ	ਈ	ਉ	ਊ					ਏ
U+0A1x	ਐ			ਓ	ਔ	ਕ	ਖ	ਗ	ਘ	ਙ	ਚ	ਛ	ਜ	ਝ	ਞ	ਟ
U+0A2x	ਠ	ਡ	ਢ	ਣ	ਤ	ਥ	ਦ	ਧ	ਨ		ਪ	ਫ	ਬ	ਭ	ਮ	ਯ
U+0A3x	ਰ		ਲ	ਲ਼		ਵ	ਸ਼		ਸ	ਹ			਼		ਾ	ਿ
U+0A4x	ੀ	ੁ	ੂ					ੇ	ੈ			ੋ	ੌ	੍		
U+0A5x		ੑ								ਖ਼	ਗ਼	ਜ਼	ੜ		ਫ਼	
U+0A6x							੦	੧	੨	੩	੪	੫	੬	੭	੮	੯
U+0A7x	ੰ	ੱ	ੲ	ੳ	ੴ	ੵ	੶									
Notes: 1. As of Unicode version 16.0; 2. Grey areas indicate non-assigned code points

== History ==
The following Unicode-related documents record the purpose and process of defining specific characters in the Gurmukhi block:

Version	Final code points (Note: Proposed code points and characters names may differ from final code points and names)	Count	UTC ID	L2 ID	WG2 ID	Document
1.0.0	U+0A02, 0A05..0A0A, 0A0F..0A10, 0A13..0A28, 0A2A..0A30, 0A32..0A33, 0A35..0A36, 0A38..0A39, 0A3C, 0A3E..0A42, 0A47..0A48, 0A4B..0A4C, 0A59..0A5C, 0A5E, 0A66..0A74	74	UTC/1991-056			Whistler, Ken, Indic Charts: Devanagari, Bengali, Gurmukhi, Gujarati, Oriya, Tamil, Telugu, Kannada, Malayalam
1.0.0	U+0A02, 0A05..0A0A, 0A0F..0A10, 0A13..0A28, 0A2A..0A30, 0A32..0A33, 0A35..0A36, 0A38..0A39, 0A3C, 0A3E..0A42, 0A47..0A48, 0A4B..0A4C, 0A59..0A5C, 0A5E, 0A66..0A74	74	UTC/1991-057			Whistler, Ken, Indic names list
1.0.0	U+0A02, 0A05..0A0A, 0A0F..0A10, 0A13..0A28, 0A2A..0A30, 0A32..0A33, 0A35..0A36, 0A38..0A39, 0A3C, 0A3E..0A42, 0A47..0A48, 0A4B..0A4C, 0A59..0A5C, 0A5E, 0A66..0A74	74	UTC/1991-048B			Whistler, Ken (1991-03-27), "III. L. Walk In proposals", Draft Minutes from the UTC meeting #46 day 2, 3/27 at Apple
1.0.0	U+0A02, 0A05..0A0A, 0A0F..0A10, 0A13..0A28, 0A2A..0A30, 0A32..0A33, 0A35..0A36, 0A38..0A39, 0A3C, 0A3E..0A42, 0A47..0A48, 0A4B..0A4C, 0A59..0A5C, 0A5E, 0A66..0A74	74		L2/01-303		Vikas, Om (2001-07-26), Letter from the Government from India on "Draft for Unicode Standard for Indian Scripts"
1.0.0	U+0A02, 0A05..0A0A, 0A0F..0A10, 0A13..0A28, 0A2A..0A30, 0A32..0A33, 0A35..0A36, 0A38..0A39, 0A3C, 0A3E..0A42, 0A47..0A48, 0A4B..0A4C, 0A59..0A5C, 0A5E, 0A66..0A74	74		L2/01-304		Feedback on Unicode Standard 3.0, 2001-08-02
1.0.0	U+0A02, 0A05..0A0A, 0A0F..0A10, 0A13..0A28, 0A2A..0A30, 0A32..0A33, 0A35..0A36, 0A38..0A39, 0A3C, 0A3E..0A42, 0A47..0A48, 0A4B..0A4C, 0A59..0A5C, 0A5E, 0A66..0A74	74		L2/01-305		McGowan, Rick (2001-08-08), Draft UTC Response to L2/01-304, "Feedback on Unicode Standard 3.0"
1.0.0	U+0A02, 0A05..0A0A, 0A0F..0A10, 0A13..0A28, 0A2A..0A30, 0A32..0A33, 0A35..0A36, 0A38..0A39, 0A3C, 0A3E..0A42, 0A47..0A48, 0A4B..0A4C, 0A59..0A5C, 0A5E, 0A66..0A74	74		L2/01-430R		McGowan, Rick (2001-11-20), UTC Response to L2/01-304, "Feedback on Unicode Standard 3.0"
1.0.0	U+0A02, 0A05..0A0A, 0A0F..0A10, 0A13..0A28, 0A2A..0A30, 0A32..0A33, 0A35..0A36, 0A38..0A39, 0A3C, 0A3E..0A42, 0A47..0A48, 0A4B..0A4C, 0A59..0A5C, 0A5E, 0A66..0A74	74		L2/05-371R		Sidhu, Sukhjinder (2005-11-30), Gurmukhi annotations
1.0.0	U+0A02, 0A05..0A0A, 0A0F..0A10, 0A13..0A28, 0A2A..0A30, 0A32..0A33, 0A35..0A36, 0A38..0A39, 0A3C, 0A3E..0A42, 0A47..0A48, 0A4B..0A4C, 0A59..0A5C, 0A5E, 0A66..0A74	74		L2/06-008R2		Moore, Lisa (2006-02-13), "C.8", UTC #106 Minutes
1.0.0	U+0A02, 0A05..0A0A, 0A0F..0A10, 0A13..0A28, 0A2A..0A30, 0A32..0A33, 0A35..0A36, 0A38..0A39, 0A3C, 0A3E..0A42, 0A47..0A48, 0A4B..0A4C, 0A59..0A5C, 0A5E, 0A66..0A74	74		L2/20-055		Pournader, Roozbeh (2020-01-16), Proposed sequences for composition exclusions
1.0.0	U+0A02, 0A05..0A0A, 0A0F..0A10, 0A13..0A28, 0A2A..0A30, 0A32..0A33, 0A35..0A36, 0A38..0A39, 0A3C, 0A3E..0A42, 0A47..0A48, 0A4B..0A4C, 0A59..0A5C, 0A5E, 0A66..0A74	74		L2/20-015R		Moore, Lisa (2020-05-14), "B.13.1.1 Proposed sequences for composition exclusions", Draft Minutes of UTC Meeting 162
1.1	U+0A4D	1				(to be determined)
4.0	U+0A01, 0A03	2		L2/01-431R (Note: See also L2/01-303, L2/01-304, L2/01-305, and L2/01-430R)		McGowan, Rick (2001-11-08), Actions for UTC and Editorial Committee in response to L2/01-430R
4.0	U+0A01, 0A03	2		L2/01-405R		Moore, Lisa (2001-12-12), "Consensus 89-C19", Minutes from the UTC/L2 meeting in Mountain View, November 6-9, 2001, "Accept the twelve Indic characters with names and coding positions as documented in L2/01-431R"
4.0	U+0A01, 0A03	2		L2/02-117	N2425	McGowan, Rick (2002-03-21), Additional Characters for Indic Scripts
4.0	U+0A01, 0A03	2		L2/03-102		Vikas, Om (2003-03-04), Unicode Standard for Indic Scripts
4.0	U+0A01, 0A03	2		L2/03-101.4		Proposed Changes in Indic Scripts [Gurmukhi document], 2003-03-04
5.1	U+0A51	1		L2/05-088R		Sidhu, Sukhjinder (2005-04-21), Proposed Changes to Gurmukhi
5.1	U+0A51	1		L2/05-167		Sidhu, Sukhjinder (2005-08-01), Proposed Changes to Gurmukhi 2
5.1	U+0A51	1		L2/05-180		Moore, Lisa (2005-08-17), "Gurmukhi (C.6)", UTC #104 Minutes
5.1	U+0A51	1		L2/05-344		Sidhu, Sukhjinder (2005-10-27), Proposed changes to Gurmukhi 3
5.1	U+0A51	1		L2/05-279		Moore, Lisa (2005-11-10), "C.14", UTC #105 Minutes
5.1	U+0A51	1		L2/05-384	N3021	Sidhu, Sukhjinder (2005-12-18), Proposal to encode Gurmukhi 3
5.1	U+0A51	1		L2/06-020		McGowan, Rick (2006-01-25), Public Review Issue #82: Representation of Gurmukhi Double Vowels
5.1	U+0A51	1		L2/06-030		Sidhu, Sukhjinder (2006-01-27), "E", Proposed Changes to Gurmukhi 4
5.1	U+0A51	1		L2/06-008R2		Moore, Lisa (2006-02-13), "B.11.5, C.8", UTC #106 Minutes
5.1	U+0A51	1			N3103 (pdf, doc)	Umamaheswaran, V. S. (2006-08-25), "M48.25a", Unconfirmed minutes of WG 2 meeting 48, Mountain View, CA, USA; 2006-04-24/27
5.1	U+0A75	1		L2/06-008R2		Moore, Lisa (2006-02-13), "C.8", UTC #106 Minutes
5.1	U+0A75	1		L2/06-037R	N3073	Sidhu, Sukhjinder (2006-04-07), Proposal to encode Gurmukhi Sign Yakash
5.1	U+0A75	1			N3103 (pdf, doc)	Umamaheswaran, V. S. (2006-08-25), "M48.25b", Unconfirmed minutes of WG 2 meeting 48, Mountain View, CA, USA; 2006-04-24/27
5.1	U+0A75	1		L2/16-294		Singh, Sarabveer (2016-10-27), Changes to Gurmukhi 10
5.1	U+0A75	1		L2/16-302		Sharma, Shriramana (2016-10-28), Feedback on L2/16-294 on Gurmukhi
5.1	U+0A75	1		L2/16-327		McGowan, Rick (2016-11-07), "Feedback on L2/16-294 (Gurmukhi)", Comments on Public Review Issues (July 27 - Nov 7, 2016)
5.1	U+0A75	1		L2/16-342		Anderson, Deborah; Whistler, Ken; Pournader, Roozbeh; Glass, Andrew; Iancu, Laurențiu (2016-11-07), "4", Recommendations to UTC #149 November 2016 on Script Proposals
5.1	U+0A75	1		L2/16-325		Moore, Lisa (2016-11-18), "D.4 (later rescinded)", UTC #149 Minutes
5.1	U+0A75	1		L2/16-380		Singh, Manvir (2016-12-09), Feedback on L2/16-294
5.1	U+0A75	1		L2/16-384		Singh, Sarabveer (2016-12-13), Feedback on L2/16-380
5.1	U+0A75	1		L2/17-037		Anderson, Deborah; Whistler, Ken; Pournader, Roozbeh; Glass, Andrew; Iancu, Laurențiu; Moore, Lisa; Liang, Hai; Ishida, Richard; Misra, Karan; McGowan, Rick (2017-01-21), "5. Gurmukhi", Recommendations to UTC #150 January 2017 on Script Proposals
5.1	U+0A75	1		L2/17-016		Moore, Lisa (2017-02-08), "Consensus 150-C13", UTC #150 Minutes, "Retain the current glyph in the code charts for Yakash, U+0A75, rescinding the decision documented under D.4.1 in the UTC #149 minutes."
11.0	U+0A76	1		L2/16-209R		A, Srinidhi; A, Sridatta (2016-07-25), Proposal to Encode an Abbreviation Sign for Gurmukhi
11.0	U+0A76	1		L2/16-203		Moore, Lisa (2016-08-18), "D.9", UTC #148 Minutes
11.0	U+0A76	1			N4873R (pdf, doc)	"M65.08f", Unconfirmed minutes of WG 2 meeting 65, 2018-03-16
