= Tamil (Unicode block) =

- Range: U+0B80..U+0BFF (128 code points)
- Plane: BMP
- Scripts: Tamil
- Major alphabets: Tamil; Saurashtra
- Assigned: 72 code points
- Unused: 56 reserved code points
- Source standards: ISCII

Unicode version history
- 1.0.0 (1991): 61 (+61)
- 4.0 (2003): 69 (+8)
- 4.1 (2005): 71 (+2)
- 5.1 (2008): 72 (+1)

Unicode documentation
- Code chart ∣ Web page

Tamil is a Unicode block containing characters for the Tamil, and Saurashtra languages of Tamil Nadu India, Sri Lanka, Singapore, and Malaysia. In its original incarnation, the code points U+0B82..U+0BCD were a direct copy of the Tamil characters A2-ED from the 1988 ISCII standard. The Devanagari, Bengali, Gurmukhi, Gujarati, Oriya, Telugu, Kannada, and Malayalam blocks were similarly all based on their ISCII encodings.

== Block ==
Tamil^{[1]}^{[2]} Official Unicode Consortium code chart (PDF)
| | 0 | 1 | 2 | 3 | 4 | 5 | 6 | 7 | 8 | 9 | A | B | C | D | E | F |
| U+0B8x | | | ஂ | ஃ | | அ | ஆ | இ | ஈ | உ | ஊ | | | | எ | ஏ |
| U+0B9x | ஐ | | ஒ | ஓ | ஔ | க | | | | ங | ச | | ஜ | | ஞ | ட |
| U+0BAx | | | | ண | த | | | | ந | ன | ப | | | | ம | ய |
| U+0BBx | ர | ற | ல | ள | ழ | வ | ஶ | ஷ | ஸ | ஹ | | | | | ா | ி |
| U+0BCx | ீ | ு | ூ | | | | ெ | ே | ை | | ொ | ோ | ௌ | ் | | |
| U+0BDx | ௐ | | | | | | | ௗ | | | | | | | | |
| U+0BEx | | | | | | | ௦ | ௧ | ௨ | ௩ | ௪ | ௫ | ௬ | ௭ | ௮ | ௯ |
| U+0BFx | ௰ | ௱ | ௲ | ௳ | ௴ | ௵ | ௶ | ௷ | ௸ | ௹ | ௺ | | | | | |
Notes: 1. As of Unicode version 16.0; 2. Grey areas indicate non-assigned code points

== History ==
The following Unicode-related documents record the purpose and process of defining specific characters in the Tamil block:

| Version | Final code points (Note: Proposed code points and characters names may differ from final code points and names) | Count | UTC ID | L2 ID | WG2 ID | Document |
|---|---|---|---|---|---|---|
| 1.0.0 | U+0B82..0B83, 0B85..0B8A, 0B8E..0B90, 0B92..0B95, 0B99..0B9A, 0B9C, 0B9E..0B9F, 0BA3..0BA4, 0BA8..0BAA, 0BAE..0BB5, 0BB7..0BB9, 0BBE..0BC2, 0BC6..0BC8, 0BCA..0BCD, 0BD7, 0BE7..0BF2 | 61 | UTC/1991-056 | | | Whistler, Ken, Indic Charts: Devanagari, Bengali, Gurmukhi, Gujarati, Oriya, Tamil, Telugu, Kannada, Malayalam |
| 1.0.0 | U+0B82..0B83, 0B85..0B8A, 0B8E..0B90, 0B92..0B95, 0B99..0B9A, 0B9C, 0B9E..0B9F, 0BA3..0BA4, 0BA8..0BAA, 0BAE..0BB5, 0BB7..0BB9, 0BBE..0BC2, 0BC6..0BC8, 0BCA..0BCD, 0BD7, 0BE7..0BF2 | 61 | UTC/1991-057 | | | Whistler, Ken, Indic names list |
| 1.0.0 | U+0B82..0B83, 0B85..0B8A, 0B8E..0B90, 0B92..0B95, 0B99..0B9A, 0B9C, 0B9E..0B9F, 0BA3..0BA4, 0BA8..0BAA, 0BAE..0BB5, 0BB7..0BB9, 0BBE..0BC2, 0BC6..0BC8, 0BCA..0BCD, 0BD7, 0BE7..0BF2 | 61 | UTC/1991-048B | | | Whistler, Ken (1991-03-27), "III. L. Walk In proposals", Draft Minutes from the UTC meeting #46 day 2, 3/27 at Apple |
| 1.0.0 | U+0B82..0B83, 0B85..0B8A, 0B8E..0B90, 0B92..0B95, 0B99..0B9A, 0B9C, 0B9E..0B9F, 0BA3..0BA4, 0BA8..0BAA, 0BAE..0BB5, 0BB7..0BB9, 0BBE..0BC2, 0BC6..0BC8, 0BCA..0BCD, 0BD7, 0BE7..0BF2 | 61 | | L2/01-303 | | Vikas, Om (2001-07-26), Letter from the Government from India on "Draft for Unicode Standard for Indian Scripts" |
| 1.0.0 | U+0B82..0B83, 0B85..0B8A, 0B8E..0B90, 0B92..0B95, 0B99..0B9A, 0B9C, 0B9E..0B9F, 0BA3..0BA4, 0BA8..0BAA, 0BAE..0BB5, 0BB7..0BB9, 0BBE..0BC2, 0BC6..0BC8, 0BCA..0BCD, 0BD7, 0BE7..0BF2 | 61 | | L2/01-304 | | Feedback on Unicode Standard 3.0, 2001-08-02 |
| 1.0.0 | U+0B82..0B83, 0B85..0B8A, 0B8E..0B90, 0B92..0B95, 0B99..0B9A, 0B9C, 0B9E..0B9F, 0BA3..0BA4, 0BA8..0BAA, 0BAE..0BB5, 0BB7..0BB9, 0BBE..0BC2, 0BC6..0BC8, 0BCA..0BCD, 0BD7, 0BE7..0BF2 | 61 | | L2/01-305 | | McGowan, Rick (2001-08-08), Draft UTC Response to L2/01-304, "Feedback on Unicode Standard 3.0" |
| 1.0.0 | U+0B82..0B83, 0B85..0B8A, 0B8E..0B90, 0B92..0B95, 0B99..0B9A, 0B9C, 0B9E..0B9F, 0BA3..0BA4, 0BA8..0BAA, 0BAE..0BB5, 0BB7..0BB9, 0BBE..0BC2, 0BC6..0BC8, 0BCA..0BCD, 0BD7, 0BE7..0BF2 | 61 | | L2/01-295R | | Moore, Lisa (2001-11-06), "Motion 88-M9", Minutes from the UTC/L2 meeting #88, "The UTC approves changing the general category type of U+0B83 TAMIL SIGN VISARGA from Mn to Lo." |
| 1.0.0 | U+0B82..0B83, 0B85..0B8A, 0B8E..0B90, 0B92..0B95, 0B99..0B9A, 0B9C, 0B9E..0B9F, 0BA3..0BA4, 0BA8..0BAA, 0BAE..0BB5, 0BB7..0BB9, 0BBE..0BC2, 0BC6..0BC8, 0BCA..0BCD, 0BD7, 0BE7..0BF2 | 61 | | L2/01-430R | | McGowan, Rick (2001-11-20), UTC Response to L2/01-304, "Feedback on Unicode Standard 3.0" |
| 1.0.0 | U+0B82..0B83, 0B85..0B8A, 0B8E..0B90, 0B92..0B95, 0B99..0B9A, 0B9C, 0B9E..0B9F, 0BA3..0BA4, 0BA8..0BAA, 0BAE..0BB5, 0BB7..0BB9, 0BBE..0BC2, 0BC6..0BC8, 0BCA..0BCD, 0BD7, 0BE7..0BF2 | 61 | | L2/05-185 | | Documentation for KSSA as Non-conjunct Consonant and Conjunct Consonant in Tamil, 2005-07-25 |
| 1.0.0 | U+0B82..0B83, 0B85..0B8A, 0B8E..0B90, 0B92..0B95, 0B99..0B9A, 0B9C, 0B9E..0B9F, 0BA3..0BA4, 0BA8..0BAA, 0BAE..0BB5, 0BB7..0BB9, 0BBE..0BC2, 0BC6..0BC8, 0BCA..0BCD, 0BD7, 0BE7..0BF2 | 61 | | L2/05-180 | | Moore, Lisa (2005-08-17), "Tamil (C.12.1), KSSA in Tamil (C.12)", UTC #104 Minutes |
| 1.0.0 | U+0B82..0B83, 0B85..0B8A, 0B8E..0B90, 0B92..0B95, 0B99..0B9A, 0B9C, 0B9E..0B9F, 0BA3..0BA4, 0BA8..0BAA, 0BAE..0BB5, 0BB7..0BB9, 0BBE..0BC2, 0BC6..0BC8, 0BCA..0BCD, 0BD7, 0BE7..0BF2 | 61 | | L2/10-108 | | Moore, Lisa (2010-05-19), "B.10.15 [U+0B83, U+0BC1, U+0BC2]", UTC #123 / L2 #220 Minutes |
| 4.0 | U+0BF3..0BFA | 8 | | L2/01-375R | N2381R | Umamaheswaran, V. S. (2001-10-11), Proposal to add eight Tamil symbols |
| 4.0 | U+0BF3..0BFA | 8 | | L2/01-420 | | Whistler, Ken (2001-10-30), "d. Tamil sign additions", WG2 (Singapore) Resolution Consent Docket for UTC |
| 4.0 | U+0BF3..0BFA | 8 | | L2/01-405R | | Moore, Lisa (2001-12-12), "Consensus 89-C23", Minutes from the UTC/L2 meeting in Mountain View, November 6-9, 2001 |
| 4.0 | U+0BF3..0BFA | 8 | | L2/02-112 | N2421 | Umamaheswaran, V. S. (2002-03-15), Feedback on Tamil Symbols in PDAM2-10646-1 from the INFITT WG on Unicode |
| 4.0 | U+0BF3..0BFA | 8 | | L2/02-154 | N2403 | Umamaheswaran, V. S. (2002-04-22), "7.11", Draft minutes of WG 2 meeting 41, Hotel Phoenix, Singapore, 2001-10-15/19 |
| 4.0 | U+0BF3..0BFA | 8 | | L2/12-106 | | Sharma, Shriramana (2012-03-17), "2. Tamil", Request for editorial updates to various Indic scripts |
| 4.0 | U+0BF3..0BFA | 8 | | L2/12-147 | | Anderson, Deborah; McGowan, Rick; Whistler, Ken (2012-04-25), "II. TAMIL", Review of Indic-related L2 documents and Recommendations to the UTC |
| 4.0 | U+0BF3..0BFA | 8 | | L2/12-150 | | Ganesan, Naga (2012-05-01), Tamil credit sign (U+0BF7) glyph shape from Printed Books |
| 4.0 | U+0BF3..0BFA | 8 | | L2/12-180 | | Manivannan, Mani (2012-05-05), Review of Indic-related L2 documents and Recommendations |
| 4.0 | U+0BF3..0BFA | 8 | | L2/12-384 | | Ganesan, Naga (2012-06-11), Comments on Tamil fractions and Tamil credit sign |
| 4.0 | U+0BF3..0BFA | 8 | | L2/13-028 | | Anderson, Deborah; McGowan, Rick; Whistler, Ken; Pournader, Roozbeh (2013-01-28), "19.2", Recommendations to UTC on Script Proposals |
| 4.0 | U+0BF3..0BFA | 8 | | | N4480 | Sharma, Shriramana (2013-09-06), Request to change two glyphs of existing Tamil symbols |
| 4.0 | U+0BF3..0BFA | 8 | | L2/17-424 | | A, Srinidhi; A, Sridatta (2017-12-08), Changes to ScriptExtensions.txt for Indic characters for Unicode 11.0 |
| 4.0 | U+0BF3..0BFA | 8 | | L2/18-039 | | Anderson, Deborah; Whistler, Ken; Pournader, Roozbeh; Moore, Lisa; Liang, Hai; Cook, Richard (2018-01-19), "ScriptExtensions.txt changes for Indic", Recommendations to UTC #154 January 2018 on Script Proposals |
| 4.0 | U+0BF3..0BFA | 8 | | L2/18-007 | | Moore, Lisa (2018-03-19), "Action item 154-A120", UTC #154 Minutes, "Make script extension changes in version 11.0 as documented in section 6B, pages 6-9 of L2/18-039." |
| 4.1 | U+0BB6 | 1 | | L2/03-273 | | Proposal to add Tamil grantha character SHA, 2003-07-29 |
| 4.1 | U+0BB6 | 1 | | L2/03-278 | | Bhaskararao, Peri (2003-07-29), Review of a Proposal placed before UTC bearing No. L2/03-273, Proposal to encode Tamil SHA |
| 4.1 | U+0BB6 | 1 | | | N2618 | Bhaskararao, Peri (2003-09-14), Review of a Proposal placed before Unicode Technical Committee entitled 'Proposal to add Tamil Letter SHA' (L2/03-273) |
| 4.1 | U+0BE6 | 1 | | L2/04-073 | N2741 | Kaplan, Michael (2004-02-01), Proposal to add Tamil Digit Zero |
| 5.1 | U+0BD0 | 1 | | L2/06-184 | N3119 | Proposal to add Tamil Om, 2006-04-28 |
| 5.1 | U+0BD0 | 1 | | L2/06-108 | | Moore, Lisa (2006-05-25), "C.23", UTC #107 Minutes |
| 5.1 | U+0BD0 | 1 | | | N3153 (pdf, doc) | Umamaheswaran, V. S. (2007-02-16), "M49.5c", Unconfirmed minutes of WG 2 meeting 49 AIST, Akihabara, Tokyo, Japan; 2006-09-25/29 |

== See also ==
- Tamil script
- Tamil Supplement (Unicode block)
