= Vedic Extensions =

- Range: U+1CD0..U+1CFF (48 code points)
- Plane: BMP
- Scripts: Common (16 char.); Inherited (27 char.)
- Symbol sets: Vedic tone marks and signs
- Assigned: 43 code points
- Unused: 5 reserved code points

Unicode version history
- 5.2 (2009): 35 (+35)
- 6.1 (2012): 39 (+4)
- 7.0 (2014): 41 (+2)
- 10.0 (2017): 42 (+1)
- 12.0 (2019): 43 (+1)

Unicode documentation
- Code chart ∣ Web page

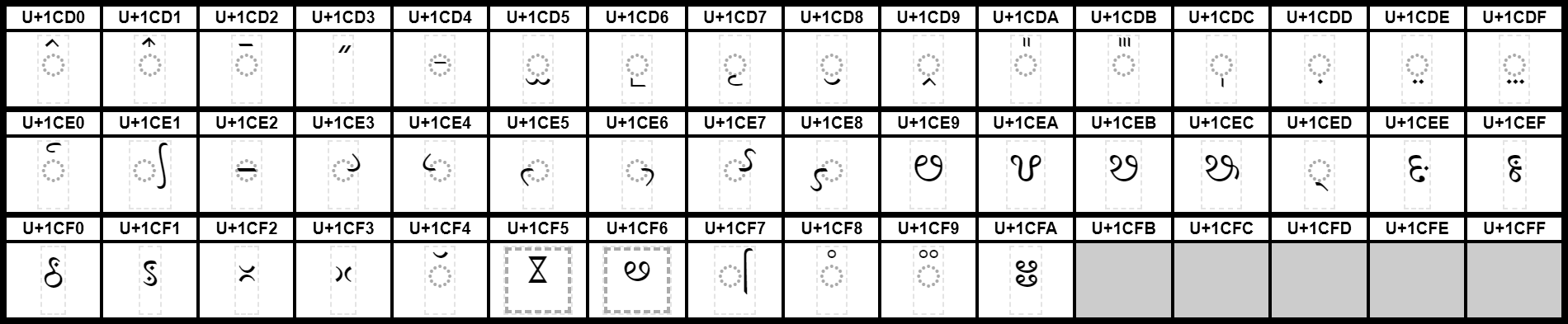
Graphical representation of the Vedic Extensions Unicode block

Vedic Extensions is a Unicode block containing characters for representing tones and other vedic symbols in Devanagari and other Indic scripts. Related symbols (also used in many scripts to represent vedic accents) are defined in two other blocks: Devanagari (U+0900–U+097F) and Devanagari Extended (U+A8E0–U+A8FF).

== Block ==
Vedic Extensions^{[1]}^{[2]} Official Unicode Consortium code chart (PDF)
	0	1	2	3	4	5	6	7	8	9	A	B	C	D	E	F
U+1CDx	᳐	᳑	᳒	᳓	᳔	᳕	᳖	᳗	᳘	᳙	᳚	᳛	᳜	᳝	᳞	᳟
U+1CEx	᳠	᳡	᳢	᳣	᳤	᳥	᳦	᳧	᳨	ᳩ	ᳪ	ᳫ	ᳬ	᳭	ᳮ	ᳯ
U+1CFx	ᳰ	ᳱ	ᳲ	ᳳ	᳴	ᳵ	ᳶ	᳷	᳸	᳹	ᳺ					
Notes: 1. As of Unicode version 16.0; 2. Grey areas indicate non-assigned code points

== History ==
The following Unicode-related documents record the purpose and process of defining specific characters in the Vedic Extensions block:

Version	Final code points (Note: Proposed code points and characters names may differ from final code points and names)	Count	L2 ID	WG2 ID	Document
5.2	U+1CD0..1CF2	35	L2/00-144		Everson, Michael (2000-04-22), Vedic Accents (untitled, undated early draft)
5.2	U+1CD0..1CF2	35	L2/00-178		Everson, Michael (2000-04-22), Encoding Vedic Accents
5.2	U+1CD0..1CF2	35	L2/00-155		Moore, Lisa (2000-05-31), Comments on Encoding Vedic Accents Proposal
5.2	U+1CD0..1CF2	35	L2/03-066		New Proposal for Vedic Characters and Symbols, 2003-02-26
5.2	U+1CD0..1CF2	35	L2/03-067		Joshi, R. K. (2003-02-27), Vedic Code Set; a draft
5.2	U+1CD0..1CF2	35	L2/04-398		Proposal to encode Vedic accents, etc., 2004-11-12
5.2	U+1CD0..1CF2	35	L2/05-063		Vikas, Om (2005-02-07), "Awaiting Updates-Devanagari", Issues in Representation of Indic Scripts in Unicode
5.2	U+1CD0..1CF2	35	L2/05-070		McGowan, Rick (2005-02-09), Indic ad hoc report
5.2	U+1CD0..1CF2	35	L2/05-026		Moore, Lisa (2005-05-16), "Scripts - Indic (C.12)", UTC #102 Minutes
5.2	U+1CD0..1CF2	35	L2/05-228		Muller, Eric (2005-08-11), Analysis of a TDIL proposal for Vedic
5.2	U+1CD0..1CF2	35	L2/06-185		Proposal for Encoding of Vedic Characters & Symbols in Unicode, 2006-05-10
5.2	U+1CD0..1CF2	35	L2/06-384		Lata, Swaran (2006-10-25), Letter from T. N. Dharmadhikari in support of Vedic repertoire
5.2	U+1CD0..1CF2	35	L2/07-060		Scharf, Peter (2007-02-02), Vedic Unicode Workshop Report
5.2	U+1CD0..1CF2	35	L2/07-095R	N3235R	Everson, Michael; Scharf, Peter; Angot, Michel; Chandrashekar, R.; Hyman, Malcolm; Rosenfield, Susan; Sastry, B. V. Venkatakrishna; Witzel, Michael (2007-04-13), Proposal to encode characters for Vedic Sanskrit in the BMP of the UCS
5.2	U+1CD0..1CF2	35	L2/07-230	N3290	Everson, Michael; Scharf, Peter; Angot, Michel; Chandrashekar, R.; Hyman, Malcolm; Rosenfield, Susan; Sastry, B. V. Venkatakrishna; Witzel, Michael (2007-07-26), Revised proposal to encode characters for Vedic Sanskrit in the BMP of the UCS
5.2	U+1CD0..1CF2	35	L2/07-254		Bhushan, E. K. Bharat (2007-08-01), Unicode for Vedic Sanskrit (letter to Mark Davis)
5.2	U+1CD0..1CF2	35	L2/07-262		Scharf, Peter (2007-08-07), Outline of the development of WG2/n3290 = L2/07-230
5.2	U+1CD0..1CF2	35	L2/07-271		Scharf, Peter (2007-08-08), Comparison of proposed characters in Lata 2006 (L2/06-185) with Scharf and Everson WG2/n3290 (L2/07-230)
5.2	U+1CD0..1CF2	35	L2/07-272		Muller, Eric (2007-08-10), "11", Report of the South Asia subcommittee
5.2	U+1CD0..1CF2	35	L2/07-396		Joshi, R. K.; Irani, Alka (2007-10-10), Proposal for Encoding of Vaidika Character and Symbols in Unicode
5.2	U+1CD0..1CF2	35	L2/07-386		Joshi, R. K. (2007-10-17), Comments on Comparison of proposed characters in Lata 2006 (L2/06-185) with Scharf and Everson WG2/n3290 (L2/07-230)
5.2	U+1CD0..1CF2	35	L2/07-388		Joshi, R. K. (2007-10-17), Following observations have been made with reference to the document No. L2/07-095 dated: 2007-04-13
5.2	U+1CD0..1CF2	35	L2/07-343	N3366	Everson, Michael; Scharf, Peter; Angot, Michel; Chandrashekar, R.; Hyman, Malcolm; Rosenfield, Susan; Sastry, B. V. Venkatakrishna; Witzel, Michael (2007-10-18), Proposal to encode 55 characters for Vedic Sanskrit in the BMP of the UCS
5.2	U+1CD0..1CF2	35	L2/07-394		Scharf, Peter (2007-10-18), Significant differences between L2/07-230 and L2/07-343
5.2	U+1CD0..1CF2	35	L2/07-395		Joshi, R. K.; et al. (2007-10-18), Request for feedback on draft proposal for encoding Vaidika characters and symbols in Unicode
5.2	U+1CD0..1CF2	35	L2/07-397		Joshi, R. K.; et al. (2007-10-18), Vaidika Vowels and Consonants
5.2	U+1CD0..1CF2	35	L2/07-400		Scharf, Peter (2007-10-18), Comments on R. K. Joshi's documents L2/07-386 and L2/07-388
5.2	U+1CD0..1CF2	35	L2/07-401		Scharf, Peter (2007-10-18), Equivalences between L2/07-396 and L2/07-343
5.2	U+1CD0..1CF2	35	L2/07-345		Moore, Lisa (2007-10-25), "Consensus 113-C19", UTC #113 Minutes
5.2	U+1CD0..1CF2	35	L2/08-035		Scharf, Peter; Rosenfield, Susan J. (2008-01-22), Vedic Revisions 2008 Jan 14, Revisions to N3366 = L2/07-343
5.2	U+1CD0..1CF2	35	L2/08-042		Joshi, R. K. (2008-01-23), Proposal for Encoding of Vaidika Characters & Symbols in Unicode
5.2	U+1CD0..1CF2	35	L2/08-043		Joshi, R. K. (2008-01-28), Vaidika Extensions A & B (Vedic evidence to accompany L2/08-042)
5.2	U+1CD0..1CF2	35	L2/08-092	N3385	Everson, Michael; Scharf, Peter (2008-01-31), Comparison between two Vedic proposals of January 2008
5.2	U+1CD0..1CF2	35	L2/08-097		Amendments to L2/08-042, L2/08-043, 2008-01-31
5.2	U+1CD0..1CF2	35	L2/08-050R	N3383R	Everson, Michael; Scharf, Peter (2008-03-06), Summary proposal to encode characters for Vedic in the BMP of the UCS
5.2	U+1CD0..1CF2	35	L2/08-096		Joshi, R. K. (2008-02-02), Comparison of L2/08-042 and L2/08-050
5.2	U+1CD0..1CF2	35	L2/08-110		Muller, Eric (2008-02-08), South Asia Subcommittee Report
5.2	U+1CD0..1CF2	35	L2/08-003		Moore, Lisa (2008-02-14), "Vedic", UTC #114 Minutes
5.2	U+1CD0..1CF2	35	L2/08-137		Bhushan, E. K. Bharat (2008-04-09), Letter re Vedic Sanskrit Proposal
5.2	U+1CD0..1CF2	35	L2/08-176	N3456R	Anderson, Deborah (2008-04-18), Summary of Vedic Characters based on N3385, N3383R, and the Unicode Pipeline
5.2	U+1CD0..1CF2	35	L2/08-196		Proposal for Encoding of Vaidika Sanskrit Characters & Symbols in the BMP of UCS, 2008-05-05
5.2	U+1CD0..1CF2	35	L2/08-216		Scharf, Peter (2008-05-08), Comments on L2/08-196 regarding the encoding of Sanskrit and Vedic
5.2	U+1CD0..1CF2	35	L2/08-214		Scharf, Peter; Rosenfield, Susan (2008-05-12), Proposal to encode Vedic Tone Yajurvedic Mid-char Svarita as 1CD4 in the BMP of the UCS
5.2	U+1CD0..1CF2	35	L2/08-218		Muller, Eric (2008-05-12), "1.2, 1.3, 1.10, 1.11", South Asia Subcommittee Report - Monday May 12, 2008
5.2	U+1CD0..1CF2	35	L2/08-219		Scharf, Peter; Chandrashekar, R. (2008-05-13), Devanagari examples of Vedic tone Yajurvedic Mid-char Svarita
5.2	U+1CD0..1CF2	35	L2/08-294		Scharf, Peter (2008-08-06), Placement of characters in Vedic, Devanagari, and Devanagari Extended blocks
5.2	U+1CD0..1CF2	35	L2/08-317		Muller, Eric (2008-08-11), "1.4, 1.5, 1.6, 1.7", South Asia Subcommittee Report
5.2	U+1CD0..1CF2	35	L2/08-318	N3453 (pdf, doc)	Umamaheswaran, V. S. (2008-08-13), "M52.18", Unconfirmed minutes of WG 2 meeting 52
5.2	U+1CD0..1CF2	35	L2/08-327		Jain, Manoj (2008-08-14), The Vedic Language
5.2	U+1CD0..1CF2	35	L2/08-273R3	N3488R3	Everson, Michael; Scharf, Peter (2008-08-21), Proposal to encode two characters for Vedic in the UCS
5.2	U+1CD0..1CF2	35	L2/08-161R2		Moore, Lisa (2008-11-05), "Vedic", UTC #115 Minutes
5.2	U+1CD0..1CF2	35	L2/08-412	N3553 (pdf, doc)	Umamaheswaran, V. S. (2008-11-05), "M53.03", Unconfirmed minutes of WG 2 meeting 53
5.2	U+1CD0..1CF2	35	L2/09-067		Lata, Swaran (2009-01-28), Encoding of Vaidika Sanskrit Characters & Symbols in the BMP of UCS
5.2	U+1CD0..1CF2	35	L2/09-234	N3603 (pdf, doc)	Umamaheswaran, V. S. (2009-07-08), "M54.03a", Unconfirmed minutes of WG 2 meeting 54
5.2	U+1CD0..1CF2	35	L2/09-104		Moore, Lisa (2009-05-20), "Consensus 119-C19", UTC #119 / L2 #216 Minutes, "Approve the name changes in section A, B, and C of document L2/09-177... [U+1CD4]"
5.2	U+1CD0..1CF2	35	L2/09-298		Sharma, Shriramana (2009-08-13), Request change name of VEDIC SIGN NIHSHVASA
5.2	U+1CD0..1CF2	35	L2/11-007		Sharma, Shriramana (2011-01-15), Request to annotate 1CD8 VEDIC TONE CANDRA BELOW
5.2	U+1CD0..1CF2	35	L2/11-042		Anderson, Deborah; McGowan, Rick; Whistler, Ken (2011-02-02), "1. Vedic", Review of Indic related L2 documents and Recommendations to the UTC
5.2	U+1CD0..1CF2	35	L2/17-424		A, Srinidhi; A, Sridatta (2017-12-08), Changes to ScriptExtensions.txt for Indic characters for Unicode 11.0
5.2	U+1CD0..1CF2	35	L2/18-039		Anderson, Deborah; Whistler, Ken; Pournader, Roozbeh; Moore, Lisa; Liang, Hai; Cook, Richard (2018-01-19), "ScriptExtensions.txt changes for Indic", Recommendations to UTC #154 January 2018 on Script Proposals
5.2	U+1CD0..1CF2	35	L2/18-007		Moore, Lisa (2018-03-19), "Action item 154-A120", UTC #154 Minutes, "Make script extension changes in version 11.0 as documented in section 6B, pages 6-9 of L2/18-039."
5.2	U+1CD0..1CF2	35	L2/18-075		A, Srinidhi; A, Sridatta (2018-03-06), Proposed Property Changes for Ardhavisargas
5.2	U+1CD0..1CF2	35	L2/18-168		Anderson, Deborah; Whistler, Ken; Pournader, Roozbeh; Moore, Lisa; Liang, Hai; Chapman, Chris; Cook, Richard (2018-04-28), "7. Vedic", Recommendations to UTC #155 April-May 2018 on Script Proposals
5.2	U+1CD0..1CF2	35	L2/18-115		Moore, Lisa (2018-05-09), "D.11 Proposed Property Changes for Ardhavisargas", UTC #155 Minutes
5.2	U+1CD0..1CF2	35	L2/18-330		A, Srinidhi; A, Sridatta (2018-11-18), Extending the ScriptExtensions property of Ardhavisarga for Oriya
5.2	U+1CD0..1CF2	35	L2/19-008		Moore, Lisa (2019-02-08), "B.14.8 Extending the ScriptExtensions property of Ardhavisarga for Oriya", UTC #158 Minutes
6.1	U+1CF3	1	L2/03-102		Vikas, Om (2003-03-04), Unicode Standard for Indic Scripts
6.1	U+1CF3	1	L2/03-101.2		Proposed Changes in Indic Scripts [Devanagari document], 2003-03-04
6.1	U+1CF3	1	L2/09-343		Sharma, Shriramana (2009-10-09), Request for encoding 1CF3 ROTATED ARDHAVISARGA
6.1	U+1CF3	1	L2/09-404		Scharf, Peter (2009-11-02), Feedback on various documents on Vedic
6.1	U+1CF3	1	L2/10-167		Anderson, Deborah; McGowan, Rick; Whistler, Ken (2010-05-05), "2", Review of Indic-related L2 documents and Recommendations to the UTC
6.1	U+1CF3	1	L2/10-108		Moore, Lisa (2010-05-19), "Consensus 123-C30", UTC #123 / L2 #220 Minutes, "Accept U+1CF3 VEDIC SIGN ROTATED ARDHAVISARGA with general category "Mc" for encoding in a future version of the standard."
6.1	U+1CF3	1	L2/10-234	N3861	Sharma, Shriramana (2010-07-09), Request for encoding 1CF3 VEDIC SIGN ROTATED ARDHAVISARGA
6.1	U+1CF3	1	L2/10-299R		Anderson, Deborah; McGowan, Rick; Whistler, Ken (2010-08-06), "Vedic Rotated Ardhavisarga", Review of Indic-related L2 documents and Recommendations to the UTC
6.1	U+1CF3	1		N3903 (pdf, doc)	"M57.02b", Unconfirmed minutes of WG2 meeting 57, 2011-03-31
6.1	U+1CF3	1	L2/18-075		A, Srinidhi; A, Sridatta (2018-03-06), Proposed Property Changes for Ardhavisargas
6.1	U+1CF3	1	L2/18-168		Anderson, Deborah; Whistler, Ken; Pournader, Roozbeh; Moore, Lisa; Liang, Hai; Chapman, Chris; Cook, Richard (2018-04-28), "7. Vedic", Recommendations to UTC #155 April-May 2018 on Script Proposals
6.1	U+1CF3	1	L2/18-115		Moore, Lisa (2018-05-09), "D.11 Proposed Property Changes for Ardhavisargas", UTC #155 Minutes
6.1	U+1CF4	1	L2/09-003R		Moore, Lisa (2009-02-12), "E.4", UTC #118 / L2 #215 Minutes
6.1	U+1CF4	1	L2/09-344 (Note: See also L2/09-404)	N3844	Sharma, Shriramana (2009-10-11), Request for encoding 1CF4 VEDIC TONE CANDRA ABOVE
6.1	U+1CF4	1	L2/10-167		Anderson, Deborah; McGowan, Rick; Whistler, Ken (2010-05-05), "3", Review of Indic-related L2 documents and Recommendations to the UTC
6.1	U+1CF4	1	L2/10-108		Moore, Lisa (2010-05-19), "Consensus 123-C31", UTC #123 / L2 #220 Minutes
6.1	U+1CF4	1		N3903 (pdf, doc)	"M57.02b", Unconfirmed minutes of WG2 meeting 57, 2011-03-31
6.1	U+1CF4	1	L2/17-424		A, Srinidhi; A, Sridatta (2017-12-08), Changes to ScriptExtensions.txt for Indic characters for Unicode 11.0
6.1	U+1CF4	1	L2/18-039		Anderson, Deborah; Whistler, Ken; Pournader, Roozbeh; Moore, Lisa; Liang, Hai; Cook, Richard (2018-01-19), "ScriptExtensions.txt changes for Indic", Recommendations to UTC #154 January 2018 on Script Proposals
6.1	U+1CF4	1	L2/18-007		Moore, Lisa (2018-03-19), "Action item 154-A120", UTC #154 Minutes, "Make script extension changes in version 11.0 as documented in section 6B, pages 6-9 of L2/18-039."
6.1	U+1CF5..1CF6	2	L2/10-257	N3881	Anderson, Deborah; Sharma, Shriramana (2010-07-26), Request to add two characters to the Vedic Extensions block
6.1	U+1CF5..1CF6	2	L2/10-299R		Anderson, Deborah; McGowan, Rick; Whistler, Ken (2010-08-06), "Two Vedic characters", Review of Indic-related L2 documents and Recommendations to the UTC
6.1	U+1CF5..1CF6	2	L2/10-221		Moore, Lisa (2010-08-23), "D.4", UTC #124 / L2 #221 Minutes
6.1	U+1CF5..1CF6	2	L2/09-342		Sharma, Shriramana (2010-10-09), Misrepresentation in Unicode of characters related to the Sanskrit sounds Jihvamuliya and Upadhmaniya
6.1	U+1CF5..1CF6	2		N3903 (pdf, doc)	"M57.02b", Unconfirmed minutes of WG2 meeting 57, 2011-03-31
6.1	U+1CF5..1CF6	2	L2/17-095		A, Srinidhi; A, Sridatta (2017-04-12), Request to change the glyphs of Vedic signs Jihvamuliya and Upadhmaniya
6.1	U+1CF5..1CF6	2	L2/17-255		Anderson, Deborah; Whistler, Ken; Pournader, Roozbeh; Moore, Lisa; Liang, Hai (2017-07-28), "15. Vedic", Recommendations to UTC #152 July-August 2017 on Script Proposals
6.1	U+1CF5..1CF6	2	L2/17-222		Moore, Lisa (2017-08-11), "D.6.2", UTC #152 Minutes
6.1	U+1CF5..1CF6	2	L2/17-319		A, Srinidhi; A, Sridatta (2017-09-12), Reconsidering the glyph change of Vedic signs Jihvamuliya and Upadhmaniya
6.1	U+1CF5..1CF6	2	L2/17-384		Anderson, Deborah; Whistler, Ken; Pournader, Roozbeh; Moore, Lisa; Liang, Hai (2017-10-22), "9. Vedic", Recommendations to UTC #153 October 2017 on Script Proposals
6.1	U+1CF5..1CF6	2	L2/17-362		Moore, Lisa (2018-02-02), "D.10 Reconsidering the glyph change of Vedic signs Jihvamuliya and Upadhmaniya", UTC #153 Minutes
7.0	U+1CF8..1CF9	2	L2/11-267R	N4134	Sharma, Shriramana (2011-07-07), Proposal to encode svara markers for the Jaiminiya Archika
7.0	U+1CF8..1CF9	2	L2/11-298		Anderson, Deborah; McGowan, Rick; Whistler, Ken (2011-07-27), "1. Vedic", South Asian subcommittee report
7.0	U+1CF8..1CF9	2	L2/11-326		Palaniappan, S. (2011-08-04), Comment on UTC document L2/11-186
7.0	U+1CF8..1CF9	2	L2/11-261R2		Moore, Lisa (2011-08-16), "D.10", UTC #128 / L2 #225 Minutes
7.0	U+1CF8..1CF9	2		N4253 (pdf, doc)	"M59.16b", Unconfirmed minutes of WG 2 meeting 59, 2012-09-12
10.0	U+1CF7	1	L2/15-204		Anderson, Deborah; et al. (2015-07-25), "1. Vedic", Recommendations to UTC #144 July 2015 on Script Proposals
10.0	U+1CF7	1	L2/15-160R		Sharma, Shriramana (2015-07-31), Proposal to encode 1CF7 VEDIC SIGN ATIKRAMA
10.0	U+1CF7	1	L2/15-187		Moore, Lisa (2015-08-11), "D.3.1", UTC #144 Minutes
10.0	U+1CF7	1		N4739	"M64.06", Unconfirmed minutes of WG 2 meeting 64, 2016-08-31
12.0	U+1CFA	1	L2/17-117	N4820	Pandey, Anshuman (2017-04-25), Proposal to encode a nasal character in Vedic Extensions (revised)
12.0	U+1CFA	1	L2/17-153		Anderson, Deborah (2017-05-17), "8. Vedic", Recommendations to UTC #151 May 2017 on Script Proposals
12.0	U+1CFA	1	L2/17-103		Moore, Lisa (2017-05-18), "D.9.3", UTC #151 Minutes

== See also ==
- Devanagari in Unicode
