= Chandas (typeface) =

OpenType font for the Devanagari script

- Classification: Non-Latin
- Designer(s): Mihail Bayaryn
- License: GNU GPL

Chandas is a Unicode compatible OpenType font for the Devanagari script. The font is notable for containing a particularly extensive set of conjunct ligatures for Sanskrit and also supporting Vedic accents, which were unavailable in other Devanagari fonts when it was released. Though the font was designed primarily for writing Sanskrit, it may be used for all languages written in the Devanagari script, including Hindi, Konkani, Marathi, and Nepali.

The font was developed and is maintained by Mihail Bayaryn, and is released under the GNU General Public License.

== Detail ==
The Chandas font "contains 4347 glyphs: 325 half-forms, 960 half-forms context-variations, 2743 ligature-signs." The font is, therefore, useful for those who want to see old Sanskrit texts in their original form. "It is designed especially for Vedic and Classical Sanskrit but can also be used for Hindi, Nepali and other modern Indian languages. The font includes Vedic accents and many additional signs and provides maximal support for Devanagari script."

The Chandas font has glyphs in the Southern (Mumbai) style of Devanagari script, which is the most commonly used today, but there is a companion font, Uttara which has glyphs that follow the old Northern or Kolkata style of Devanagari.

== Format and license ==
The Chandas font is available in OpenType format using TrueType outlines. It is distributed under the terms of the GNU General Public Licence. It may be downloaded from the SanskritWeb.net site. The VOLT project files containing the source of the OpenType lookups in the font are also available.

The font is included in several Linux distributions.

== Related links ==
- Devanagari
- Kiran fonts
- Kruti Dev
- Sanskrit
- Vedas
