= Devanagari (Unicode block) =

- Range: U+0900..U+097F (128 code points)
- Plane: BMP
- Scripts: Devanagari (122 char.); Common (2 char.); Inherited (4 char.)
- Major alphabets: Hindi; Sanskrit; Marathi; Nepali; Rajasthani; Bhojpuri
- Assigned: 128 code points
- Unused: 0 reserved code points
- Source standards: ISCII

Unicode version history
- 1.0.0 (1991): 104 (+104)
- 4.0 (2003): 105 (+1)
- 4.1 (2005): 106 (+1)
- 5.0 (2006): 110 (+4)
- 5.1 (2008): 112 (+2)
- 5.2 (2009): 117 (+5)
- 6.0 (2010): 127 (+10)
- 7.0 (2014): 128 (+1)

Unicode documentation
- Code chart ∣ Web page

Devanagari is a Unicode block containing characters for writing languages such as Hindi, Marathi, Bhojpuri, Rajasthani, Bodo, Maithili, Sindhi, Nepali, and Sanskrit, among others. In its original incarnation, the code points U+0900..U+0954 were a direct copy of the characters A0-F4 from the 1988 ISCII standard. The Bengali, Gurmukhi, Gujarati, Oriya, Tamil, Telugu, Kannada, and Malayalam blocks were similarly all based on their ISCII encodings.

== Block ==
Devanagari^{[1]} Official Unicode Consortium code chart (PDF)
	0	1	2	3	4	5	6	7	8	9	A	B	C	D	E	F
U+090x	ऀ	ँ	ं	ः	ऄ	अ	आ	इ	ई	उ	ऊ	ऋ	ऌ	ऍ	ऎ	ए
U+091x	ऐ	ऑ	ऒ	ओ	औ	क	ख	ग	घ	ङ	च	छ	ज	झ	ञ	ट
U+092x	ठ	ड	ढ	ण	त	थ	द	ध	न	ऩ	प	फ	ब	भ	म	य
U+093x	र	ऱ	ल	ळ	ऴ	व	श	ष	स	ह	ऺ	ऻ	़	ऽ	ा	ि
U+094x	ी	ु	ू	ृ	ॄ	ॅ	ॆ	े	ै	ॉ	ॊ	ो	ौ	्	ॎ	ॏ
U+095x	ॐ	॑	॒	॓	॔	ॕ	ॖ	ॗ	क़	ख़	ग़	ज़	ड़	ढ़	फ़	य़
U+096x	ॠ	ॡ	ॢ	ॣ	।	॥	०	१	२	३	४	५	६	७	८	९
U+097x	॰	ॱ	ॲ	ॳ	ॴ	ॵ	ॶ	ॷ	ॸ	ॹ	ॺ	ॻ	ॼ	ॽ	ॾ	ॿ
Notes: 1. As of Unicode version 16.0

== History ==
The following Unicode-related documents record the purpose and process of defining specific characters in the Devanagari block:

Version	Final code points (Note: Proposed code points and characters names may differ from final code points and names)	Count	UTC ID	L2 ID	WG2 ID	Document
1.0.0	U+0901..0903, 0905..0939, 093C..094D, 0950..0954, 0958..0970	104		X3L2/90-124	N667	"36. 36. Devanagari script", Minutes of SC2/WG2 Meeting 18 in Munich, 1990-11-12
1.0.0	U+0901..0903, 0905..0939, 093C..094D, 0950..0954, 0958..0970	104	UTC/1991-056			Whistler, Ken, Indic Charts: Devanagari, Bengali, Gurmukhi, Gujarati, Oriya, Tamil, Telugu, Kannada, Malayalam
1.0.0	U+0901..0903, 0905..0939, 093C..094D, 0950..0954, 0958..0970	104	UTC/1991-057			Whistler, Ken, Indic names list
1.0.0	U+0901..0903, 0905..0939, 093C..094D, 0950..0954, 0958..0970	104	UTC/1991-048B			Whistler, Ken (1991-03-27), "III. L. Walk In proposals", Draft Minutes from the UTC meeting #46 day 2, 3/27 at Apple
1.0.0	U+0901..0903, 0905..0939, 093C..094D, 0950..0954, 0958..0970	104		L2/99-235		Nepali Font Standards - White Paper Version 2
1.0.0	U+0901..0903, 0905..0939, 093C..094D, 0950..0954, 0958..0970	104	UTC/1999-001	L2/99-026		Agenbroad, James E. (1999-01-27), 3.0 Devanagari--Eyelash RA (3rd version)
1.0.0	U+0901..0903, 0905..0939, 093C..094D, 0950..0954, 0958..0970	104		L2/99-046		Becker, Joe (1999-02-04), Specification of UTC Resolution on Eyelash RA
1.0.0	U+0901..0903, 0905..0939, 093C..094D, 0950..0954, 0958..0970	104		L2/99-234	N1999	Proposal for Encoding Nepalese script in the ISO/IEC 10646, 1999-03-05
1.0.0	U+0901..0903, 0905..0939, 093C..094D, 0950..0954, 0958..0970	104		L2/99-054R		Aliprand, Joan (1999-06-21), "Eyelash RA and Eyelash RA (continued)", Approved Minutes from the UTC/L2 meeting in Palo Alto, February 3-5, 1999
1.0.0	U+0901..0903, 0905..0939, 093C..094D, 0950..0954, 0958..0970	104			N2055	Ross, Hugh McGregor (1999-07-29), Comment on Proposal for Nepalese Script
1.0.0	U+0901..0903, 0905..0939, 093C..094D, 0950..0954, 0958..0970	104		L2/00-010	N2103	Umamaheswaran, V. S. (2000-01-05), "8.5", Minutes of WG 2 meeting 37, Copenhagen, Denmark: 1999-09-13—16
1.0.0	U+0901..0903, 0905..0939, 093C..094D, 0950..0954, 0958..0970	104		L2/01-303		Vikas, Om (2001-07-26), Letter from the Government from India on "Draft for Unicode Standard for Indian Scripts"
1.0.0	U+0901..0903, 0905..0939, 093C..094D, 0950..0954, 0958..0970	104		L2/01-304		Feedback on Unicode Standard 3.0, 2001-08-02
1.0.0	U+0901..0903, 0905..0939, 093C..094D, 0950..0954, 0958..0970	104		L2/01-305		McGowan, Rick (2001-08-08), Draft UTC Response to L2/01-304, "Feedback on Unicode Standard 3.0"
1.0.0	U+0901..0903, 0905..0939, 093C..094D, 0950..0954, 0958..0970	104		L2/01-430R		McGowan, Rick (2001-11-20), UTC Response to L2/01-304, "Feedback on Unicode Standard 3.0"
1.0.0	U+0901..0903, 0905..0939, 093C..094D, 0950..0954, 0958..0970	104		L2/02-017		Whistler, Ken (2002-01-14), Character Properties for avagrahas, etc.
1.0.0	U+0901..0903, 0905..0939, 093C..094D, 0950..0954, 0958..0970	104		L2/02-215	N2466	Sato, T. K. (2002-05-15), Status in Nepal on n2055 (UK comment on encoding request for Nepali n1999-Nepal)
1.0.0	U+0901..0903, 0905..0939, 093C..094D, 0950..0954, 0958..0970	104		L2/04-279		Constable, Peter (2004-06-30), Proposal on Clarification and Consolidation of the Function of ZERO WIDTH JOINER in Indic Scripts
1.0.0	U+0901..0903, 0905..0939, 093C..094D, 0950..0954, 0958..0970	104		L2/04-328		Leca, Antoine (2004-08-04), Response to Public Review Issue #37
1.0.0	U+0901..0903, 0905..0939, 093C..094D, 0950..0954, 0958..0970	104		L2/04-418		Muller, Eric (2004-11-18), "PRI: script specific Indic dandas", Report of the Indic ad-hoc
1.0.0	U+0901..0903, 0905..0939, 093C..094D, 0950..0954, 0958..0970	104		L2/04-361		Moore, Lisa (2004-11-23), "101-A101", UTC #101 Minutes
1.0.0	U+0901..0903, 0905..0939, 093C..094D, 0950..0954, 0958..0970	104		L2/05-049		Public Review Issue #59, Disunification of Dandas, 2005-01-28
1.0.0	U+0901..0903, 0905..0939, 093C..094D, 0950..0954, 0958..0970	104		L2/05-055		Muller, Eric (2005-01-29), Comments on PRI 59: Script Specific Danda and Double Danda
1.0.0	U+0901..0903, 0905..0939, 093C..094D, 0950..0954, 0958..0970	104		L2/05-147		Muller, Eric (2005-05-11), Comments on PRI 65: Devanagari Eyelash Ra
1.0.0	U+0901..0903, 0905..0939, 093C..094D, 0950..0954, 0958..0970	104		L2/06-203		Baums, Stefan (2006-05-14), Latin Dandas
1.0.0	U+0901..0903, 0905..0939, 093C..094D, 0950..0954, 0958..0970	104		L2/06-373		Proposal for additional character, 2006-11-04
1.0.0	U+0901..0903, 0905..0939, 093C..094D, 0950..0954, 0958..0970	104		L2/06-398		Pandey, Anshuman (2006-12-15), Comments on L2/06-373 (addition of 'apostrophe' to Devanagari)
1.0.0	U+0901..0903, 0905..0939, 093C..094D, 0950..0954, 0958..0970	104		L2/08-086		Danda Guidelines Draft, 2008-01-30
1.0.0	U+0901..0903, 0905..0939, 093C..094D, 0950..0954, 0958..0970	104		L2/08-118R	N3457 (pdf, doc)	Criteria for the encoding of script-specific dandas, 2008-03-02
1.0.0	U+0901..0903, 0905..0939, 093C..094D, 0950..0954, 0958..0970	104		L2/08-197		Representation of Bodo, Dogri and Maithili languages in Unicode Standard, 2008-05-06
1.0.0	U+0901..0903, 0905..0939, 093C..094D, 0950..0954, 0958..0970	104		L2/08-210		Lata, Swaran (2008-05-07), Usage examples for Bodo, Dogri, Maithili tone marker
1.0.0	U+0901..0903, 0905..0939, 093C..094D, 0950..0954, 0958..0970	104		L2/09-340		Sharma, Shriramana (2009-10-09), Request for change of annotation of 0951 Devanagari Stress Sign Udatta
1.0.0	U+0901..0903, 0905..0939, 093C..094D, 0950..0954, 0958..0970	104		L2/09-423		Sharma, Shriramana (2009-11-01), Request for an annotation for the generic Indic danda-s
1.0.0	U+0901..0903, 0905..0939, 093C..094D, 0950..0954, 0958..0970	104		L2/10-015R		Moore, Lisa (2010-02-09), "Consensus 122-C24", UTC #122 / L2 #219 Minutes, "Change the script of U+0970 DEVANAGARI ABBREVIATION SIGN to Devanagari for Unicode 6.0."
1.0.0	U+0901..0903, 0905..0939, 093C..094D, 0950..0954, 0958..0970	104		L2/10-167		Anderson, Deborah; McGowan, Rick; Whistler, Ken (2010-05-05), "4", Review of Indic-related L2 documents and Recommendations to the UTC
1.0.0	U+0901..0903, 0905..0939, 093C..094D, 0950..0954, 0958..0970	104		L2/12-029		Whistler, Ken (2012-01-26), Error in ScriptExtensions.txt (Takri use of dandas)
1.0.0	U+0901..0903, 0905..0939, 093C..094D, 0950..0954, 0958..0970	104		L2/12-106		Sharma, Shriramana (2012-03-17), "Generic Indic", Request for editorial updates to various Indic scripts
1.0.0	U+0901..0903, 0905..0939, 093C..094D, 0950..0954, 0958..0970	104		L2/12-147		Anderson, Deborah; McGowan, Rick; Whistler, Ken (2012-04-25), "I. INDIC", Review of Indic-related L2 documents and Recommendations to the UTC
1.0.0	U+0901..0903, 0905..0939, 093C..094D, 0950..0954, 0958..0970	104		L2/12-164		Sharma, Shriramana (2012-05-02), "Devanagari", Further editorial updates for Indic
1.0.0	U+0901..0903, 0905..0939, 093C..094D, 0950..0954, 0958..0970	104		L2/13-202		McGowan, Rick (2013-11-01), "Dandas need more scripts in ScriptExtensions.txt", Comments on Public Review Issues (July 30 - Oct 31, 2013)
1.0.0	U+0901..0903, 0905..0939, 093C..094D, 0950..0954, 0958..0970	104		L2/13-224		Pournader, Roozbeh (2013-11-07), Samples for usage of dandas in Gujarati, Telugu, Kannada, Malayalam, and Tamil
1.0.0	U+0901..0903, 0905..0939, 093C..094D, 0950..0954, 0958..0970	104		L2/17-424		A, Srinidhi; A, Sridatta (2017-12-08), Changes to ScriptExtensions.txt for Indic characters for Unicode 11.0
1.0.0	U+0901..0903, 0905..0939, 093C..094D, 0950..0954, 0958..0970	104		L2/18-039		Anderson, Deborah; Whistler, Ken; Pournader, Roozbeh; Moore, Lisa; Liang, Hai; Cook, Richard (2018-01-19), "ScriptExtensions.txt changes for Indic", Recommendations to UTC #154 January 2018 on Script Proposals
1.0.0	U+0901..0903, 0905..0939, 093C..094D, 0950..0954, 0958..0970	104		L2/18-007		Moore, Lisa (2018-03-19), "Action item 154-A120", UTC #154 Minutes, "Make script extension changes in version 11.0 as documented in section 6B, pages 6-9 of L2/18-039."
1.0.0	U+0901..0903, 0905..0939, 093C..094D, 0950..0954, 0958..0970	104		L2/19-054		Pournader, Roozbeh (2019-01-11), Feedback on Properties
1.0.0	U+0901..0903, 0905..0939, 093C..094D, 0950..0954, 0958..0970	104		L2/19-047		Anderson, Deborah; et al. (2019-01-13), "29. PROPERTIES", Recommendations to UTC #158 January 2019 on Script Proposals
1.0.0	U+0901..0903, 0905..0939, 093C..094D, 0950..0954, 0958..0970	104		L2/19-008		Moore, Lisa (2019-02-08), "Consensus 158-C21", UTC #158 Minutes, "Change the script property of U+0953 DEVANAGARI GRAVE ACCENT and U+0954 DEVANAGARI ACUTE ACCENT from "Devanagari" to "Inherited", for Unicode version 12.0."
1.0.0	U+0901..0903, 0905..0939, 093C..094D, 0950..0954, 0958..0970	104		L2/20-055		Pournader, Roozbeh (2020-01-16), Proposed sequences for composition exclusions
1.0.0	U+0901..0903, 0905..0939, 093C..094D, 0950..0954, 0958..0970	104		L2/20-015R		Moore, Lisa (2020-05-14), "B.13.1.1 Proposed sequences for composition exclusions", Draft Minutes of UTC Meeting 162
4.0	U+0904	1		L2/01-431R (Note: See also L2/01-303, L2/01-304, L2/01-305, and L2/01-430R)		McGowan, Rick (2001-11-08), Actions for UTC and Editorial Committee in response to L2/01-430R
4.0	U+0904	1		L2/01-405R		Moore, Lisa (2001-12-12), "Consensus 89-C19", Minutes from the UTC/L2 meeting in Mountain View, November 6-9, 2001, "Accept the twelve Indic characters with names and coding positions as documented in L2/01-431R"
4.0	U+0904	1		L2/02-117	N2425	McGowan, Rick (2002-03-21), Additional Characters for Indic Scripts
4.0	U+0904	1		L2/17-425		A, Srinidhi; A, Sridatta (2017-12-08), Request to annotate DEVANAGARI LETTER SHORT A
4.0	U+0904	1		L2/18-039		Anderson, Deborah; Whistler, Ken; Pournader, Roozbeh; Moore, Lisa; Liang, Hai; Cook, Richard (2018-01-19), "b. SHORT A", Recommendations to UTC #154 January 2018 on Script Proposals
4.0	U+0904	1		L2/18-115		Moore, Lisa (2018-05-09), "D.3.2", UTC #155 Minutes
4.1	U+097D	1		L2/02-394	N2543	Constable, Peter; Smith, Steve (2002-11-01), Proposal for Encoding Devanagari Glottal Stop
5.0	U+097B..097C, 097E..097F	4		L2/02-402		Bhaskararao, Peri (2002-12-20), Comments on Revision of Unicode Standard 3.0 for Devanagari Script
5.0	U+097B..097C, 097E..097F	4		L2/03-102		Vikas, Om (2003-03-04), Unicode Standard for Indic Scripts
5.0	U+097B..097C, 097E..097F	4		L2/03-101.2		Proposed Changes in Indic Scripts [Devanagari document], 2003-03-04
5.0	U+097B..097C, 097E..097F	4		L2/05-063		Vikas, Om (2005-02-07), "Awaiting Updates-Devanagari", Issues in Representation of Indic Scripts in Unicode
5.0	U+097B..097C, 097E..097F	4		L2/05-070		McGowan, Rick (2005-02-09), Indic ad hoc report
5.0	U+097B..097C, 097E..097F	4		L2/05-082	N2934	Everson, Michael (2005-03-30), Proposal to add four characters for Sindhi to the BMP of the UCS
5.0	U+097B..097C, 097E..097F	4		L2/05-026		Moore, Lisa (2005-05-16), "Scripts - Indic (C.12)", UTC #102 Minutes
5.0	U+097B..097C, 097E..097F	4		L2/05-108R		Moore, Lisa (2005-08-26), "Additional Sindhi Characters (C.3)", UTC #103 Minutes
5.0	U+097B..097C, 097E..097F	4		L2/05-279		Moore, Lisa (2005-11-10), "Motion 105-M3", UTC #105 Minutes
5.0	U+097B..097C, 097E..097F	4			N2953 (pdf, doc)	Umamaheswaran, V. S. (2006-02-16), "7.4.1", Unconfirmed minutes of WG 2 meeting 47, Sophia Antipolis, France; 2005-09-12/15
5.1	U+0971	1		L2/06-137	N3111, N3125	Kew, Jonathan; Smith, Steve (2006-04-20), Proposal to encode Devanagari Sign High Spacing Dot
5.1	U+0971	1		L2/06-108		Moore, Lisa (2006-05-25), "Devanagari (C.1)", UTC #107 Minutes
5.1	U+0971	1			N3153 (pdf, doc)	Umamaheswaran, V. S. (2007-02-16), "M49.5b", Unconfirmed minutes of WG 2 meeting 49 AIST, Akihabara, Tokyo, Japan; 2006-09-25/29
5.1	U+0972	1		L2/07-027		Constable, Peter (2007-01-23), Encoded Representation of Devanagari Candra A
5.1	U+0972	1		L2/07-015		Moore, Lisa (2007-02-08), "Devanagari Candra A (C.18)", UTC #110 Minutes
5.1	U+0972	1			N3249	Proposal to Encode Devanagari Letter Candra A in the UCS [originally N2809], 2007-04-20
5.1	U+0972	1		L2/07-133		Constable, Peter (2007-04-30), Proposal to Encode Devanagari Letter Candra A in the UCS
5.1	U+0972	1		L2/07-268	N3253 (pdf, doc)	Umamaheswaran, V. S. (2007-07-26), "M50.1", Unconfirmed minutes of WG 2 meeting 50, Frankfurt-am-Main, Germany; 2007-04-24/27
5.2	U+0900, 094E, 0955, 0979..097A	5		L2/00-155		Moore, Lisa (2000-05-31), Comments on Encoding Vedic Accents Proposal
5.2	U+0900, 094E, 0955, 0979..097A	5		L2/03-066		New Proposal for Vedic Characters and Symbols, 2003-02-26
5.2	U+0900, 094E, 0955, 0979..097A	5		L2/03-067		Joshi, R. K. (2003-02-27), Vedic Code Set; a draft
5.2	U+0900, 094E, 0955, 0979..097A	5		L2/04-398		Proposal to encode Vedic accents, etc., 2004-11-12
5.2	U+0900, 094E, 0955, 0979..097A	5		L2/05-228		Muller, Eric (2005-08-11), Analysis of a TDIL proposal for Vedic
5.2	U+0900, 094E, 0955, 0979..097A	5		L2/06-185		Proposal for Encoding of Vedic Characters & Symbols in Unicode, 2006-05-10
5.2	U+0900, 094E, 0955, 0979..097A	5		L2/06-384		Lata, Swaran (2006-10-25), Letter from T. N. Dharmadhikari in support of Vedic repertoire
5.2	U+0900, 094E, 0955, 0979..097A	5		L2/07-060		Scharf, Peter (2007-02-02), Vedic Unicode Workshop Report
5.2	U+0900, 094E, 0955, 0979..097A	5		L2/07-095R	N3235R	Everson, Michael; Scharf, Peter; Angot, Michel; Chandrashekar, R.; Hyman, Malcolm; Rosenfield, Susan; Sastry, B. V. Venkatakrishna; Witzel, Michael (2007-04-13), Proposal to encode characters for Vedic Sanskrit in the BMP of the UCS
5.2	U+0900, 094E, 0955, 0979..097A	5		L2/07-230	N3290	Everson, Michael; Scharf, Peter; Angot, Michel; Chandrashekar, R.; Hyman, Malcolm; Rosenfield, Susan; Sastry, B. V. Venkatakrishna; Witzel, Michael (2007-07-26), Revised proposal to encode characters for Vedic Sanskrit in the BMP of the UCS
5.2	U+0900, 094E, 0955, 0979..097A	5		L2/07-254		Bhushan, E. K. Bharat (2007-08-01), Unicode for Vedic Sanskrit (letter to Mark Davis)
5.2	U+0900, 094E, 0955, 0979..097A	5		L2/07-262		Scharf, Peter (2007-08-07), Outline of the development of WG2/n3290 = L2/07-230
5.2	U+0900, 094E, 0955, 0979..097A	5		L2/07-271		Scharf, Peter (2007-08-08), Comparison of proposed characters in Lata 2006 (L2/06-185) with Scharf and Everson WG2/n3290 (L2/07-230)
5.2	U+0900, 094E, 0955, 0979..097A	5		L2/07-272		Muller, Eric (2007-08-10), "11", Report of the South Asia subcommittee
5.2	U+0900, 094E, 0955, 0979..097A	5		L2/07-396		Joshi, R. K.; Irani, Alka (2007-10-10), Proposal for Encoding of Vaidika Character and Symbols in Unicode
5.2	U+0900, 094E, 0955, 0979..097A	5		L2/07-386		Joshi, R. K. (2007-10-17), Comments on Comparison of proposed characters in Lata 2006 (L2/06-185) with Scharf and Everson WG2/n3290 (L2/07-230)
5.2	U+0900, 094E, 0955, 0979..097A	5		L2/07-388		Joshi, R. K. (2007-10-17), Following observations have been made with reference to the document No. L2/07-095 dated: 2007-04-13
5.2	U+0900, 094E, 0955, 0979..097A	5		L2/07-343	N3366	Everson, Michael; Scharf, Peter; Angot, Michel; Chandrashekar, R.; Hyman, Malcolm; Rosenfield, Susan; Sastry, B. V. Venkatakrishna; Witzel, Michael (2007-10-18), Proposal to encode 55 characters for Vedic Sanskrit in the BMP of the UCS
5.2	U+0900, 094E, 0955, 0979..097A	5		L2/07-394		Scharf, Peter (2007-10-18), Significant differences between L2/07-230 and L2/07-343
5.2	U+0900, 094E, 0955, 0979..097A	5		L2/07-395		Joshi, R. K.; et al. (2007-10-18), Request for feedback on draft proposal for encoding Vaidika characters and symbols in Unicode
5.2	U+0900, 094E, 0955, 0979..097A	5		L2/07-397		Joshi, R. K.; et al. (2007-10-18), Vaidika Vowels and Consonants
5.2	U+0900, 094E, 0955, 0979..097A	5		L2/07-400		Scharf, Peter (2007-10-18), Comments on R. K. Joshi's documents L2/07-386 and L2/07-388
5.2	U+0900, 094E, 0955, 0979..097A	5		L2/07-401		Scharf, Peter (2007-10-18), Equivalences between L2/07-396 and L2/07-343
5.2	U+0900, 094E, 0955, 0979..097A	5		L2/07-345		Moore, Lisa (2007-10-25), "Consensus 113-C19", UTC #113 Minutes
5.2	U+0900, 094E, 0955, 0979..097A	5		L2/08-035		Scharf, Peter; Rosenfield, Susan J. (2008-01-22), Vedic Revisions 2008 Jan 14, Revisions to N3366 = L2/07-343
5.2	U+0900, 094E, 0955, 0979..097A	5		L2/08-042		Joshi, R. K. (2008-01-23), Proposal for Encoding of Vaidika Characters & Symbols in Unicode
5.2	U+0900, 094E, 0955, 0979..097A	5		L2/08-043		Joshi, R. K. (2008-01-28), Vaidika Extensions A & B (Vedic evidence to accompany L2/08-042)
5.2	U+0900, 094E, 0955, 0979..097A	5		L2/08-092	N3385	Everson, Michael; Scharf, Peter (2008-01-31), Comparison between two Vedic proposals of January 2008
5.2	U+0900, 094E, 0955, 0979..097A	5		L2/08-097		Amendments to L2/08-042, L2/08-043, 2008-01-31
5.2	U+0900, 094E, 0955, 0979..097A	5		L2/08-050R	N3383R	Everson, Michael; Scharf, Peter (2008-03-06), Summary proposal to encode characters for Vedic in the BMP of the UCS
5.2	U+0900, 094E, 0955, 0979..097A	5		L2/08-096		Joshi, R. K. (2008-02-02), Comparison of L2/08-042 and L2/08-050
5.2	U+0900, 094E, 0955, 0979..097A	5		L2/08-110		Muller, Eric (2008-02-08), South Asia Subcommittee Report
5.2	U+0900, 094E, 0955, 0979..097A	5		L2/08-003		Moore, Lisa (2008-02-14), "Vedic", UTC #114 Minutes
5.2	U+0900, 094E, 0955, 0979..097A	5		L2/08-176	N3456R	Anderson, Deborah (2008-04-18), Summary of Vedic Characters based on N3385, N3383R, and the Unicode Pipeline
5.2	U+0900, 094E, 0955, 0979..097A	5		L2/08-196		Proposal for Encoding of Vaidika Sanskrit Characters & Symbols in the BMP of UCS, 2008-05-05
5.2	U+0900, 094E, 0955, 0979..097A	5		L2/08-216		Scharf, Peter (2008-05-08), Comments on L2/08-196 regarding the encoding of Sanskrit and Vedic
5.2	U+0900, 094E, 0955, 0979..097A	5		L2/08-294		Scharf, Peter (2008-08-06), Placement of characters in Vedic, Devanagari, and Devanagari Extended blocks
5.2	U+0900, 094E, 0955, 0979..097A	5		L2/08-317		Muller, Eric (2008-08-11), "1.1", South Asia Subcommittee Report
5.2	U+0900, 094E, 0955, 0979..097A	5		L2/08-318	N3453 (pdf, doc)	Umamaheswaran, V. S. (2008-08-13), "M52.18", Unconfirmed minutes of WG 2 meeting 52
5.2	U+0900, 094E, 0955, 0979..097A	5		L2/08-253R2		Moore, Lisa (2008-08-19), "Vedic (B.15.2, E.1)", UTC #116 Minutes
5.2	U+0900, 094E, 0955, 0979..097A	5		L2/08-273R3	N3488R3	Everson, Michael; Scharf, Peter (2008-08-21), Proposal to encode two characters for Vedic in the UCS
5.2	U+0900, 094E, 0955, 0979..097A	5		L2/08-412	N3553 (pdf, doc)	Umamaheswaran, V. S. (2008-11-05), "M53.03", Unconfirmed minutes of WG 2 meeting 53
5.2	U+0900, 094E, 0955, 0979..097A	5		L2/09-067		Lata, Swaran (2009-01-28), Encoding of Vaidika Sanskrit Characters & Symbols in the BMP of UCS
6.0	U+093A..093B, 094F, 0956..0957, 0973..0977	10		L2/08-250	N3480	Everson, Michael; Satpute, Pravin (2006-07-03), Proposal to add four characters for Kashmiri to the BMP
6.0	U+093A..093B, 094F, 0956..0957, 0973..0977	10		L2/09-012		Lata, Swaran (2009-01-07), Encoding of additional characters in Unicode for representation of Kashmiri
6.0	U+093A..093B, 094F, 0956..0957, 0973..0977	10		L2/09-311		Lata, Swaran (2009-08-11), Letter from Swaran Lata re Kashmiri Additions to Devanagari
6.0	U+093A..093B, 094F, 0956..0957, 0973..0977	10		L2/09-389	N3731	Everson, Michael (2009-09-18), Consensus on Kashmiri additions for Devanagari
6.0	U+093A..093B, 094F, 0956..0957, 0973..0977	10		L2/09-369	N3710	Proposal to add Six characters in the Devanagari block for representation of Kashmiri language in Devanagari script, 2009-10-14
6.0	U+093A..093B, 094F, 0956..0957, 0973..0977	10		L2/09-377	N3725	Pandey, Anshuman (2009-10-26), Comments on India's Proposal to Add Devanagari Characters for Kashmiri (N3710 L2/09-369)
6.0	U+093A..093B, 094F, 0956..0957, 0973..0977	10			N3703 (pdf, doc)	Umamaheswaran, V. S. (2010-04-13), "M55.7", Unconfirmed minutes of WG 2 meeting no. 55, Tokyo 2009-10-26/30
6.0	U+093A..093B, 094F, 0956..0957, 0973..0977	10		L2/09-403		Pandey, Anshuman (2009-11-01), Comments on 'Consensus on Kashmiri additions for Devanagari' (N3727 L2/09-389)
6.0	U+093A..093B, 094F, 0956..0957, 0973..0977	10		L2/09-335R		Moore, Lisa (2009-11-10), "Consensus 121-C15", UTC #121 / L2 #218 Minutes
7.0	U+0978	1		L2/11-042		Anderson, Deborah; McGowan, Rick; Whistler, Ken (2011-02-02), "3. Devanagari DDA", Review of Indic related L2 documents and Recommendations to the UTC
7.0	U+0978	1		L2/11-016		Moore, Lisa (2011-02-15), "D.3.2", UTC #126 / L2 #223 Minutes
7.0	U+0978	1		L2/10-475R	N3970	Pandey, Anshuman (2011-05-23), Proposal to Encode the Marwari Letter DDA for Devanagari
7.0	U+0978	1			N4103	"11.2.13 Marwari Letter DDA in Devanagari", Unconfirmed minutes of WG 2 meeting 58, 2012-01-03

== See also ==
- Devanagari in Unicode
