= Kiran (typeface) =

- Category: San-serif
- Classification: Non-Latin
- Designer: Kiran Bhave
- Date released: 1999
- Design based on: Shivaji

Kiran (Marathi: किरण) is a free Devanagari typeface and a non-Unicode font created by Kiran Bhave first released in 1999.

== Description ==
The keyboard layout is an enhanced version of the Shivaji typeface and have the same keyboard layout. The typeface is used create websites using the Devanagari script.

== Creator ==
Kiran Bhave (Marathi: किरण भावे) is from Sanpada (East), Navi Mumbai.

== Timeline ==
- 1999: kiran.ttf was created
- 2000: The amruta.ttf and aarti.ttf fonts were created
- 2001: Website KiranFont.com was registered and made operational
- 2004: KF-Kiran.ttf, KF-Amruta.ttf, KF-Aarti.ttf, KF-Aditya.ttf, KF-Arun.ttf, KF-Mitra, KF-Ravi were made available for a fee
- 2006: The ability to pay using PayPal was added
- 2008: KF-Kiran.ttf, KF-Amruta.ttf, KF-Aarti.ttf became free. Support for kiran.ttf, amruta.ttf, and aarti.ttf was discontinued to provide a consistent keyboard layout for free and paid users
- 2010: A free tool to convert text from Unicode to the Kiran font was made available
- 2012: The Indian Rupee Currency Symbol was added in all the fonts. The character is mapped at ASCII 0226 (Alt+0226) and its official Unicode code point U+20b9
- 2012: KF-Prachi.ttf, KF-Jui.ttf were released as free fonts
- 2012: KF-Bhaskar.ttf was released for a fee
- 2013: An offline version of Unicode to KF conversion tool was released
- 2013: The enhanced conversion tool to convert TO and FRO KF - UNICODE was made available
- 2018: 30 July: Created multiple packages including FREE version for different users need.
- 2018: 30 July: Released 11th font KF-Laxman in the JUMBO pack
- 2024: 27 February: Released economical version of Unicode conversion utilities

== See also ==
- Indic computing
- Kruti Dev
