= Kha (Devanagari) =

- ख

Usage
- Writing system: Devanagari script
- Type: Abugida
- Language of origin: Sanskrit
- Sound values: [kʰɐ]
- In Unicode: U+0916

Other
- Writing direction: Left-to-Right

Kha (ख) (खवर्ण khavarna) is the second consonant of the Devanagari abugida. It ultimately arose from the Brahmi letter 𑀔, after having gone through the Gupta letter. Letters that derive from it are the Gujarati letter ખ, and the Modi letter 𑘏.

== Devanagari-using languages ==
In all languages, ख is pronounced as [kʰə] or [kʰ] when appropriate.

- खण्ड = khand [kʰəɳɖ] "clause, fragment"

In this example, ख implements its inherent vowel, the schwa.

- अखरोट = akhrot [əkʰroːʈ] "nonsense"

In this example, ख deletes the inherent schwa for correct pronunciation.

Certain words that have been borrowed from Persian and Arabic implement the nukta to more properly approximate the original word. It is then transliterated as a x.

- ख़राब = xaraab [xaraːb] "bad"

=== Conjuncts with ख ===
- ख+य = व्याख्या, ख्याल, विख्यात।

== Mathematics ==
=== Āryabhaṭa numeration ===
Aryabhata used Devanagari letters for numbers, very similar to that of the Greeks, even after the invention of Indian numerals. The values of the different forms of ख are:

- ख [kʰə] = 2 (२)
- खि [kʰɪ] = 200 (२००)
- खु [kʰʊ] = 20,000 (२० ०००)
- खृ [kʰri] = 2,000,000 (२० ०० ०००)
- खॢ [kʰlə] = 2×10^{8} (२० ०० ०० ०००)
- खे [kʰe] = 2×10^{10} (२० ०० ०० ०० ०००)
- खै [kʰɛː] = 2×10^{12} (२० ०० ०० ०० ०० ०००)
- खो [kʰoː] = 2×10^{14} (२० ०० ०० ०० ०० ०० ०००)
- खौ [kʰɔː] = 2×10^{16} (२० ०० ०० ०० ०० ०० ०० ०००)
