= Devanagari Extended =

- Range: U+A8E0..U+A8FF (32 code points)
- Plane: BMP
- Scripts: Devanagari
- Symbol sets: Samaveda cantillation marks nasalization marks
- Assigned: 32 code points
- Unused: 0 reserved code points

Unicode Version History
- 5.2 (2009): 28 (+28)
- 8.0 (2015): 30 (+2)
- 11.0 (2018): 32 (+2)

Unicode documentation
- Code chart ∣ Web page

Devanagari Extended is a Unicode block containing cantillation marks for writing the Samaveda, and nasalization marks for the Devanagari script.

== Block ==
Devanagari Extended^{[1]} Official Unicode Consortium code chart (PDF)
	0	1	2	3	4	5	6	7	8	9	A	B	C	D	E	F
U+A8Ex	꣠	꣡	꣢	꣣	꣤	꣥	꣦	꣧	꣨	꣩	꣪	꣫	꣬	꣭	꣮	꣯
U+A8Fx	꣰	꣱	ꣲ	ꣳ	ꣴ	ꣵ	ꣶ	ꣷ	꣸	꣹	꣺	ꣻ	꣼	ꣽ	ꣾ	ꣿ
Notes 1.As of Unicode version 17.0

== History ==
The following Unicode-related documents record the purpose and process of defining specific characters in the Devanagari Extended block:

Version	Final code points (Note: Proposed code points and characters names may differ from final code points and names)	Count	L2 ID	WG2 ID	Document
5.2	U+A8E0..A8FB	28	L2/00-144		Everson, Michael (2000-04-22), Vedic Accents (untitled, undated early draft)
5.2	U+A8E0..A8FB	28	L2/00-178		Everson, Michael (2000-04-22), Encoding Vedic Accents
5.2	U+A8E0..A8FB	28	L2/00-155		Moore, Lisa (2000-05-31), Comments on Encoding Vedic Accents Proposal
5.2	U+A8E0..A8FB	28	L2/03-066		New Proposal for Vedic Characters and Symbols, 2003-02-26
5.2	U+A8E0..A8FB	28	L2/03-067		Joshi, R. K. (2003-02-27), Vedic Code Set; a draft
5.2	U+A8E0..A8FB	28	L2/03-102		Vikas, Om (2003-03-04), Unicode Standard for Indic Scripts
5.2	U+A8E0..A8FB	28	L2/03-101.2		Proposed Changes in Indic Scripts [Devanagari document], 2003-03-04
5.2	U+A8E0..A8FB	28	L2/04-398		Proposal to encode Vedic accents, etc., 2004-11-12
5.2	U+A8E0..A8FB	28	L2/05-063		Vikas, Om (2005-02-07), "Awaiting Updates-Devanagari", Issues in Representation of Indic Scripts in Unicode
5.2	U+A8E0..A8FB	28	L2/05-070		McGowan, Rick (2005-02-09), Indic ad hoc report
5.2	U+A8E0..A8FB	28	L2/05-026		Moore, Lisa (2005-05-16), "Scripts - Indic (C.12)", UTC #102 Minutes
5.2	U+A8E0..A8FB	28	L2/05-228		Muller, Eric (2005-08-11), Analysis of a TDIL proposal for Vedic
5.2	U+A8E0..A8FB	28	L2/06-185		Proposal for Encoding of Vedic Characters & Symbols in Unicode, 2006-05-10
5.2	U+A8E0..A8FB	28	L2/06-384		Lata, Swaran (2006-10-25), Letter from T. N. Dharmadhikari in support of Vedic repertoire
5.2	U+A8E0..A8FB	28	L2/07-060		Scharf, Peter (2007-02-02), Vedic Unicode Workshop Report
5.2	U+A8E0..A8FB	28	L2/07-095R	N3235R	Everson, Michael; Scharf, Peter; Angot, Michel; Chandrashekar, R.; Hyman, Malcolm; Rosenfield, Susan; Sastry, B. V. Venkatakrishna; Witzel, Michael (2007-04-13), Proposal to encode characters for Vedic Sanskrit in the BMP of the UCS
5.2	U+A8E0..A8FB	28	L2/07-230	N3290	Everson, Michael; Scharf, Peter; Angot, Michel; Chandrashekar, R.; Hyman, Malcolm; Rosenfield, Susan; Sastry, B. V. Venkatakrishna; Witzel, Michael (2007-07-26), Revised proposal to encode characters for Vedic Sanskrit in the BMP of the UCS
5.2	U+A8E0..A8FB	28	L2/07-254		Bhushan, E. K. Bharat (2007-08-01), Unicode for Vedic Sanskrit (letter to Mark Davis)
5.2	U+A8E0..A8FB	28	L2/07-262		Scharf, Peter (2007-08-07), Outline of the development of WG2/n3290 = L2/07-230
5.2	U+A8E0..A8FB	28	L2/07-271		Scharf, Peter (2007-08-08), Comparison of proposed characters in Lata 2006 (L2/06-185) with Scharf and Everson WG2/n3290 (L2/07-230)
5.2	U+A8E0..A8FB	28	L2/07-272		Muller, Eric (2007-08-10), "11", Report of the South Asia subcommittee
5.2	U+A8E0..A8FB	28	L2/07-396		Joshi, R. K.; Irani, Alka (2007-10-10), Proposal for Encoding of Vaidika Character and Symbols in Unicode
5.2	U+A8E0..A8FB	28	L2/07-386		Joshi, R. K. (2007-10-17), Comments on Comparison of proposed characters in Lata 2006 (L2/06-185) with Scharf and Everson WG2/n3290 (L2/07-230)
5.2	U+A8E0..A8FB	28	L2/07-388		Joshi, R. K. (2007-10-17), Following observations have been made with reference to the document No. L2/07-095 dated: 2007-04-13
5.2	U+A8E0..A8FB	28	L2/07-343	N3366	Everson, Michael; Scharf, Peter; Angot, Michel; Chandrashekar, R.; Hyman, Malcolm; Rosenfield, Susan; Sastry, B. V. Venkatakrishna; Witzel, Michael (2007-10-18), Proposal to encode 55 characters for Vedic Sanskrit in the BMP of the UCS
5.2	U+A8E0..A8FB	28	L2/07-394		Scharf, Peter (2007-10-18), Significant differences between L2/07-230 and L2/07-343
5.2	U+A8E0..A8FB	28	L2/07-395		Joshi, R. K.; et al. (2007-10-18), Request for feedback on draft proposal for encoding Vaidika characters and symbols in Unicode
5.2	U+A8E0..A8FB	28	L2/07-397		Joshi, R. K.; et al. (2007-10-18), Vaidika Vowels and Consonants
5.2	U+A8E0..A8FB	28	L2/07-400		Scharf, Peter (2007-10-18), Comments on R. K. Joshi's documents L2/07-386 and L2/07-388
5.2	U+A8E0..A8FB	28	L2/07-401		Scharf, Peter (2007-10-18), Equivalences between L2/07-396 and L2/07-343
5.2	U+A8E0..A8FB	28	L2/07-345		Moore, Lisa (2007-10-25), "Consensus 113-C19", UTC #113 Minutes
5.2	U+A8E0..A8FB	28	L2/08-035		Scharf, Peter; Rosenfield, Susan J. (2008-01-22), Vedic Revisions 2008 Jan 14, Revisions to N3366 = L2/07-343
5.2	U+A8E0..A8FB	28	L2/08-042		Joshi, R. K. (2008-01-23), Proposal for Encoding of Vaidika Characters & Symbols in Unicode
5.2	U+A8E0..A8FB	28	L2/08-043		Joshi, R. K. (2008-01-28), Vaidika Extensions A & B (Vedic evidence to accompany L2/08-042)
5.2	U+A8E0..A8FB	28	L2/08-092	N3385	Everson, Michael; Scharf, Peter (2008-01-31), Comparison between two Vedic proposals of January 2008
5.2	U+A8E0..A8FB	28	L2/08-097		Amendments to L2/08-042, L2/08-043, 2008-01-31
5.2	U+A8E0..A8FB	28	L2/08-050R	N3383R	Everson, Michael; Scharf, Peter (2008-03-06), Summary proposal to encode characters for Vedic in the BMP of the UCS
5.2	U+A8E0..A8FB	28	L2/08-096		Joshi, R. K. (2008-02-02), Comparison of L2/08-042 and L2/08-050
5.2	U+A8E0..A8FB	28	L2/08-110		Muller, Eric (2008-02-08), South Asia Subcommittee Report
5.2	U+A8E0..A8FB	28	L2/08-003		Moore, Lisa (2008-02-14), "Vedic", UTC #114 Minutes
5.2	U+A8E0..A8FB	28	L2/08-176	N3456R	Anderson, Deborah (2008-04-18), Summary of Vedic Characters based on N3385, N3383R, and the Unicode Pipeline
5.2	U+A8E0..A8FB	28	L2/08-196		Proposal for Encoding of Vaidika Sanskrit Characters & Symbols in the BMP of UCS, 2008-05-05
5.2	U+A8E0..A8FB	28	L2/08-216		Scharf, Peter (2008-05-08), Comments on L2/08-196 regarding the encoding of Sanskrit and Vedic
5.2	U+A8E0..A8FB	28	L2/08-294		Scharf, Peter (2008-08-06), Placement of characters in Vedic, Devanagari, and Devanagari Extended blocks
5.2	U+A8E0..A8FB	28	L2/08-317		Muller, Eric (2008-08-11), "1.2, 1.3", South Asia Subcommittee Report
5.2	U+A8E0..A8FB	28	L2/08-318	N3453 (pdf, doc)	Umamaheswaran, V. S. (2008-08-13), "M52.18", Unconfirmed minutes of WG 2 meeting 52
5.2	U+A8E0..A8FB	28	L2/08-253R2		Moore, Lisa (2008-08-19), "Vedic (B.15.2, E.1)", UTC #116 Minutes
5.2	U+A8E0..A8FB	28	L2/08-273R3	N3488R3	Everson, Michael; Scharf, Peter (2008-08-21), Proposal to encode two characters for Vedic in the UCS
5.2	U+A8E0..A8FB	28	L2/08-412	N3553 (pdf, doc)	Umamaheswaran, V. S. (2008-11-05), "M53.03", Unconfirmed minutes of WG 2 meeting 53
5.2	U+A8E0..A8FB	28	L2/09-067		Lata, Swaran (2009-01-28), Encoding of Vaidika Sanskrit Characters & Symbols in the BMP of UCS
8.0	U+A8FC	1	L2/12-147		Anderson, Deborah; McGowan, Rick; Whistler, Ken (2012-04-25), "VIII. DEVANAGARI", Review of Indic-related L2 documents and Recommendations to the UTC
8.0	U+A8FC	1	L2/12-123R	N4260	Pandey, Anshuman (2012-05-03), Proposal to Encode the Sign SIDDHAM for Devanagari
8.0	U+A8FC	1	L2/12-343R2		Moore, Lisa (2012-12-04), "Consensus 133-C13", UTC #133 Minutes
8.0	U+A8FC	1		N4353 (pdf, doc)	"M60.17", Unconfirmed minutes of WG 2 meeting 60, 2013-05-23
8.0	U+A8FD	1	L2/13-056	N4408	Pandey, Anshuman (2013-04-25), Proposal to Encode the Sign JAIN OM for Devanagari in ISO/IEC 10646
8.0	U+A8FD	1	L2/13-086		Anderson, Deborah; McGowan, Rick; Whistler, Ken; Pournader, Roozbeh (2013-04-26), "8", Recommendations to UTC on Script Proposals
8.0	U+A8FD	1	L2/13-058		Moore, Lisa (2013-06-12), "D.2", UTC #135 Minutes
8.0	U+A8FD	1		N4403 (pdf, doc)	Umamaheswaran, V. S. (2014-01-28), "10.3.9 Jain Om for Devanagar", Unconfirmed minutes of WG 2 meeting 61, Holiday Inn, Vilnius, Lithuania; 2013-06-10/14
11.0	U+A8FE..A8FF	2	L2/15-335		Pandey, Anshuman (2015-12-07), Proposal to encode the Devanagari letter and vowel sign AY
11.0	U+A8FE..A8FF	2	L2/16-037		Anderson, Deborah; Whistler, Ken; McGowan, Rick; Pournader, Roozbeh; Glass, Andrew; Iancu, Laurențiu (2016-01-22), "2. Devanagari", Recommendations to UTC #146 January 2016 on Script Proposals
11.0	U+A8FE..A8FF	2	L2/16-004		Moore, Lisa (2016-02-01), "D.7", UTC #146 Minutes

== See also ==
- Devanagari in Unicode
