= Kruti Dev =

Legacy non-Unicode Devanagari typeface

- Category: Sans-serif
- Classification: Non-Unicode Devanagari
- Date released: c. 1990s

Kruti Dev is a legacy non-Unicode Devanagari typeface used for Hindi text input in India, particularly during the 1990s and early 2000s. It belongs to a class of glyph-based fonts that encode Devanagari characters using non-standard ASCII-based mappings rather than Unicode-compliant encoding systems.

== History ==
Kruti Dev emerged during the desktop publishing (DTP) era in India, when Devanagari text entry depended on proprietary encodings and font-specific keyboard layouts. During this period, multiple incompatible encodings were in use, requiring users to install particular fonts to correctly view or edit documents.

Such fonts were commonly used with desktop publishing software, including early versions of PageMaker and CorelDRAW, which had limited support for complex script rendering.

== Technical characteristics ==
Kruti Dev does not use standardized Unicode encoding. Instead, it maps Devanagari glyphs onto ASCII character positions, a method widely used in legacy Indian language fonts.

As a result:

- Text requires the specific font file to render correctly
- Copying or sharing text without the font may produce unreadable output
- Text processing, searching, and indexing are limited in modern systems

Research notes that many such legacy fonts exist and require conversion into Unicode for interoperability.

== Usage ==
Kruti Dev has been used in government offices, printing workflows, and typing practices in India. Some public service recruitment processes have historically specified legacy Hindi fonts for typing proficiency.

Its continued use is associated with large archives of legacy documents and established typing practices.

== Unicode conversion ==
Because Kruti Dev uses a legacy encoding scheme, text written in the font may not display correctly on systems where the font is not installed. Conversion tools are therefore used to transform such text into Unicode Devanagari, enabling compatibility across modern platforms.

== Transition to Unicode ==
With the adoption of Unicode as the standard for multilingual text encoding, the use of legacy fonts such as Kruti Dev has declined. Unicode provides consistent representation of Devanagari text across devices and applications.

Conversion from legacy encodings remains necessary for digitizing older documents and integrating them into modern systems.

== Legacy and impact ==
Kruti Dev is representative of pre-Unicode Hindi fonts that played a role in early digital publishing in India. Its continued presence reflects the broader transition from proprietary encoding systems to standardized text technologies.

== See also ==
- Unicode
- Devanagari
- Hindi typography
- Mangal (typeface)
- InScript keyboard
