= Laghava =

॰

Laghava
- U+0970 ॰ DEVANAGARI ABBREVIATION SIGN

The laghava ( ॰; from the Sanskrit: लाघव चिह्न, romanized: lāghava cihna, lit. 'brevity sign', IPA: [laːɡʰɐʋɐ]) is the Devanagari abbreviation sign, comparable to the full stop or ellipsis as used in the Latin alphabet. It is encoded in Unicode at U+0970 ॰ DEVANAGARI ABBREVIATION SIGN.

It is used as abbreviation sign in Hindi and other Devanagari-script-based languages. For example, "Dr." is written as "डॉ॰", "M.Sc." as "एम॰एससी॰", etc.

== See also ==
- 。: CJK full stop
- ° : degree symbol
