= Devanagari =

Indic script used in the Indian subcontinent

Devanāgarī देवनागरी
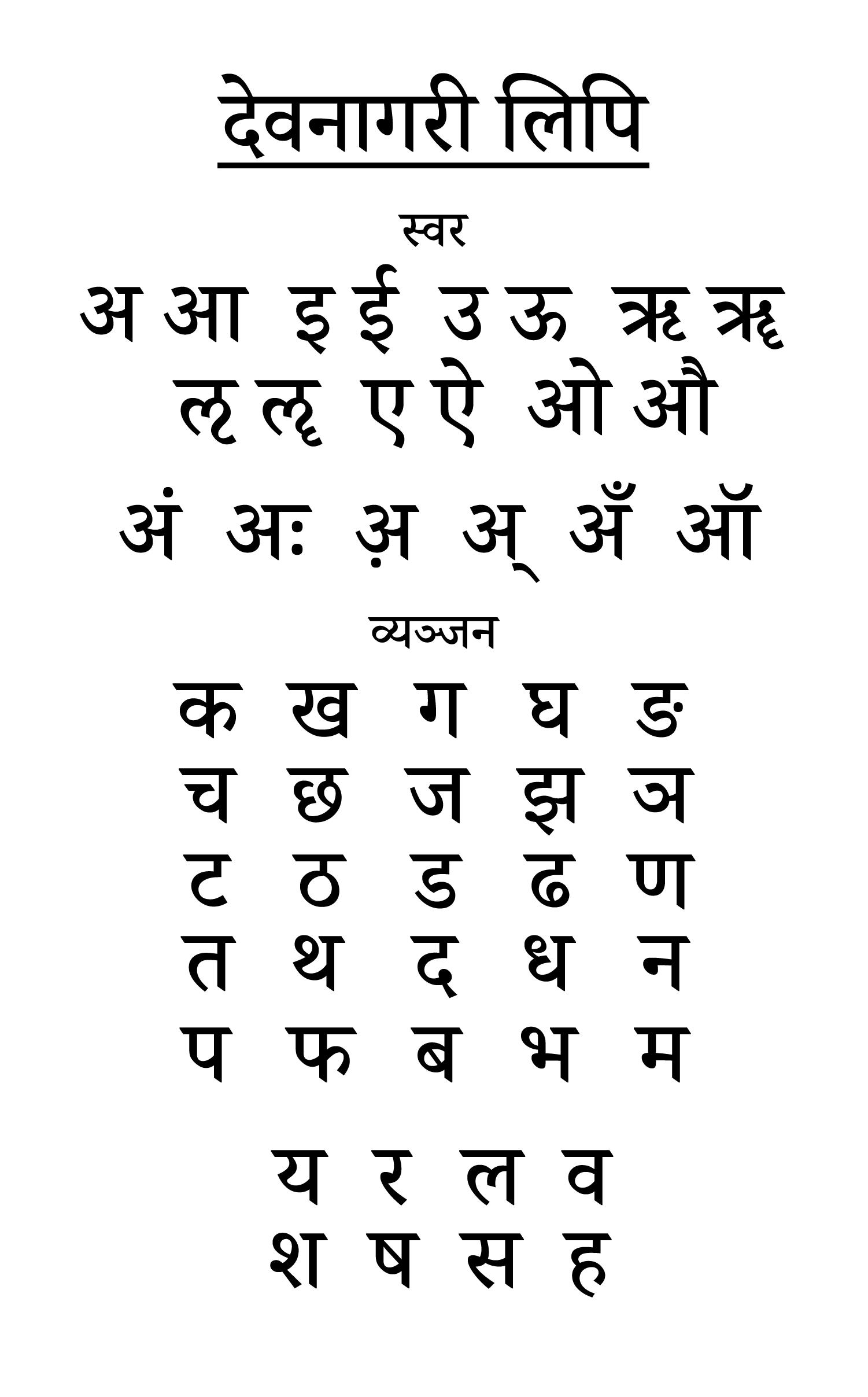
- Devanāgarī script (vowels top three rows, consonants below)
- Script type: Abugida
- Period: 11th century to present
- Direction: Left-to-right
- Official script: India; Nepal; Fiji
- Languages: Apabhramsha, Angika, Awadhi, Bajjika, Bhili, Bhojpuri, Boro, Braj, Chhattisgarhi, Dogri, Fiji Hindi, Garhwali, Haryanvi, Hindi, Kashmiri, Khandeshi, Konkani, Kumaoni, Magahi, Maithili, Marathi, Marwari, Mundari, Nagpuri, Newari, Nepali, Pali, Pahari, Prakrit, Rajasthani, Sanskrit, Santali, Saraiki, Sarnami, Sherpa, Shina, Sindhi, Surjapuri, etc.

Related scripts
- Parent systems: Egyptian hieroglyphs: Proto-Sinaitic (Note: A Semitic origin for the Brāhmī script is not universally accepted.); Phoenician; Aramaic (disputed); Brāhmī; Gupta; Siddhaṃ; Nāgarī; Devanāgarī
- Sister systems: Nandināgarī; Kaithī; Gujarātī; Mōḍī

ISO 15924
- ISO 15924: Deva (315), Devanagari (Nagari)

Unicode
- Unicode alias: Devanagari
- Unicode range: U+0900–U+097F Devanagari, U+A8E0–U+A8FF Devanagari Extended, U+11B00–11B5F Devanagari Extended-A, U+1CD0–U+1CFF Vedic Extensions

Devanagari (/ˌdeɪvəˈnɑːɡəri/ DAY-və-NAH-gə-ree; in script: देवनागरी, IAST: Devanāgarī, Sanskrit pronunciation: [deːʋɐnaːɡɐriː]) is an Indic script used in the Indian subcontinent. Also simply called Nāgarī (Sanskrit: नागरी, Nāgarī), it is a left-to-right abugida (a type of segmental writing system), based on the ancient Brāhmī script. It is one of the official scripts of India and Nepal. It was developed and in regular use by the 8th century CE. It had achieved its modern form by 1000 CE. The Devanāgarī script, composed of 48 primary characters, including 14 vowels and 34 consonants, is the fourth most widely adopted writing system in the world, being used for over 120 languages, the most popular of which is Hindi. It has long been used traditionally by religiously educated people in South Asia to record and transmit information, existing throughout the land in parallel with a wide variety of local scripts (such as Moḍī, Kaithi, and Mahajani) used for administration, commerce, and other daily uses.

The orthography of this script reflects the pronunciation of the language. Unlike the Latin alphabet, the script has no concept of letter case, meaning the script is a unicameral alphabet. It is written from left to right, has a strong preference for symmetrical, rounded shapes within squared outlines, and is recognisable by a horizontal line, known as a शिरोरेखा śirorekhā, that runs along the top of full letters. In a cursory look, the Devanāgarī script appears different from other Indic scripts, such as Bengali-Assamese or Gurmukhi, but a closer examination reveals they are very similar, except for angles and structural emphasis.

Among the languages using it as a primary or secondary script are Marathi, Pāḷi, Sanskrit, Hindi, Boro, Nepali, Sherpa, Prakrit, Apabhramsha, Awadhi, Bhojpuri, Braj Bhasha, Chhattisgarhi, Haryanvi, Magahi, Nagpuri, Rajasthani, Khandeshi, Bhili, Dogri, Kashmiri, Shina, Maithili, Konkani, Sindhi, Saraiki, Nepal Bhasa, Mundari, Angika, Bajjika and Santali. The Devanāgarī script is closely related to the Nandināgarī script commonly found in numerous ancient manuscripts of South India, and it is distantly related to a number of Southeast Asian scripts.

== Etymology ==
Devanāgarī is formed by combining the word deva (देव) with nāgarī (नागरी). Nāgarī is an adjective derived from nagara (नगर), a Sanskrit word meaning "town" or "city", and literally means "urban" or "urbane".

The word Nāgarī (implicitly modifying lipi (लिपि), meaning "script") was used independently to refer to a North Indian script, or possibly a group of such scripts, as attested by Al-Biruni in the 11th century. The form Devanāgarī is attested later, at least by the 18th century.

The name of the Nandināgarī script is also formed by adding a prefix to the generic script name nāgarī. The precise significance of the prefix deva- ("heavenly" or "god") remains unclear.

== History ==
Devanāgarī is part of the Brahmic family of scripts of India, Nepal, Tibet, and Southeast Asia. It is a descendant of the 3rd century BCE Brāhmī script, which evolved into the Nagari script which in turn gave birth to Devanāgarī and Nandināgarī.

Medieval inscriptions suggest widespread diffusion of Nāgarī-related scripts, with biscripts presenting local script along with the adoption of Nāgarī scripts. For example, the mid-8th-century Pattadakal pillar in Karnataka has text in both Siddha Matrika script, and an early Telugu-Kannada script; while the Kangra Jawalamukhi inscription in Himachal Pradesh is written in both Sharada and Devanāgarī scripts.

The Nāgarī script was in regular use by the 7th century CE, and it was fully developed by about the end of first millennium. The use of Sanskrit in Nāgarī script in medieval India is attested by numerous pillar and cave-temple inscriptions, including the 11th-century Udayagiri inscriptions in Madhya Pradesh, and an inscribed brick found in Uttar Pradesh, dated to be from 1217 CE, which is now held at the British Museum. Nāgarī has been the primus inter pares of the Indic scripts. In northern and central India, Nāgarī became increasingly associated with Sanskrit and eventually with a number of regional languages. The form subsequently known as Devanāgarī became the principal standardized form of the Nagari tradition. Salomon places the development of standardized Devanāgarī around the end of the first millennium, while noting that regional and chronological variation continued.

Evolution of the Brahmi script
	k-	kh-	g-	gh-	ṅ-	c-	ch-	j-	jh-	ñ-	ṭ-	ṭh-	ḍ-	ḍh-	ṇ-	t-	th-	d-	dh-	n-	p-	ph-	b-	bh-	m-	y-	r-	l-	v-	ś-	ṣ-	s-	h-
Early Brahmi	𑀓	𑀔	𑀕	𑀖	𑀗	𑀘	𑀙	𑀚	𑀛	𑀜	𑀝	𑀞	𑀟	𑀠	𑀡	𑀢	𑀣	𑀤	𑀥	𑀦	𑀧	𑀨	𑀩	𑀪	𑀫	𑀬	𑀭	𑀮	𑀯	𑀰	𑀱	𑀲	𑀳
Middle Brahmi																																	
Late Brahmi																																	
Devanagari	क	ख	ग	घ	ङ	च	छ	ज	झ	ञ	ट	ठ	ड	ढ	ण	त	थ	द	ध	न	प	फ	ब	भ	म	य	र	ल	व	श	ष	स	ह

One of the oldest surviving Sanskrit texts from the early post-Maurya period consists of 1,413 Nāgarī pages of a commentary by Patanjali, with a composition date of about 150 BCE, the surviving copy transcribed about 14th century CE. In Sinja Valley, mid-western Nepal where the Nepali language originates from, the earliest examples of the Devanagari script from the 13th century were found on the cliffs and in nearby Dullu.

Devanāgarī has been widely adopted across India and Nepal to write Sanskrit, Marathi, Hindi, Central Indo-Aryan languages, Konkani, Boro, and various Nepalese languages.

Examples of Devanāgarī manuscripts created between the 18th and 19th centuries
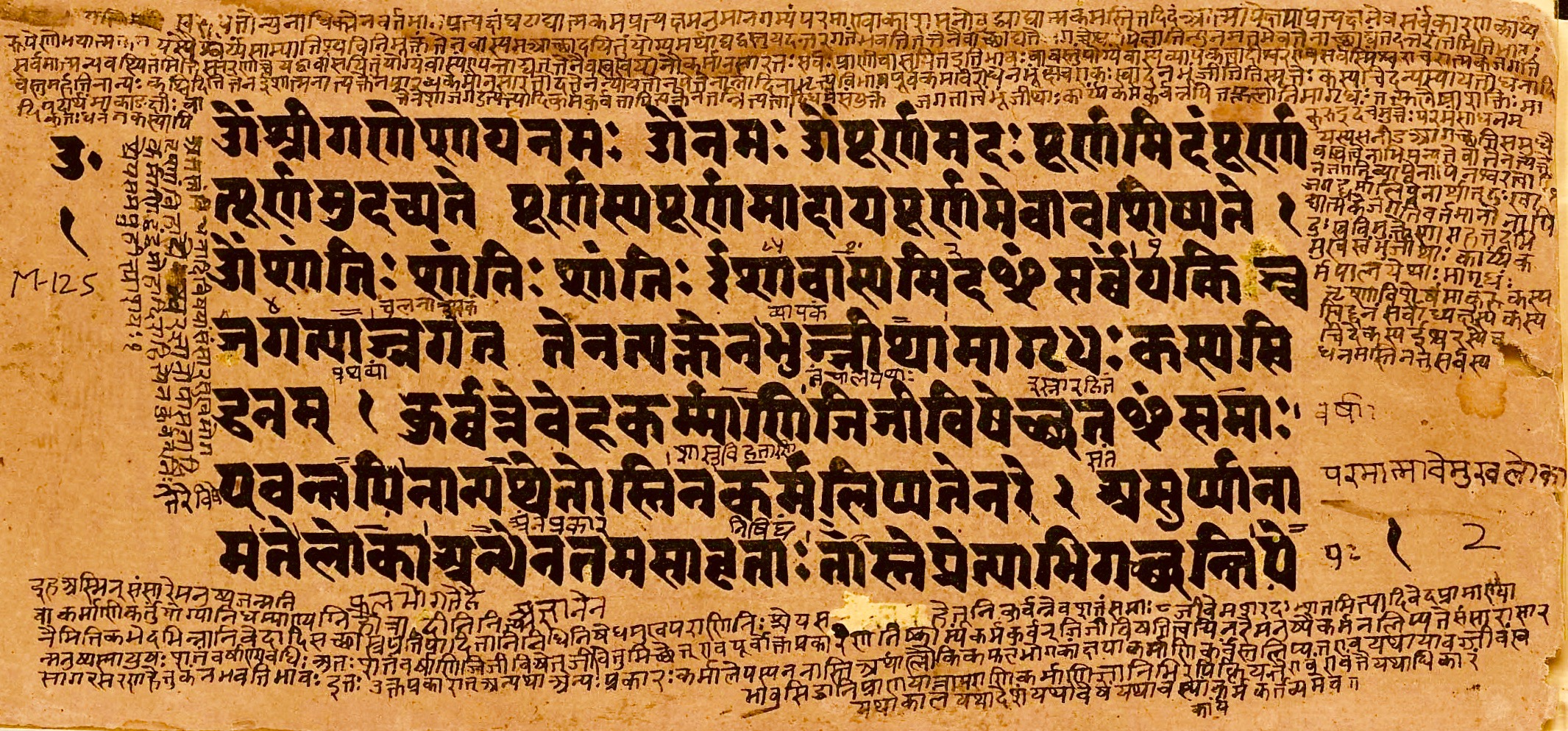

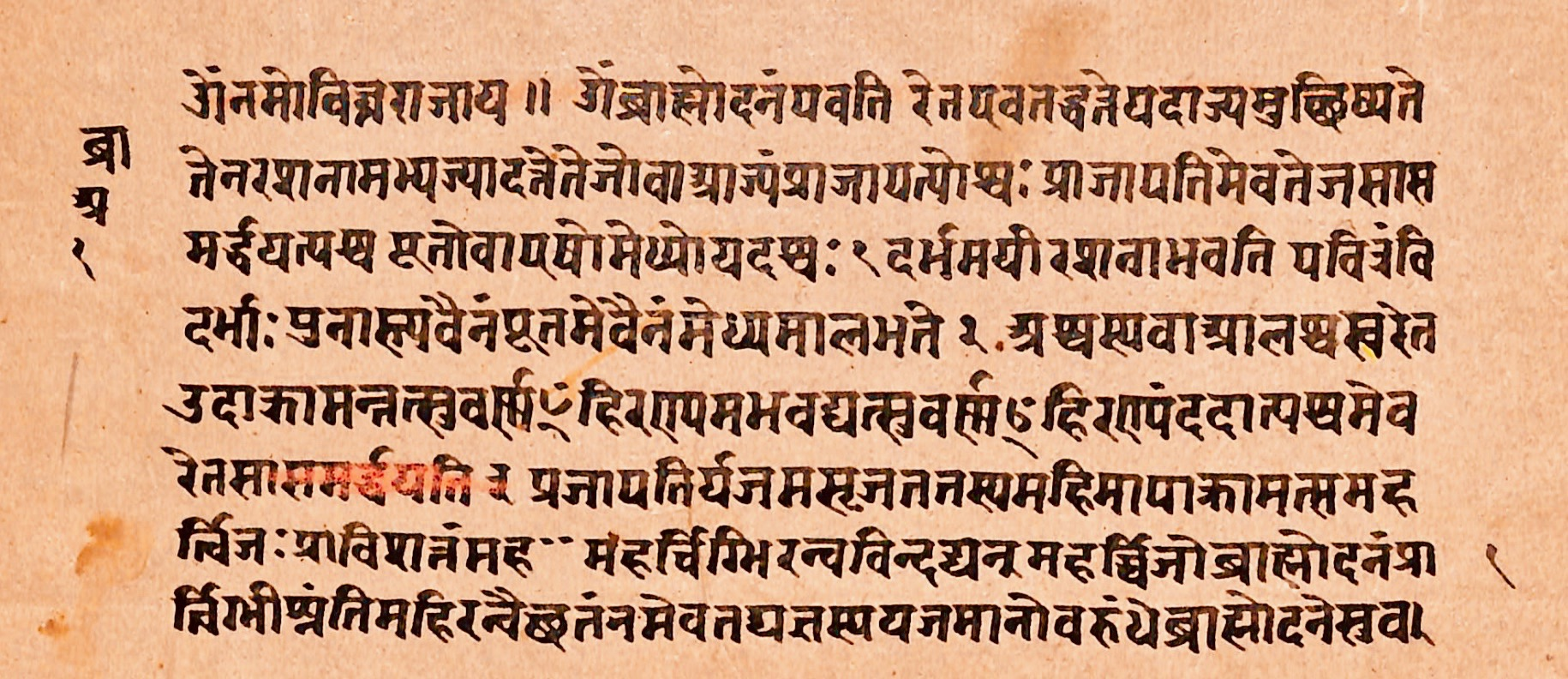

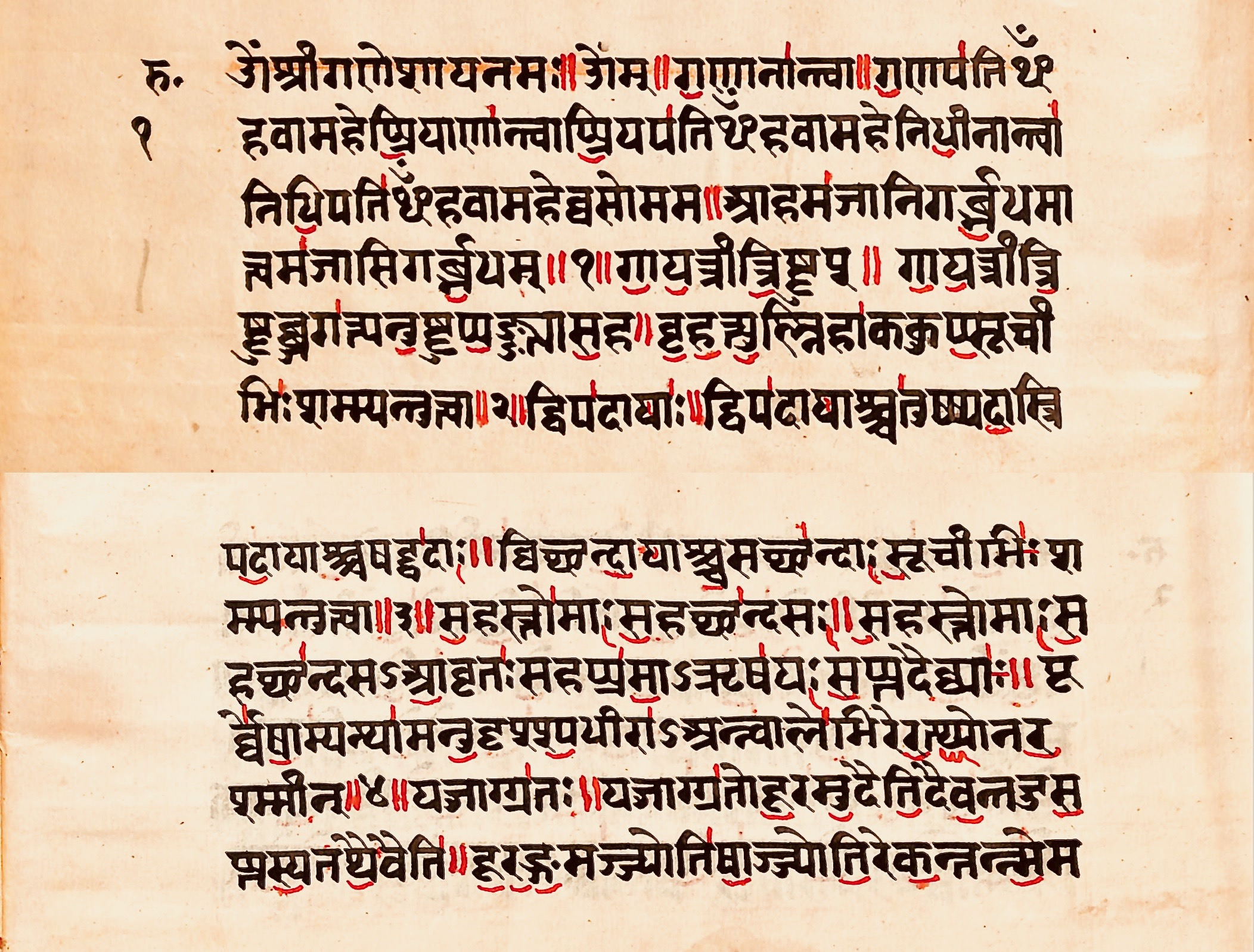

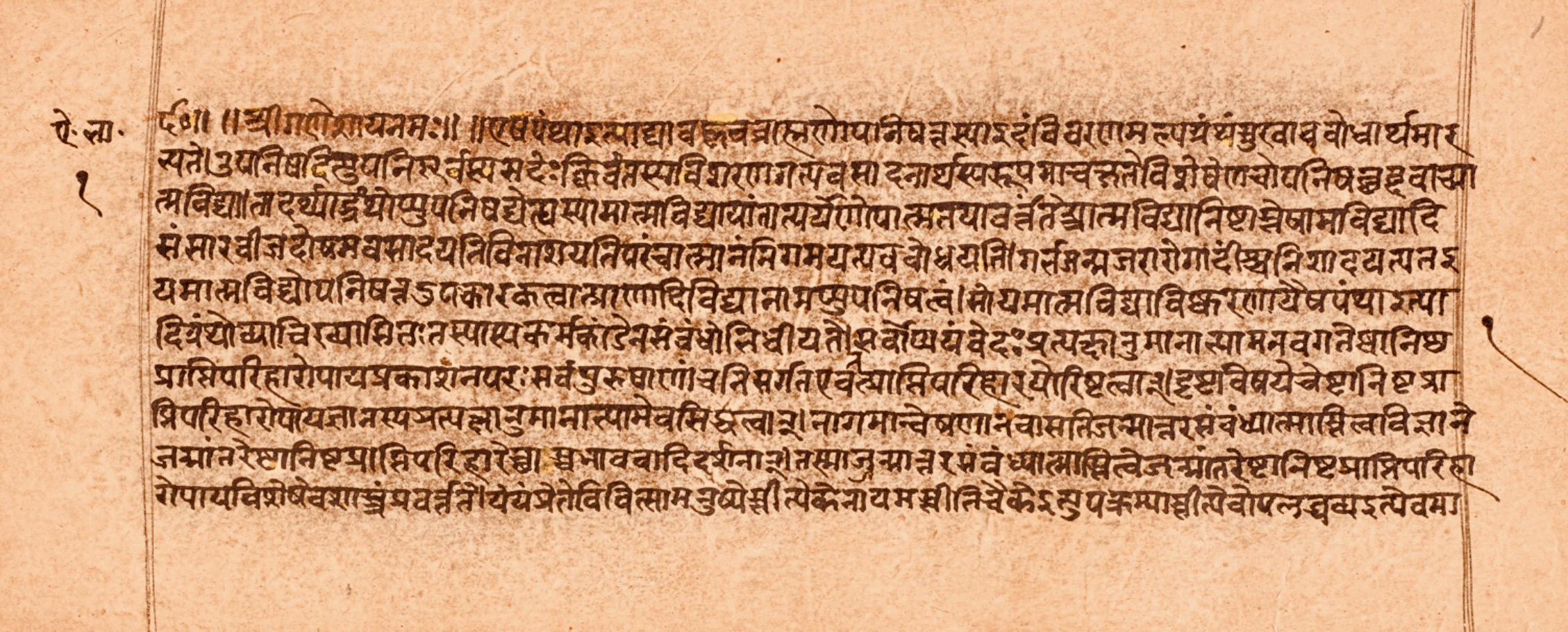

== Letters ==
The letter order of Devanāgarī, like nearly all Brāhmic scripts, is based on phonetic principles that consider both the manner and place of articulation of the consonants and vowels they represent. This arrangement is usually referred to as the varṇamālā ("garland of letters"). The format of Devanāgarī for Sanskrit serves as the prototype for its application, with minor variations or additions, to other languages.

The vowels and their arrangement are:

	Independent form	IAST	ISO	IPA	As diacritic with प (Barakhadi)	Independent form	IAST	ISO	IPA	As diacritic with प (Barakhadi)
kaṇṭhya (Velar)	अ	a		[ɐ]	प	आ	ā		[aː]	पा
tālavya (Palatal)	इ	i		[i]	पि	ई	ī		[iː]	पी
oṣṭhya (Labial)	उ	u		[u]	पु ^{8}	ऊ	ū		[uː]	पू ^{8}
mūrdhanya (Retroflex)	ऋ ^{5,} ^{8}	ṛ	r̥	[r̩]	पृ	ॠ ^{6}	ṝ	r̥̄	[r̩ː]	पॄ
dantya (Dental)	ऌ ^{6}	ḷ	l̥	[l̩]	पॢ	ॡ ^{6,} ^{7}	ḹ	l̥̄	[l̩ː]	पॣ
kaṇṭhatālavya (Palatovelar)	ए	e	ē	[eː]	पे	ऐ	ai		[aːɪ] (in Hindi: [ɛː])	पै
kaṇṭhoṣṭhya (Labiovelar)	ओ	o	ō	[oː]	पो	औ	au		[aːʊ] (in Hindi: [ɔː])	पौ
	अं / ं ^{1,2}	ṃ		[◌̃]	पं	अः / ः ^{1}	ḥ		[h]	पः

1. Arranged with the vowels are two consonantal diacritics, the final nasal anusvāra ं ṃ and the final fricative visarga ः ḥ (called अं aṃ and अः aḥ). Masica (1991:146) notes of the anusvāra in Sanskrit that "there is some controversy as to whether it represents a homorganic nasal stop ..., a nasalised vowel, a nasalised semivowel, or all these according to context". The visarga represents post-vocalic voiceless glottal fricative [h], in Sanskrit an allophone of s, or less commonly r, usually in word-final position. Some traditions of recitation append an echo of the vowel after the breath: इः [ihi]. Masica (1991:146) considers the visarga along with letters ङ ṅa and ञ ña for the "largely predictable" velar and palatal nasals to be examples of "phonetic overkill in the system".
2. Another diacritic is the candrabindu/anunāsika ँ अँ. Salomon (2003:76–77) describes it as a "more emphatic form" of the anusvāra, "sometimes ... used to mark a true [vowel] nasalization". In a new Indo-Aryan language such as Hindi the distinction is formal: the candrabindu indicates vowel nasalisation while the anusvār indicates a homorganic nasal preceding another consonant: e.g., हँसी [ɦə̃si] "laughter", गंगा [ɡəŋɡɑ] "the Ganges". When an akṣara has a vowel diacritic above the top line, that leaves no room for the candra ("moon") stroke candrabindu, which is dispensed with in favour of the lone dot: हूँ [ɦũ] "am", but हैं [ɦɛ̃] "are". Some writers and typesetters dispense with the "moon" stroke altogether, using only the dot in all situations.
3. The virāma or halanta diacritic ् expresses the absence of a vowel after the consonant, e.g. क्‌ष can represent kṣa.
4. The avagraha (ऽ अऽ) (usually transliterated with an apostrophe) is a Sanskrit punctuation mark for the elision of a vowel in sandhi: एकोऽयम् eko'yam ( ← एकस् ekas + अयम् ayam) ("this one"). An original long vowel lost to coalescence is sometimes marked with a double avagraha: सदाऽऽत्मा sadā'tmā ( ← सदा sadā + आत्मा ātmā) "always, the self". In Hindi, Snell (2000:77) states that its "main function is to show that a vowel is sustained in a cry or a shout": आईऽऽऽ! āīīī!. In Madhyadeshi languages like Bhojpuri, Awadhi, Maithili, etc. which have "quite a number of verbal forms that end in that inherent vowel", the avagraha is used to mark the non-elision of word-final inherent a, which otherwise is a modern orthographic convention: बइठऽ baiṭha "sit" versus बइठ baiṭh
5. The sound represented by ऋ ṛ has largely been lost in the modern languages, and its pronunciation now ranges from [ɾɪ] (Hindi) to [ɾu] (Marathi).
6. The syllabic consonants ॠ ṝ, ऌ ḷ, and ॡ ḹ are specific to Sanskrit and not included in the varṇamālā of other languages.
7. ḹ is not an actual phoneme of Sanskrit, but rather a graphic convention included among the vowels in order to maintain the symmetry of short–long pairs of letters.
8. There are non-regular formations of रु ru, रू rū, and हृ hṛ.
9. There are two more vowels in Marathi, ॲ and ऑ, that respectively represent [æ], similar to the RP English pronunciation of ⟨a⟩ in act, and [ɒ], similar to the RP pronunciation of ⟨o⟩ in cot. These vowels are sometimes used in Hindi too, as in डॉलर dôlar ("dollar"). IAST transliteration is not defined. In ISO 15919, the transliteration is ê and ô, respectively.
10. Kashmiri Devanagari uses letters like ॳ, ॴ, ॶ, ॷ, ऎ, ऒ, औ, ॵ to represent its vowels (see Kashmiri language#Devanagari).

=== Consonants ===
The table below shows the consonant letters (in combination with inherent vowel a) and their arrangement. To the right of the Devanāgarī letter it shows the Latin script transliteration using International Alphabet of Sanskrit Transliteration, and the phonetic value (IPA) in Hindi.

Phonetics →	sparśa (Occlusive)								anunāsika (Nasal)		antastha (Approximant)		ūṣman/saṃgharṣī (Fricative)			
Voicing →	aghoṣa				saghoṣa								aghoṣa		saghoṣa	
Aspiration →	alpaprāṇa		mahāprāṇa		alpaprāṇa		mahāprāṇa		alpaprāṇa				mahāprāṇa			
kaṇṭhya (Velar)	क	ka [k]	ख	kha [kʰ]	ग	ga [ɡ]	घ	gha [ɡʱ]	ङ	ṅa [ŋ]					ह	ha [ɦ]
tālavya (Palatal)	च	ca [tʃ]	छ	cha [tʃʰ]	ज	ja [dʒ]	झ	jha [dʒʱ]	ञ	ña [ɲ]	य	ya [j]	श	śa [ʃ]		
mūrdhanya (Retroflex)	ट	ṭa [ʈ]	ठ	ṭha [ʈʰ]	ड	ḍa [ɖ]	ढ	ḍha [ɖʱ]	ण	ṇa [ɳ]	र	ra [r]	ष	ṣa [ʂ]		
dantya (Dental)	त	ta [t̪]	थ	tha [t̪ʰ]	द	da [d̪]	ध	dha [d̪ʱ]	न	na [n]	ल	la [l]	स	sa [s]		
oṣṭhya (Labial)	प	pa [p]	फ	pha [pʰ]	ब	ba [b]	भ	bha [bʱ]	म	ma [m]	व	va [ʋ]				

- Additionally, there is ळ ḷa (IPA: [ɭ] or [ɭ̆]), the intervocalic lateral flap allophone of the voiced retroflex stop in Vedic Sanskrit, which is a phoneme in languages such as Marathi, Konkani, Garhwali, and Rajasthani.
- Beyond the Sanskritic set, new shapes have rarely been formulated. Masica (1991:146) offers the following: "In any case, according to some, all possible sounds had already been described and provided for in this system, as Sanskrit was the original and perfect language. Hence it was difficult to provide for or even to conceive other sounds, unknown to the phoneticians of Sanskrit (The phoneticians did describe certain sounds qua sounds — bilabial fricatives, for instance — which, being either sporadic or completely predictable, were never represented in the writing system.)". Where foreign borrowings and internal developments did inevitably accrue and arise in New Indo-Aryan languages, they have been ignored in writing or dealt with through means such as diacritics and ligatures (ignored in recitation).
  - The most prolific diacritic has been the subscript dot (nuqtā) ़. Hindi uses it for the Persian, Arabic and English sounds क़ qa /q/, ख़ xa /x/, ग़ ġa /ɣ/, ज़ za /z/, झ़ zha /ʒ/, and फ़ fa /f/, and for the allophonic developments ड़ ṛa /ɽ/ and ढ़ ṛha /ɽʱ/. (Although ऴ ḻa /ɻ/ could also exist, it is not used in Hindi.)
  - Devanagari used to write Mahl dialect of Dhivehi uses nukta on च़, त़, द़, ल़, श़, स़, ह़ to represent other Perso-Arabic phonemes (see Maldivian writing systems#Devanagari script for Mahl).
  - Sindhi's and Saraiki's implosives are accommodated with a line attached below: ॻ [ɠə], ॼ [ʄə], ॾ [ɗə], ॿ [ɓə].
  - Aspirated sonorants may be represented as conjuncts/ligatures with ह ha: म्ह mha, न्ह nha, ण्ह ṇha, व्ह vha, ल्ह lha, ळ्ह ḷha, र्ह rha.
  - Masica (1991:147) notes Marwari as using ॸ for ḍa [ɗə] (while ड represents [ɽə]).
  - When used to write Avestan, Devanagari uses letters like ॹ /ʒ/ to represent its sounds.

=== Vowel diacritics ===
क (ka) modified by dependent vowels marks (mātrā) and diacritics, namely the anusvāra, visarga, halanta, and nuqtā

The table below shows the syllabic letter क (ka) modified by common dependent vowel marks and diacritics, with the ISO 15919 transliterations for each combination. Vowels in their independent form (without a consonant) are on the top, and in their corresponding dependent form (vowel diacritic) combined with the consonant 'k' on the bottom. The table begins with 'ka' without any added vowel mark, where the vowel 'a' is inherent.

a	ā	i	ī	u	ū	r̥	r̥̄	l̥	l̥̄	e	ê	ē	ai	o	ô	ō	au	ṃ	m̐	ḥ		
अ	आ	इ	ई	उ	ऊ	ऋ	ॠ	ऌ	ॡ	ऄ ऎ	ॲ ऍ	ए	ऐ	ऒ	ऑ	ओ	औ	अं	अँ	अः		
	ा	ि	ी	ु	ू	ृ	ॄ	ॢ	ॣ	ॆ	ॅ	े	ै	ॊ	ॉ	ो	ौ	ं	ँ	ः	्	़
ka	kā	ki	kī	ku	kū	kr̥	kr̥̄	kl̥	kl̥̄	ke	kê	kē	kai	ko	kô	kō	kau	kaṃ	kam̐	kaḥ	k	qa
क	का	कि	की	कु	कू	कृ	कॄ	कॢ	कॣ	कॆ	कॅ	के	कै	कॊ	कॉ	को	कौ	कं	कँ	कः	क्	क़

A vowel combines with a consonant in their diacritic form. For example, the vowel ऊ (ū) combines with the consonant छ् (ch) to form the syllabic letter छू (chū), with halanta (cancel sign) removed and added vowel sign which is indicated by diacritics. The vowel अ (a) combines with the consonant छ् (ch) to form छ (cha) with halanta removed. But the diacritic series of च, छ, ज, झ (ca, cha, ja, jha, respectively) is without any added vowel sign, as the vowel अ (a) is inherent.

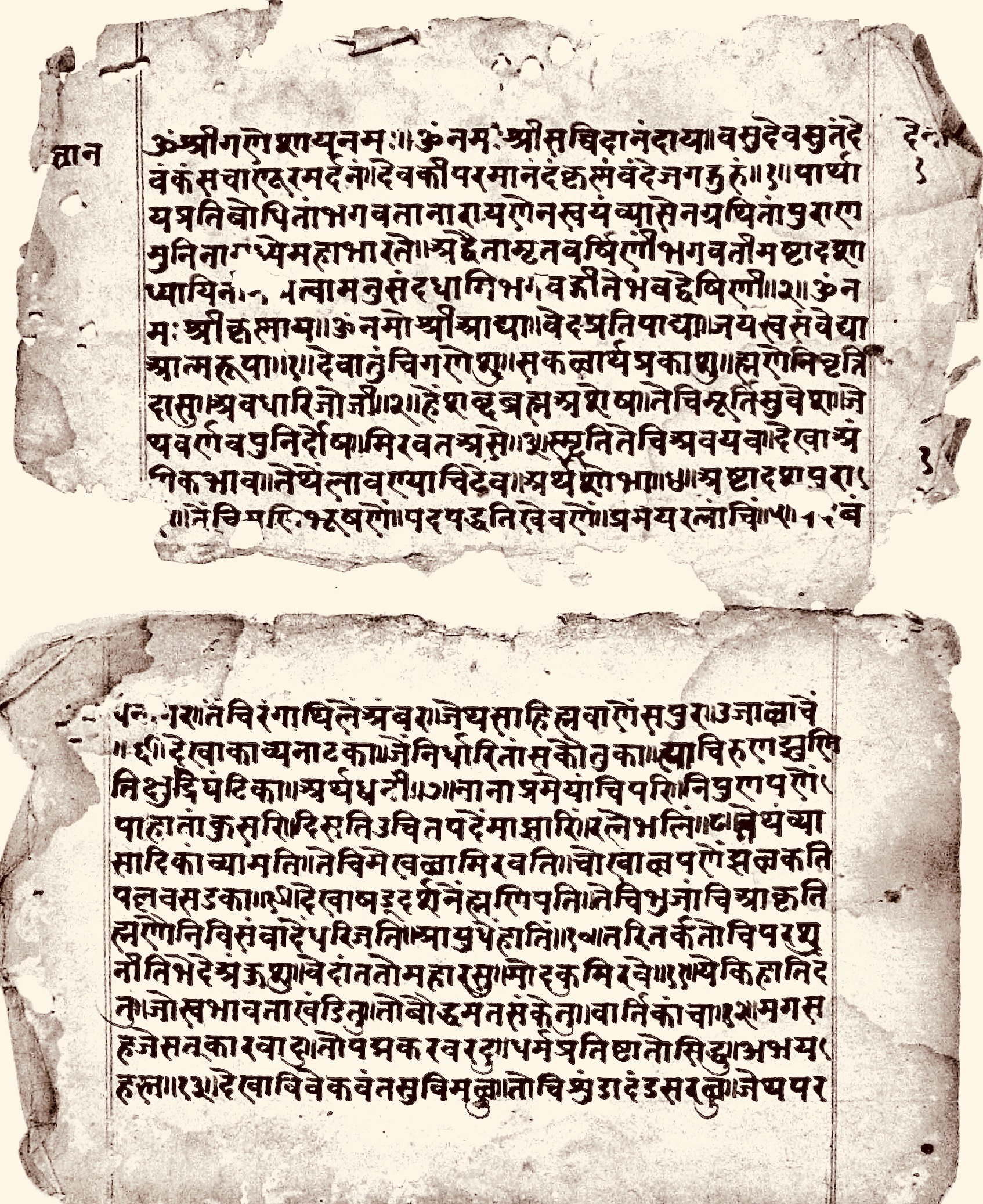
The Jñānēśvarī is a commentary on the Bhagavad Gita, dated to 1290 CE. It is in written in Marathi using the Devanāgarī script.

=== Barakhadi ===
The combinations of all Sanskrit consonants and vowels, each in alphabetical order, are laid out in the bārākhaḍī (बाराखडी) or bārahkhaṛī (बारहखड़ी) table. In the following barakhadi table, the IAST transliteration of each combination will appear on mouseover:

Barakhadi table
	a	ā	i	ī	u	ū	ṛ	ṝ	ḷ	ḹ	e	ai	o	au	aṃ	am̐	aḥ
	अ	आ	इ	ई	उ	ऊ	ऋ	ॠ	ऌ	ॡ	ए	ऐ	ओ	औ	अं	अँ	अः
k-	क	का	कि	की	कु	कू	कृ	कॄ	कॢ	कॣ	के	कै	को	कौ	कं	कँ	कः
kh-	ख	खा	खि	खी	खु	खू	खृ	खॄ	खॢ	खॣ	खे	खै	खो	खौ	खं	खँ	खः
g-	ग	गा	गि	गी	गु	गू	गृ	गॄ	गॢ	गॣ	गे	गै	गो	गौ	गं	गँ	गः
gh-	घ	घा	घि	घी	घु	घू	घृ	घॄ	घॢ	घॣ	घे	घै	घो	घौ	घं	घँ	घः
ṅ-	ङ	ङा	ङि	ङी	ङु	ङू	ङृ	ङॄ	ङॢ	ङॣ	ङे	ङै	ङो	ङौ	ङं	ङँ	ङः
c-	च	चा	चि	ची	चु	चू	चृ	चॄ	चॢ	चॣ	चे	चै	चो	चौ	चं	चँ	चः
ch-	छ	छा	छि	छी	छु	छू	छृ	छॄ	छॢ	छॣ	छे	छै	छो	छौ	छं	छँ	छः
j-	ज	जा	जि	जी	जु	जू	जृ	जॄ	जॢ	जॣ	जे	जै	जो	जौ	जं	जँ	जः
jh-	झ	झा	झि	झी	झु	झू	झृ	झॄ	झॢ	झॣ	झे	झै	झो	झौ	झं	झँ	झः
ñ-	ञ	ञा	ञि	ञी	ञु	ञू	ञृ	ञॄ	ञॢ	ञॣ	ञे	ञै	ञो	ञौ	ञं	ञँ	ञः
ṭ-	ट	टा	टि	टी	टु	टू	टृ	टॄ	टॢ	टॣ	टे	टै	टो	टौ	टं	टँ	टः
ṭh-	ठ	ठा	ठि	ठी	ठु	ठू	ठृ	ठॄ	ठॢ	ठॣ	ठे	ठै	ठो	ठौ	ठं	ठँ	ठः
ḍ-	ड	डा	डि	डी	डु	डू	डृ	डॄ	डॢ	डॣ	डे	डै	डो	डौ	डं	डँ	डः
ḍh-	ढ	ढा	ढि	ढी	ढु	ढू	ढृ	ढॄ	ढॢ	ढॣ	ढे	ढै	ढो	ढौ	ढं	ढँ	ढः
ṇ-	ण	णा	णि	णी	णु	णू	णृ	णॄ	णॢ	णॣ	णे	णै	णो	णौ	णं	णँ	णः
t-	त	ता	ति	ती	तु	तू	तृ	तॄ	तॢ	तॣ	ते	तै	तो	तौ	तं	तँ	तः
th-	थ	था	थि	थी	थु	थू	थृ	थॄ	थॢ	थॣ	थे	थै	थो	थौ	थं	थँ	थः
d-	द	दा	दि	दी	दु	दू	दृ	दॄ	दॢ	दॣ	दे	दै	दो	दौ	दं	दँ	दः
dh-	ध	धा	धि	धी	धु	धू	धृ	धॄ	धॢ	धॣ	धे	धै	धो	धौ	धं	धँ	धः
n-	न	ना	नि	नी	नु	नू	नृ	नॄ	नॢ	नॣ	ने	नै	नो	नौ	नं	नँ	नः
p-	प	पा	पि	पी	पु	पू	पृ	पॄ	पॢ	पॣ	पे	पै	पो	पौ	पं	पँ	पः
ph-	फ	फा	फि	फी	फु	फू	फृ	फॄ	फॢ	फॣ	फे	फै	फो	फौ	फं	फँ	फः
b-	ब	बा	बि	बी	बु	बू	बृ	बॄ	बॢ	बॣ	बे	बै	बो	बौ	बं	बँ	बः
bh-	भ	भा	भि	भी	भु	भू	भृ	भॄ	भॢ	भॣ	भे	भै	भो	भौ	भं	भँ	भः
m-	म	मा	मि	मी	मु	मू	मृ	मॄ	मॢ	मॣ	मे	मै	मो	मौ	मं	मँ	मः
y-	य	या	यि	यी	यु	यू	यृ	यॄ	यॢ	यॣ	ये	यै	यो	यौ	यं	यँ	यः
r-	र	रा	रि	री	रु	रू	रृ	रॄ	रॢ	रॣ	रे	रै	रो	रौ	रं	रँ	रः
l-	ल	ला	लि	ली	लु	लू	लृ	लॄ	लॢ	लॣ	ले	लै	लो	लौ	लं	लँ	लः
ḻ-	ळ	ळा	ळि	ळी	ळु	ळू	ळृ	ळॄ	ळॢ	ळॣ	ळे	ळै	ळो	ळौ	ळं	ळँ	ळः
v-	व	वा	वि	वी	वु	वू	वृ	वॄ	वॢ	वॣ	वे	वै	वो	वौ	वं	वँ	वः
ś-	श	शा	शि	शी	शु	शू	शृ	शॄ	शॢ	शॣ	शे	शै	शो	शौ	शं	शँ	शः
ṣ-	ष	षा	षि	षी	षु	षू	षृ	षॄ	षॢ	षॣ	षे	षै	षो	षौ	षं	षँ	षः
s-	स	सा	सि	सी	सु	सू	सृ	सॄ	सॢ	सॣ	से	सै	सो	सौ	सं	सँ	सः
h-	ह	हा	हि	ही	हु	हू	हृ	हॄ	हॢ	हॣ	हे	है	हो	हौ	हं	हँ	हः

=== Old forms ===
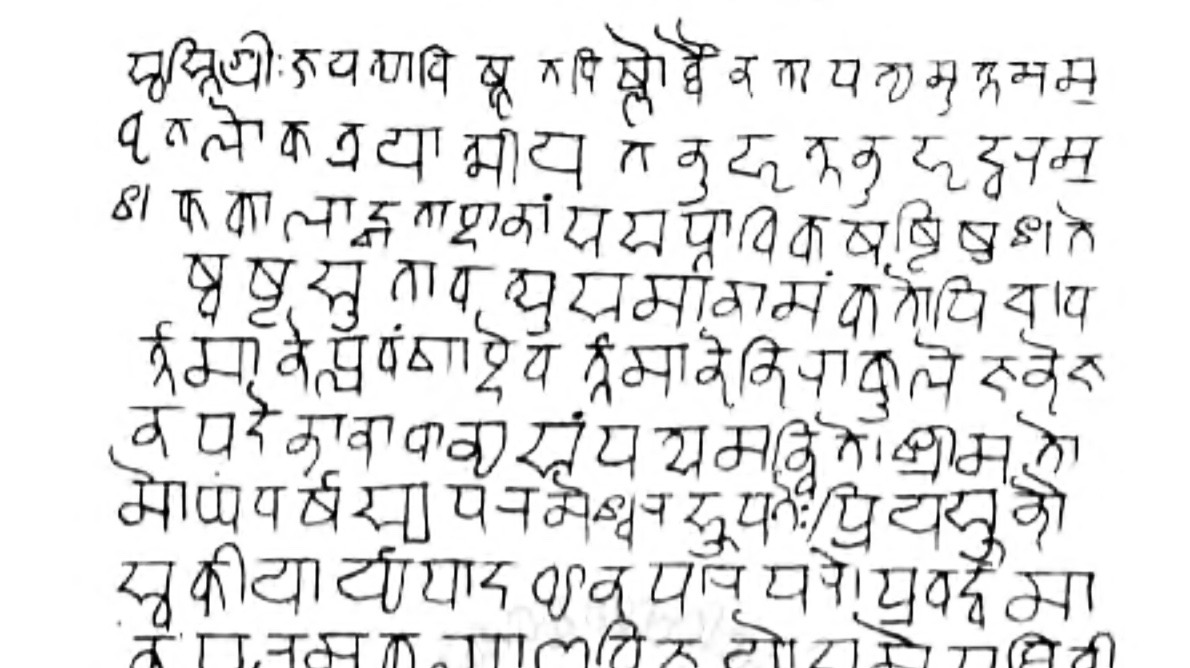
A mid-10th century Sanskrit land grant for a college, written in Devanāgarī, and discovered on a stone buried in north Karnataka. Parts of the inscription are written in Kannada script.

The following letter variants are also in use, particularly in older texts and in specific regions:

Letter variants
Standard	Ancient/Regional

=== Conjunct consonants ===
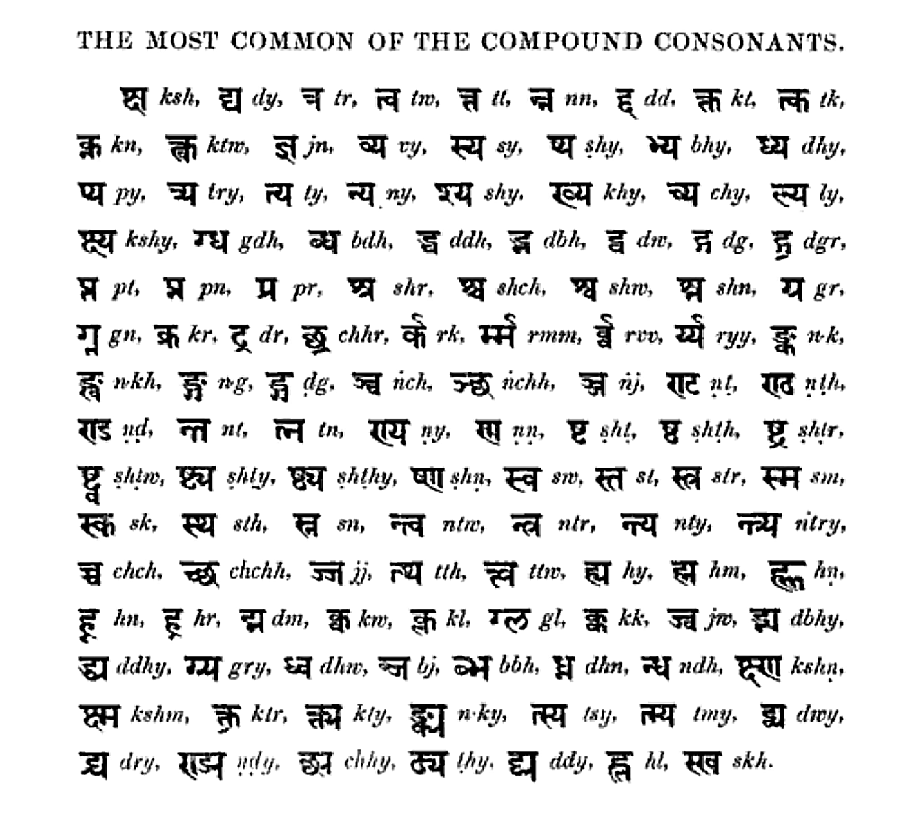
Picture with conjuncts from An Elementary Grammar of the Sanscrit Language, page 25, Monier Monier-Williams (1846).

As mentioned, successive consonants lacking a vowel in between them may physically join as a conjunct consonant or ligature. When Devanāgarī is used for writing languages other than Sanskrit, conjuncts are used mostly with Sanskrit words and loan words. Native words typically use the basic consonant, and native speakers know to suppress the vowel when it is conventional to do so. For example, the native Hindi word karnā is written करना (ka-ra-nā). The government of these clusters ranges from widely to narrowly applicable rules, with special exceptions within. While standardised for the most part, there are certain variations in clustering, of which the Unicode used on this page is just one scheme. The following are several rules:

Few examples of श consonant clusters.

- 24 out of the 36 consonants contain a vertical right stroke (य ya, न na, ग ga etc.). As first or middle fragments/members of a cluster (when letters are to be written as half-pronounced), they lose that stroke. e.g. त्‌व t-va → त्व tva, ण्‌ढ ṇ-ḍha → ण्ढ ṇḍha, स्‌थ s-tha → स्थ stha. In Unicode, as in Hindi, these consonants without their vertical stems are called "half forms". श śa appears as a different, simple ribbon-shaped fragment preceding व va, न na, च ca, ल la, and र ra, causing these second members to be shifted down and reduced in size. Thus श्व śva, श्न śna, श्च śca, श्ल śla, श्र śra, and शृ śṛi.
- र ra as a first member takes the form of a curved upward dash above the final character or its ā- diacritic. e.g. र्व rva, र्वा rvā, र्स्प rspa, र्स्पा rspā. In Marathi and Nepali, र ra as a first member of a conjunct also takes on an eyelash form when in front of glides and semivowels. e.g. र्‍य rya, र्‍व rva. As a final member with ट ṭa, ठ ṭha, ड ḍa, ढ ḍha, ड़ ṛa, छ cha, it is two lines together below the character pointed downwards. Thus ट्र ṭra, ठ्र ṭhra, ड्र ḍra, ढ्र ḍhra, ड़्र ṛra, छ्र chra. Elsewhere, as a final member, it is a diagonal stroke extending leftwards and down. e.g. क्र ग्र भ्र ब्र. त ta is shifted up to make the conjunct त्र tra.
- As first members, remaining characters lacking vertical strokes such as द da and ह ha may have their second member, reduced in size and lacking its horizontal stroke, placed underneath. क ka, छ cha, and फ pha shorten their right hooks and join them directly to the following member.
- The conjuncts for kṣa and jña are not clearly derived from the letters making up their components. The conjunct for kṣa is क्ष (क् + ष) and for jña it is ज्ञ (ज् + ञ).

=== Accent marks ===
The pitch accent of Vedic Sanskrit is written with various symbols depending on shakha. In the Rigveda, anudātta is written with a bar below the line (◌॒), svarita with a stroke above the line (◌॑) while udātta is unmarked.

=== Punctuation ===
The end of a sentence or half-verse may be marked with the "।" symbol (called a daṇḍa, meaning "bar", or called a pūrṇa virām, meaning "full stop/pause"). The end of a full verse may be marked with a double daṇḍa, a "॥" symbol. A comma (called an alpa virām, meaning "short stop/pause") is used to denote a natural pause in speech. Punctuation marks of Western origin, such as the colon, semicolon, exclamation mark, dash, and question mark have been in use in Devanāgarī script since at least the 1900s, matching their use in European languages.

=== Fonts ===
A variety of computer fonts are in use for Devanāgarī. These include Akshar, Annapurna, Arial, CDAC-Gist Surekh, CDAC-Gist Yogesh, Chandas, Gargi, Gurumaa, Jaipur, Jana, Kalimati, Kanjirowa, Lohit Devanagari, Mangal, Kokila, Preeti, Raghu, Sanskrit2003, Santipur OT, Siddhanta, and Thyaka.

The form of Devanāgarī fonts varies with function. According to Harvard College for Sanskrit studies:

Uttara [companion to Chandas] is the best in terms of ligatures but, because it is designed for Vedic as well, requires so much vertical space that it is not well suited for the "user interface font" (though an excellent choice for the "original field" font). Santipur OT is a beautiful font reflecting a very early [medieval era] typesetting style for Devanagari. Sanskrit 2003 is a good all-around font and has more ligatures than most fonts, though students will probably find the spacing of the CDAC-Gist Surekh font makes for quicker comprehension and reading.

The Google Fonts project has several typefaces for Devanāgarī in a variety of fonts in serif, sans-serif, display and handwriting categories.

== Numerals ==
Devanāgarī digits
०	१	२	३	४	५	६	७	८	९
0	1	2	3	4	5	6	7	8	9

== Transliteration ==
Indic scripts share common features, and along with Devanāgarī, all major Indic scripts have been historically used to preserve Vedic and post-Vedic Sanskrit texts.

There are several methods of Romanisation or transliteration from Devanāgarī to the Roman script.

=== Hunterian system ===
The Hunterian system is the national system of romanisation in India, officially adopted by the Government of India.

=== ISO 15919 ===
A standard transliteration convention was codified in the ISO 15919 standard of 2001. It uses diacritics to map the much larger set of Brāhmic graphemes to the Latin script. The Devanāgarī-specific portion is nearly identical to the academic standard for Sanskrit, IAST.

=== IAST ===
The International Alphabet of Sanskrit Transliteration (IAST) is the academic standard for the romanisation of Sanskrit. IAST is the de facto standard used in printed publications, like books, magazines, and electronic texts with Unicode fonts. It is based on a standard established by the Congress of Orientalists at Athens in 1912. The ISO 15919 standard of 2001 codified the transliteration convention to include an expanded standard for sister scripts of Devanāgarī.

The National Library at Kolkata romanisation, intended for the romanisation of all Indic scripts, is an extension of IAST.

=== Harvard-Kyoto ===
Compared to IAST, Harvard-Kyoto looks much simpler. It does not contain all the diacritic marks that IAST contains. It was designed to simplify the task of putting a large amount of Sanskrit textual material into machine-readable form, and the inventors stated that it reduces the effort needed in transliteration of Sanskrit texts on the keyboard. This makes typing in Harvard-Kyoto much easier than IAST. Harvard-Kyoto uses capital letters that can be difficult to read in the middle of words.

=== ITRANS ===
ITRANS is a lossless transliteration scheme of Devanāgarī into ASCII that is widely used on Usenet. It is an extension of the Harvard-Kyoto scheme. In ITRANS, the word devanāgarī is written "devanaagarii" or "devanAgarI". ITRANS is associated with an application of the same name that enables typesetting in Indic scripts. The user inputs in Roman letters, and the ITRANS pre-processor translates the Roman letters into Devanāgarī (or other Indic languages). The latest version of ITRANS is version 5.30, released in July 2001. It is similar to the Velthuis system and was created by Avinash Chopde to help print various Indic scripts with personal computers.

==== Velthuis ====
The disadvantage of the above ASCII schemes is case-sensitivity, implying that transliterated names may not be capitalised. This difficulty is avoided with the system developed in 1996 by Frans Velthuis for TeX, loosely based on IAST, in which case is irrelevant.

=== ALA-LC Romanisation ===
ALA-LC romanisation is a transliteration scheme approved by the Library of Congress and the American Library Association, and widely used in North American libraries. Transliteration tables are based on languages, so there is a table for Hindi, one for Sanskrit and Prakrit, etc.

=== WX ===
WX is a Roman transliteration scheme for Indian languages, widely used among the natural language processing community in India. It originated at IIT Kanpur for computational processing of Indian languages. The salient features of this transliteration scheme are as follows.

- Every consonant and every vowel has a single mapping into Roman. Hence it is a prefix code, advantageous from computation point of view.
- Lower-case letters are used for unaspirated consonants and short vowels, while capital letters are used for aspirated consonants and long vowels. While the retroflex stops are mapped to 't, T, d, D, N', the dentals are mapped to 'w, W, x, X, n'. Hence the name 'WX', a reminder of this idiosyncratic mapping.

== Encodings ==
=== ISCII ===
ISCII is an 8-bit encoding. The lower 128 codepoints are plain ASCII, the upper 128 codepoints are ISCII-specific.

It has been designed for representing not only Devanāgarī but also various other Indic scripts as well as a Latin-based script with diacritic marks used for transliteration of the Indic scripts.

ISCII has largely been superseded by Unicode, which has, however, attempted to preserve the ISCII layout for its Indic language blocks.

=== Unicode ===
The Unicode Standard defines four blocks for Devanāgarī: Devanagari (U+0900–U+097F), Devanagari Extended (U+A8E0–U+A8FF), Devanagari Extended-A (U+11B00–11B5F), and Vedic Extensions (U+1CD0–U+1CFF).

Devanagari^{[1]} Official Unicode Consortium code chart (PDF)
	0	1	2	3	4	5	6	7	8	9	A	B	C	D	E	F
U+090x	ऀ	ँ	ं	ः	ऄ	अ	आ	इ	ई	उ	ऊ	ऋ	ऌ	ऍ	ऎ	ए
U+091x	ऐ	ऑ	ऒ	ओ	औ	क	ख	ग	घ	ङ	च	छ	ज	झ	ञ	ट
U+092x	ठ	ड	ढ	ण	त	थ	द	ध	न	ऩ	प	फ	ब	भ	म	य
U+093x	र	ऱ	ल	ळ	ऴ	व	श	ष	स	ह	ऺ	ऻ	़	ऽ	ा	ि
U+094x	ी	ु	ू	ृ	ॄ	ॅ	ॆ	े	ै	ॉ	ॊ	ो	ौ	्	ॎ	ॏ
U+095x	ॐ	॑	॒	॓	॔	ॕ	ॖ	ॗ	क़	ख़	ग़	ज़	ड़	ढ़	फ़	य़
U+096x	ॠ	ॡ	ॢ	ॣ	।	॥	०	१	२	३	४	५	६	७	८	९
U+097x	॰	ॱ	ॲ	ॳ	ॴ	ॵ	ॶ	ॷ	ॸ	ॹ	ॺ	ॻ	ॼ	ॽ	ॾ	ॿ
Notes 1.As of Unicode version 18.0

Devanagari Extended^{[1]} Official Unicode Consortium code chart (PDF)
	0	1	2	3	4	5	6	7	8	9	A	B	C	D	E	F
U+A8Ex	꣠	꣡	꣢	꣣	꣤	꣥	꣦	꣧	꣨	꣩	꣪	꣫	꣬	꣭	꣮	꣯
U+A8Fx	꣰	꣱	ꣲ	ꣳ	ꣴ	ꣵ	ꣶ	ꣷ	꣸	꣹	꣺	ꣻ	꣼	ꣽ	ꣾ	ꣿ
Notes 1.As of Unicode version 18.0

Devanagari Extended-A^{[1]}^{[2]} Official Unicode Consortium code chart (PDF)
	0	1	2	3	4	5	6	7	8	9	A	B	C	D	E	F
U+11B0x	𑬀	𑬁	𑬂	𑬃	𑬄	𑬅	𑬆	𑬇	𑬈	𑬉	𑬊					
U+11B1x																
U+11B2x																
U+11B3x																
U+11B4x																
U+11B5x																
Notes 1.As of Unicode version 18.0 2.Grey areas indicate non-assigned code points

Vedic Extensions^{[1]}^{[2]} Official Unicode Consortium code chart (PDF)
	0	1	2	3	4	5	6	7	8	9	A	B	C	D	E	F
U+1CDx	᳐	᳑	᳒	᳓	᳔	᳕	᳖	᳗	᳘	᳙	᳚	᳛	᳜	᳝	᳞	᳟
U+1CEx	᳠	᳡	᳢	᳣	᳤	᳥	᳦	᳧	᳨	ᳩ	ᳪ	ᳫ	ᳬ	᳭	ᳮ	ᳯ
U+1CFx	ᳰ	ᳱ	ᳲ	ᳳ	᳴	ᳵ	ᳶ	᳷	᳸	᳹	ᳺ					
Notes 1.As of Unicode version 18.0 2.Grey areas indicate non-assigned code points

== Devanagari keyboard layouts ==
Introduction to Inscript Key board

=== InScript layout ===
InScript is the standard keyboard layout for Devanāgarī as standardised by the Government of India. It is built into all modern major operating systems. Microsoft Windows supports the InScript layout, which can be used to input Unicode Devanagari characters. InScript is also available in some touchscreen mobile phones.

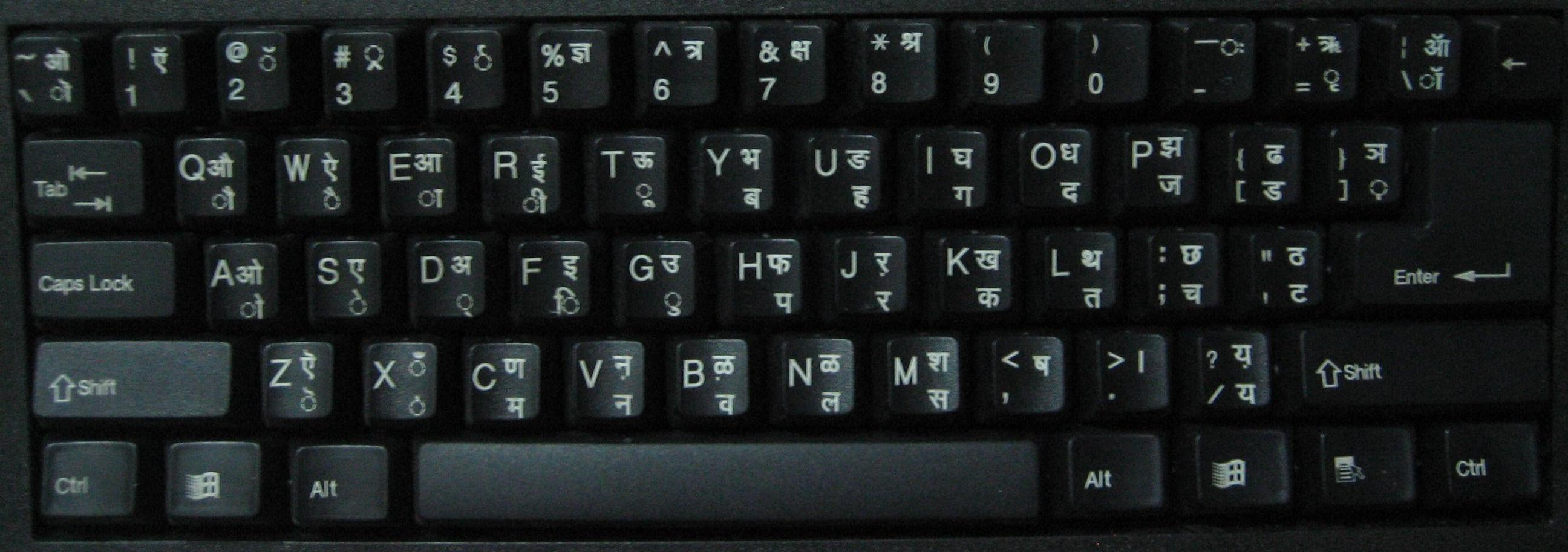
Devanāgarī INSCRIPT bilingual keyboard layout

=== Typewriter ===
This layout was used on manual typewriters when computers were not available or were uncommon. For backward compatibility, some typing tools like Indic IME still provide this layout.

=== Phonetic ===
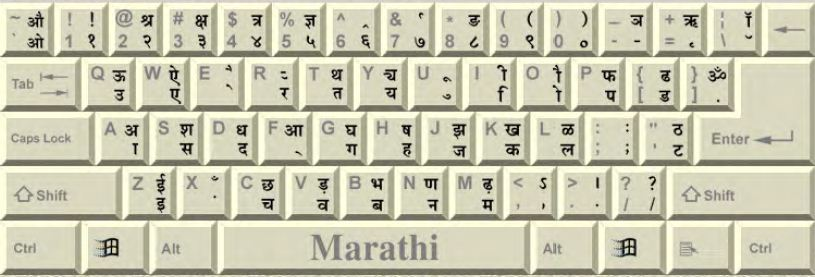
Devanāgari Phonetic Keyboard Layout

One can use ULS "लिप्यन्तरण" (Transliteration) or "इनस्क्रिप्ट" (Inscript) typing options to search or edit Devanagari-script articles as shown in this video clip example. CC instructions are available for British English.

Such tools work on phonetic transliteration. The user writes in the Latin alphabet, and the IME automatically converts it into Devanāgarī. Some popular phonetic typing tools are Akruti, Baraha IME and Google IME.

The Mac OS X operating system includes two different keyboard layouts for Devanāgarī: one resembles the INSCRIPT/KDE Linux, while the other is a phonetic layout called "Devanāgarī QWERTY".

Any one of the Unicode font input systems is fine for the Indic language Wikipedia and other wikiprojects, including Hindi, Bhojpuri, Marathi, and Nepali Wikipedia. While some people use InScript, the majority use either Google phonetic transliteration or the input facility Universal Language Selector provided on Wikipedia. On Indic language wikiprojects, the phonetic facility provided initially was Java-based, and was later supported by the Narayam extension for phonetic input facility. Currently, Indic language Wiki projects are supported by Universal Language Selector (ULS), which offers both a phonetic keyboard (Aksharantaran, Marathi: अक्षरांतरण, Hindi: लिप्यन्तरण, बोलनागरी) and InScript keyboard (Marathi: मराठी लिपी).

The Ubuntu Linux operating system supports several keyboard layouts for Devanāgarī, including Harvard-Kyoto, WX notation, Bolanagari and phonetic. The 'remington' typing method in Ubuntu IBUS is similar to the Krutidev typing method, popular in Rajasthan. The 'itrans' method is useful for those who know English (and the English keyboard) well but are not familiar with typing in Devanāgarī.

== See also ==
- Languages of India
- Devanāgarī transliteration – Transliteration from Devanagari to the Latin script
- Devanāgarī Braille – Braille used in India and Nepal
- ISCII – Coding scheme for Indian writing systems
- Nagari Pracharini Sabha – Literary Organisation for the promotion of Hindi
- Nepali – Indo-Aryan Language
- Schwa deletion in Indo-Aryan languages – Phonetic process
- Shiksha – Vedic era study of phonetics and phonology, one of six Vedangas
