= R. K. Joshi =

Indian calligrapher (1936 - 2008)

- Born: 1936; Kolhapur, India
- Died: 5 February 2008

R. K. Joshi or Raghunath Krishna Joshi (1936, in Kolhapur, Maharashtra, India – 5 February 2008, in San Francisco, USA) was an academic type designer and calligrapher. He designed the core Indian fonts used in Microsoft Windows.

== Early life ==
Joshi was born into a middle class Indian family. He was brought up in the town of Kolhapur, Maharashtra, where he developed an interest in alphabets, their shapes, styles and design. In 1952, he decided to study art at Sir J.J. Institute of Applied Art, Mumbai. During this time he found a scarcity of typefaces in Indian languages. He took up extra classes at the Government Institute of Printing Technology, located within the institute premises, where he learned that Indian typefaces were intricate and had many problems in typesetting. He participated in the first exhibition on Indian typefaces at the college.

== Professional life ==
His first professional experience was with D.J. Keymer & Co. (now O&M) in 1956. In 1961, he joined ULKA Advertising (now DraftFCB+Ulka) as Art Director. He started designing campaigns on issues regarding Family Planning and Farmers and to unite the entire country, he designed the campaigns in various Indian languages. His efforts were questioned, but he kept his belief on his philosophy and thought process. He created some stunning logos including the Welcome Group, capturing the ethos of an Indian welcome and Punjab National Bank, aptly utilizing the alphabet P in Punjabi. He designed several advertisements for Nerolac Paints and Crompton Greaves using Indian calligraphy, designed exclusive menus for the Taj Group and stationery for Chimanlals. He brought the concept of multilingual ad campaigns in India, opening up to languages crossing states. The first ever such campaign was the Ashok Jain Campaign.

=== Tryst with Types ===
Influenced by the books of Italian Masters like Arrighi, he found a new world of calligraphy to explore. He applied it to the Indian context and explored Indic scripts in Calligraphic styles. He studied the rarest manuscripts in Indic languages, of which his inspiration was a book titled Bharatiya Pracheen Lipimala by an Indian Author Gaurishankar Hirachand Ojha. This book brought to him the world of ancient scripts, like Brahmi, Sharda, Kautilya and Gupta scripts. After an intense research on these scripts, in 1966, he designed his first two fonts.

One of his challenging works was the design of the Adi Shankaracharya stamp on the occasion of Shankaracharya (Philosopher) Commemoration. There were conflicts about highlighting the picture of the saint, Prof Joshi found the solution as a logo for the philosophy itself of Advaitvad (non-dualism). This stamp was released on 17 May 1989.

=== Teaching Design ===
He was a professor of Calligraphy, Type Design and Typography at IDC, IIT, Mumbai from 1983–1996.

=== Association with C-DAC ===
He was associated with National Centre for Software Technology (NCST), now Centre for Development of Advanced Computing (C-DAC) since 1976. His R&D on the Desha Coding Scheme in 1982, under the guidance of Prof R Narsimhan; design of Pa Latino a software for digital typeface design, in collaboration with Dr. P K Ghosh; innovative computer graphics with Indian letterforms; dot matrix fonts and PS fonts as a step towards multilingual text processors like Aalekh (Hinditron), Vividha(CMC), Vidura(IGNCA). He retired in 1996, only to be deeply involved with C-DAC as the Visiting Design Specialist. The Microsoft Project, a series of O/S fonts were developed for Microsoft for their Windows 2000 to enable typing in Indian languages on Windows. Another series of multilingual fonts for 12 Indian languages were developed under project 'IndiX'. His next initiatives were to develop an applied research project so as to develop his 'Texta' models into real innovative typographic outputs using digital technology.

=== Exhibitions and Activities ===
He held several exhibitions like Aakar in Delhi, Prathama in Mumbai, Akshara in Germany. He actively conducted national and international workshops, seminars and lecture tours for the spread of typography. His R&D in Indian Paleography, Epigraphy and Manuscriptology are phenomenal works to inculcate a new generation of aesthetic Indian typefaces. He also wrote poems and undertook the first ever calligraphic research in Indian manuscripts and epigraphic writings.

He was one of the featured speakers in ICOGRADA, India in 2008.

=== The Happenings ===
His passion for letterforms brought a new trend on the streets of Bombay. Around 16 Multilingual 'Happenings' were staged in a single year. The main aim was to expose the rich heritage of Indian scripts to the common man. The look and sound of Indian alphabets were brought out as an experience through music, theatre and dance.

Prof Joshi gave an interview in September 2006, to Typeradio at ATypI in Lisbon.

=== Honours ===
- Bukva-raz, an International Award for his 'Raghu' font
- Cag Hall of fame, 1990
- Lifetime achievement award by Ad Club, 2004
- ATypI country delegate for India
- Type Director's Club
- ICOGRADA
