= JA =

Ja or JA may refer to:

== Arts and entertainment ==
- Ja (novel), or Yes, by Thomas Bernhard
- JA (TV series), a Danish television show

== Biology ==
- Ja (beetle), an insect genus
- Jasmonic acid, a plant hormone

== Language ==
- Ja, grammatical particle meaning "yes" in most Germanic languages, Slovene language and informal English
- Ja, meaning "I" in many Slavic languages
- Ya (Cyrillic) (Я), a Cyrillic letter, pronounced /ja/ in some languages
- Japanese language (ISO 639-1 alpha-2 code JA)
- Ja (Indic), a glyph in the Brahmic family of scripts
- Ja (Javanese) (ꦗ), a letter in the Javanese script

== Organizations ==
- Jamiat Ahle Hadith, a Pakistani political party
- Japan Agricultural Cooperatives (also JA Group)
- Junior Achievement, a US-based youth organization
- Yugoslav Action (Serbo-Croatian: Jugoslovenska akcija), a Yugoslav nationalist organization (1930–1935)

== People ==
- Ja (footballer) (born 1987), Cape Verdean footballer
- Ja Morant (born 1999), American basketball player
- JA One (born 1969), American graffiti artist
- Ja Rule (born 1976), American rapper, singer, songwriter, and actor

== Transportation ==
- Chrysler JA platform, a series of vehicles made by Chrysler
- NZR JA Class, a 4-8-2 steam locomotive used by New Zealand Railways
- British Rail Class 73/0 electro-diesel locomotives (Pre-TOPS classification JA)
- Saikyō Line, whose official symbol is
- B&H Airlines (IATA:JA), a Bosnian airline

== Other uses ==
- Ja (unit), a unit of measurement of length in Korea
- Japan (NATO country code)
- Judge Advocate
- Judge of Appeal
- Jammu and Kashmir (union territory), India (postal code)
- Japan (aircraft registration prefix JA)

== See also ==
- YA (disambiguation)
