= Ja (Javanese) =

ja
- ꦗ
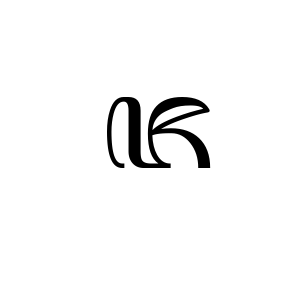
- Aksara nglegena

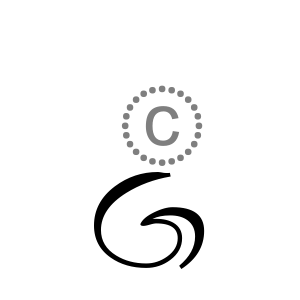
- Aksara pasangan

Usage
- Writing system: Javanese script
- Latin orthography: ja
- Sound values: [dʒ]
- In Unicode: A997

ꦗ is a syllable in the Javanese script that represents the sounds /dʒɔ/, /dʒa/. It is transliterated to Latin as "ja" or "ya", and sometimes in Indonesian orthography as "jo" or "yo". It has another form (pasangan), which is ◌꧀ꦗ, but represented by a single Unicode code point, U+A997.

== Pasangan ==
Its pasangan form ◌꧀ꦗ, is located on the bottom side of the previous syllable. For example, ꦲꦤꦏ꧀ꦗꦫꦤ꧀ - anak jaran (little horse).

== Extended form ==
The letter ꦗ doesn't have a murda form.

Using cecak telu (ꦗ꦳), the syllable represents /z/.

ꦗ with a cerek (ꦘ) is called Nya murda.

== Mahaprana ==
Mahaprana letters were originally aspirated consonants used in Sanskrit and Kawi transliterations. However, there are no aspirated consonants in modern Javanese. The mahaprana form of ꦗ is ꦙ.

== Glyphs ==
Nglegena forms				Pasangan forms			
ꦗ ja	ꦗꦃ jah	ꦗꦁ jang	ꦗꦂ jar	◌꧀ꦗ -ja	◌꧀ꦗꦃ -jah	◌꧀ꦗꦁ -jang	◌꧀ꦗꦂ -jar
ꦗꦺ je	ꦗꦺꦃ jeh	ꦗꦺꦁ jeng	ꦗꦺꦂ jer	◌꧀ꦗꦺ -je	◌꧀ꦗꦺꦃ -jeh	◌꧀ꦗꦺꦁ -jeng	◌꧀ꦗꦺꦂ -jer
ꦗꦼ jê	ꦗꦼꦃ jêh	ꦗꦼꦁ jêng	ꦗꦼꦂ jêr	◌꧀ꦗꦼ -jê	◌꧀ꦗꦼꦃ -jêh	◌꧀ꦗꦼꦁ -jêng	◌꧀ꦗꦼꦂ -jêr
ꦗꦶ ji	ꦗꦶꦃ jih	ꦗꦶꦁ jing	ꦗꦶꦂ jir	◌꧀ꦗꦶ -ji	◌꧀ꦗꦶꦃ -jih	◌꧀ꦗꦶꦁ -jing	◌꧀ꦗꦶꦂ -jir
ꦗꦺꦴ jo	ꦗꦺꦴꦃ joh	ꦗꦺꦴꦁ jong	ꦗꦺꦴꦂ jor	◌꧀ꦗꦺꦴ -jo	◌꧀ꦗꦺꦴꦃ -joh	◌꧀ꦗꦺꦴꦁ -jong	◌꧀ꦗꦺꦴꦂ -jor
ꦗꦸ ju	ꦗꦸꦃ juh	ꦗꦸꦁ jung	ꦗꦸꦂ jur	◌꧀ꦗꦸ -ju	◌꧀ꦗꦸꦃ -juh	◌꧀ꦗꦸꦁ -jung	◌꧀ꦗꦸꦂ -jur
ꦗꦿ jra	ꦗꦿꦃ jrah	ꦗꦿꦁ jrang	ꦗꦿꦂ jrar	◌꧀ꦗꦿ -jra	◌꧀ꦗꦿꦃ -jrah	◌꧀ꦗꦿꦁ -jrang	◌꧀ꦗꦿꦂ -jrar
ꦗꦿꦺ jre	ꦗꦿꦺꦃ jreh	ꦗꦿꦺꦁ jreng	ꦗꦿꦺꦂ jrer	◌꧀ꦗꦿꦺ -jre	◌꧀ꦗꦿꦺꦃ -jreh	◌꧀ꦗꦿꦺꦁ -jreng	◌꧀ꦗꦿꦺꦂ -jrer
ꦗꦽ jrê	ꦗꦽꦃ jrêh	ꦗꦽꦁ jrêng	ꦗꦽꦂ jrêr	◌꧀ꦗꦽ -jrê	◌꧀ꦗꦽꦃ -jrêh	◌꧀ꦗꦽꦁ -jrêng	◌꧀ꦗꦽꦂ -jrêr
ꦗꦿꦶ jri	ꦗꦿꦶꦃ jrih	ꦗꦿꦶꦁ jring	ꦗꦿꦶꦂ jrir	◌꧀ꦗꦿꦶ -jri	◌꧀ꦗꦿꦶꦃ -jrih	◌꧀ꦗꦿꦶꦁ -jring	◌꧀ꦗꦿꦶꦂ -jrir
ꦗꦿꦺꦴ jro	ꦗꦿꦺꦴꦃ jroh	ꦗꦿꦺꦴꦁ jrong	ꦗꦿꦺꦴꦂ jror	◌꧀ꦗꦿꦺꦴ -jro	◌꧀ꦗꦿꦺꦴꦃ -jroh	◌꧀ꦗꦿꦺꦴꦁ -jrong	◌꧀ꦗꦿꦺꦴꦂ -jror
ꦗꦿꦸ jru	ꦗꦿꦸꦃ jruh	ꦗꦿꦸꦁ jrung	ꦗꦿꦸꦂ jrur	◌꧀ꦗꦿꦸ -jru	◌꧀ꦗꦿꦸꦃ -jruh	◌꧀ꦗꦿꦸꦁ -jrung	◌꧀ꦗꦿꦸꦂ -jrur
ꦗꦾ jya	ꦗꦾꦃ jyah	ꦗꦾꦁ jyang	ꦗꦾꦂ jyar	◌꧀ꦗꦾ -jya	◌꧀ꦗꦾꦃ -jyah	◌꧀ꦗꦾꦁ -jyang	◌꧀ꦗꦾꦂ -jyar
ꦗꦾꦺ jye	ꦗꦾꦺꦃ jyeh	ꦗꦾꦺꦁ jyeng	ꦗꦾꦺꦂ jyer	◌꧀ꦗꦾꦺ -jye	◌꧀ꦗꦾꦺꦃ -jyeh	◌꧀ꦗꦾꦺꦁ -jyeng	◌꧀ꦗꦾꦺꦂ -jyer
ꦗꦾꦼ jyê	ꦗꦾꦼꦃ jyêh	ꦗꦾꦼꦁ jyêng	ꦗꦾꦼꦂ jyêr	◌꧀ꦗꦾꦼ -jyê	◌꧀ꦗꦾꦼꦃ -jyêh	◌꧀ꦗꦾꦼꦁ -jyêng	◌꧀ꦗꦾꦼꦂ -jyêr
ꦗꦾꦶ jyi	ꦗꦾꦶꦃ jyih	ꦗꦾꦶꦁ jying	ꦗꦾꦶꦂ jyir	◌꧀ꦗꦾꦶ -jyi	◌꧀ꦗꦾꦶꦃ -jyih	◌꧀ꦗꦾꦶꦁ -jying	◌꧀ꦗꦾꦶꦂ -jyir
ꦗꦾꦺꦴ jyo	ꦗꦾꦺꦴꦃ jyoh	ꦗꦾꦺꦴꦁ jyong	ꦗꦾꦺꦴꦂ jyor	◌꧀ꦗꦾꦺꦴ -jyo	◌꧀ꦗꦾꦺꦴꦃ -jyoh	◌꧀ꦗꦾꦺꦴꦁ -jyong	◌꧀ꦗꦾꦺꦴꦂ -jyor
ꦗꦾꦸ jyu	ꦗꦾꦸꦃ jyuh	ꦗꦾꦸꦁ jyung	ꦗꦾꦸꦂ jyur	◌꧀ꦗꦾꦸ -jyu	◌꧀ꦗꦾꦸꦃ -jyuh	◌꧀ꦗꦾꦸꦁ -jyung	◌꧀ꦗꦾꦸꦂ -jyur

Other forms
Nglegena forms				Pasangan forms			
ꦗ꦳ za	ꦗ꦳ꦃ zah	ꦗ꦳ꦁ zang	ꦗ꦳ꦂ zar	◌꧀ꦗ꦳ -za	◌꧀ꦗ꦳ꦃ -zah	◌꧀ꦗ꦳ꦁ -zang	◌꧀ꦗ꦳ꦂ -zar
ꦗ꦳ꦺ ze	ꦗ꦳ꦺꦃ zeh	ꦗ꦳ꦺꦁ zeng	ꦗ꦳ꦺꦂ zer	◌꧀ꦗ꦳ꦺ -ze	◌꧀ꦗ꦳ꦺꦃ -zeh	◌꧀ꦗ꦳ꦺꦁ -zeng	◌꧀ꦗ꦳ꦺꦂ -zer
ꦗ꦳ꦼ zê	ꦗ꦳ꦼꦃ zêh	ꦗ꦳ꦼꦁ zêng	ꦗ꦳ꦼꦂ zêr	◌꧀ꦗ꦳ꦼ -zê	◌꧀ꦗ꦳ꦼꦃ -zêh	◌꧀ꦗ꦳ꦼꦁ -zêng	◌꧀ꦗ꦳ꦼꦂ -zêr
ꦗ꦳ꦶ zi	ꦗ꦳ꦶꦃ zih	ꦗ꦳ꦶꦁ zing	ꦗ꦳ꦶꦂ zir	◌꧀ꦗ꦳ꦶ -zi	◌꧀ꦗ꦳ꦶꦃ -zih	◌꧀ꦗ꦳ꦶꦁ -zing	◌꧀ꦗ꦳ꦶꦂ -zir
ꦗ꦳ꦺꦴ zo	ꦗ꦳ꦺꦴꦃ zoh	ꦗ꦳ꦺꦴꦁ zong	ꦗ꦳ꦺꦴꦂ zor	◌꧀ꦗ꦳ꦺꦴ -zo	◌꧀ꦗ꦳ꦺꦴꦃ -zoh	◌꧀ꦗ꦳ꦺꦴꦁ -zong	◌꧀ꦗ꦳ꦺꦴꦂ -zor
ꦗ꦳ꦸ zu	ꦗ꦳ꦸꦃ zuh	ꦗ꦳ꦸꦁ zung	ꦗ꦳ꦸꦂ zur	◌꧀ꦗ꦳ꦸ -zu	◌꧀ꦗ꦳ꦸꦃ -zuh	◌꧀ꦗ꦳ꦸꦁ -zung	◌꧀ꦗ꦳ꦸꦂ -zur
ꦗ꦳ꦿ zra	ꦗ꦳ꦿꦃ zrah	ꦗ꦳ꦿꦁ zrang	ꦗ꦳ꦿꦂ zrar	◌꧀ꦗ꦳ꦿ -zra	◌꧀ꦗ꦳ꦿꦃ -zrah	◌꧀ꦗ꦳ꦿꦁ -zrang	◌꧀ꦗ꦳ꦿꦂ -zrar
ꦗ꦳ꦿꦺ zre	ꦗ꦳ꦿꦺꦃ zreh	ꦗ꦳ꦿꦺꦁ zreng	ꦗ꦳ꦿꦺꦂ zrer	◌꧀ꦗ꦳ꦿꦺ -zre	◌꧀ꦗ꦳ꦿꦺꦃ -zreh	◌꧀ꦗ꦳ꦿꦺꦁ -zreng	◌꧀ꦗ꦳ꦿꦺꦂ -zrer
ꦗ꦳ꦽ zrê	ꦗ꦳ꦽꦃ zrêh	ꦗ꦳ꦽꦁ zrêng	ꦗ꦳ꦽꦂ zrêr	◌꧀ꦗ꦳ꦽ -zrê	◌꧀ꦗ꦳ꦽꦃ -zrêh	◌꧀ꦗ꦳ꦽꦁ -zrêng	◌꧀ꦗ꦳ꦽꦂ -zrêr
ꦗ꦳ꦿꦶ zri	ꦗ꦳ꦿꦶꦃ zrih	ꦗ꦳ꦿꦶꦁ zring	ꦗ꦳ꦿꦶꦂ zrir	◌꧀ꦗ꦳ꦿꦶ -zri	◌꧀ꦗ꦳ꦿꦶꦃ -zrih	◌꧀ꦗ꦳ꦿꦶꦁ -zring	◌꧀ꦗ꦳ꦿꦶꦂ -zrir
ꦗ꦳ꦿꦺꦴ zro	ꦗ꦳ꦿꦺꦴꦃ zroh	ꦗ꦳ꦿꦺꦴꦁ zrong	ꦗ꦳ꦿꦺꦴꦂ zror	◌꧀ꦗ꦳ꦿꦺꦴ -zro	◌꧀ꦗ꦳ꦿꦺꦴꦃ -zroh	◌꧀ꦗ꦳ꦿꦺꦴꦁ -zrong	◌꧀ꦗ꦳ꦿꦺꦴꦂ -zror
ꦗ꦳ꦿꦸ zru	ꦗ꦳ꦿꦸꦃ zruh	ꦗ꦳ꦿꦸꦁ zrung	ꦗ꦳ꦿꦸꦂ zrur	◌꧀ꦗ꦳ꦿꦸ -zru	◌꧀ꦗ꦳ꦿꦸꦃ -zruh	◌꧀ꦗ꦳ꦿꦸꦁ -zrung	◌꧀ꦗ꦳ꦿꦸꦂ -zrur
ꦗ꦳ꦾ zya	ꦗ꦳ꦾꦃ zyah	ꦗ꦳ꦾꦁ zyang	ꦗ꦳ꦾꦂ zyar	◌꧀ꦗ꦳ꦾ -zya	◌꧀ꦗ꦳ꦾꦃ -zyah	◌꧀ꦗ꦳ꦾꦁ -zyang	◌꧀ꦗ꦳ꦾꦂ -zyar
ꦗ꦳ꦾꦺ zye	ꦗ꦳ꦾꦺꦃ zyeh	ꦗ꦳ꦾꦺꦁ zyeng	ꦗ꦳ꦾꦺꦂ zyer	◌꧀ꦗ꦳ꦾꦺ -zye	◌꧀ꦗ꦳ꦾꦺꦃ -zyeh	◌꧀ꦗ꦳ꦾꦺꦁ -zyeng	◌꧀ꦗ꦳ꦾꦺꦂ -zyer
ꦗ꦳ꦾꦼ zyê	ꦗ꦳ꦾꦼꦃ zyêh	ꦗ꦳ꦾꦼꦁ zyêng	ꦗ꦳ꦾꦼꦂ zyêr	◌꧀ꦗ꦳ꦾꦼ -zyê	◌꧀ꦗ꦳ꦾꦼꦃ -zyêh	◌꧀ꦗ꦳ꦾꦼꦁ -zyêng	◌꧀ꦗ꦳ꦾꦼꦂ -zyêr
ꦗ꦳ꦾꦶ zyi	ꦗ꦳ꦾꦶꦃ zyih	ꦗ꦳ꦾꦶꦁ zying	ꦗ꦳ꦾꦶꦂ zyir	◌꧀ꦗ꦳ꦾꦶ -zyi	◌꧀ꦗ꦳ꦾꦶꦃ -zyih	◌꧀ꦗ꦳ꦾꦶꦁ -zying	◌꧀ꦗ꦳ꦾꦶꦂ -zyir
ꦗ꦳ꦾꦺꦴ zyo	ꦗ꦳ꦾꦺꦴꦃ zyoh	ꦗ꦳ꦾꦺꦴꦁ zyong	ꦗ꦳ꦾꦺꦴꦂ zyor	◌꧀ꦗ꦳ꦾꦺꦴ -zyo	◌꧀ꦗ꦳ꦾꦺꦴꦃ -zyoh	◌꧀ꦗ꦳ꦾꦺꦴꦁ -zyong	◌꧀ꦗ꦳ꦾꦺꦴꦂ -zyor
ꦗ꦳ꦾꦸ zyu	ꦗ꦳ꦾꦸꦃ zyuh	ꦗ꦳ꦾꦸꦁ zyung	ꦗ꦳ꦾꦸꦂ zyur	◌꧀ꦗ꦳ꦾꦸ -zyu	◌꧀ꦗ꦳ꦾꦸꦃ -zyuh	◌꧀ꦗ꦳ꦾꦸꦁ -zyung	◌꧀ꦗ꦳ꦾꦸꦂ -zyur

== Unicode block ==
Javanese script was added to the Unicode Standard in October, 2009 with the release of version 5.2.

Javanese^{[1]}^{[2]} Official Unicode Consortium code chart (PDF)
	0	1	2	3	4	5	6	7	8	9	A	B	C	D	E	F
U+A98x	ꦀ	ꦁ	ꦂ	ꦃ	ꦄ	ꦅ	ꦆ	ꦇ	ꦈ	ꦉ	ꦊ	ꦋ	ꦌ	ꦍ	ꦎ	ꦏ
U+A99x	ꦐ	ꦑ	ꦒ	ꦓ	ꦔ	ꦕ	ꦖ	ꦗ	ꦘ	ꦙ	ꦚ	ꦛ	ꦜ	ꦝ	ꦞ	ꦟ
U+A9Ax	ꦠ	ꦡ	ꦢ	ꦣ	ꦤ	ꦥ	ꦦ	ꦧ	ꦨ	ꦩ	ꦪ	ꦫ	ꦬ	ꦭ	ꦮ	ꦯ
U+A9Bx	ꦰ	ꦱ	ꦲ	꦳	ꦴ	ꦵ	ꦶ	ꦷ	ꦸ	ꦹ	ꦺ	ꦻ	ꦼ	ꦽ	ꦾ	ꦿ
U+A9Cx	꧀	꧁	꧂	꧃	꧄	꧅	꧆	꧇	꧈	꧉	꧊	꧋	꧌	꧍		ꧏ
U+A9Dx	꧐	꧑	꧒	꧓	꧔	꧕	꧖	꧗	꧘	꧙					꧞	꧟
Notes 1.As of Unicode version 17.0 2.Grey areas indicate non-assigned code points

== See also ==
- Ja (Indic), a general overview encompassing other Indic scripts
