= JA (TV series) =

Danish television series

JA. is a Danish television show that broadcast on TV 2. The pilot was broadcast on 23 September 2009. It is a humorous show in which the four panelists compete against each other to demonstrate ways in which ideas suggested by a studio audience could be implemented to make the world a better place. An example from the pilot is a bucket with holes in. At the end of each panelists presentation the studio audience vote Yes (or Ja) if they like the idea. The pilot edition was won by Danish comedian Alex Pedersen after he got four Ja's from his five presentations.
