= Slavic vocabulary =

The following list is a comparison of basic Proto-Slavic vocabulary and the corresponding reflexes in the modern languages, for assistance in understanding the discussion in Proto-Slavic and History of the Slavic languages. The word list is based on the Swadesh word list, developed by the linguist Morris Swadesh, a tool to study the evolution of languages via comparison, containing a set of 207 basic words which can be found in every language and are rarely borrowed. However, the words given as the modern versions are not necessarily the normal words with the given meaning in the various modern languages, but the words directly descended from the corresponding Proto-Slavic word (the reflex). The list here is given both in the orthography of each language, with accent marks added as necessary to aid in pronunciation and Proto-Slavic reconstruction. See below for a capsule summary of how to pronounce each language, as well as some discussion of the conventions used.

== Table ==
Slavic languages
Translation	Late Proto-Slavic	class	Russian		Ukrainian		Bulgarian		Czech	Slovak	Polish	Serbo-Croatian		Slovene	Macedonian	
Translation	Late Proto-Slavic	class	Cyrillic	Latin	Cyrillic	Latin	Cyrillic	Latin	Czech	Slovak	Polish	standard (Shtokavian)	Chakavian	Slovene	Cyrillic	Latin
I	*(j)azъ, (j)ā	prn.	я	ja	я	ja	аз/я(dial.)	az/ja(dial.)	já	ja	ja	jȃ	jå̃	jàz	јас	jas
you (singular)	*ty	prn.	ты	ty	ти	ty	ти	ti	ty	ty	ty	tȋ	tĩ	tȋ	ти	ti
he, she, it	*onъ	prn.	он, она, оно	on, oná, onó	він, вона, воно	vin, voná, vonó	той, тя, то	toj, tya, to	on, ona, ono			ȍn/ȏn, òna, òno	õn, onȁ, onȍ	òn, óna, onọ̑/óno	тој/оној	toj/onoj
we	*my	prn.	мы	my	ми	my	ни́е	níe	my	my	my	mȋ	mĩ	mȋ	ние	nie
you (plural)	*vy	prn.	вы	vy	ви	vy	ви́е	víe	vy	vy	wy	vȋ	vĩ	vȋ	вие	vie
they	*oni, *ony, *ona	prn.	они́	on'í	вони́	vony	те	te	oni, ony, ona	oni, ony	oni, one	oni, one, ona		oni, one, ona	тие/оние	tie/onie
this, that	*tъ	prn.	то	tot, ta, to	той, та, то	toj, ta, to	(това́)	(tová)	ten, ta, to	ten, tá, to	ten, ta, to	tȃj, tȃ, tȏ	tȁ, tȃ, tȏ/tȍ	tȃ, tȃ, tọ̑	ова/она	ova/ona
here	*sьde, *tu		здесь, тут	zd'es', tut	тут	tut	тук, тука	tuk, tuka	zde, tu	tu	tu, tutaj	tu		tù, túkaj, zde	овде, тука	ovde, tuka
there	*tamъ		там	tam	там	tam	там	tam	tam	tam	tam	tamo		tam	таму	tamu
who	*kъto	prn.	кто	kto	хто	khto	((кой))	((koi))	kdo	kto	kto	(t)kȍ; ki		kdọ́	кој	koj
what	*čьto, *čь	prn.	что	čto /što/	що	ščo	що (dial.)	shto	co	čo	co	štȍ/šta	(Vrg.) ča (<*čь)	kaj	што	što
where	*kъde	prn.	где	gd'e	де	de	къде	kəde	kde	kde	gdzie	gd(j)ȅ	kadȅ (Orb.)	kjẹ́	каде	kade
when	*kogъda; *kogъdy	adv./conj.	когда́	kogdá	коли́	kolý	кога́	kogá	(kdy); OCz. kehdy	kedy	kiedy, gdy	kàda		kdáj	кога	koga
how; what (kind of)	kakъ	adv.; prn.	как	kak; kakój	як	jak	как, какъв	kak, kakɤv	(jak) (OCz. jaký)	ako (OSk. aký)	(jak), jaki/jaka/jakie (arch. jako, jakowy/jakowa/jakowe)	kàko, kakav/kakva/kakvo		kakọ̑, kakšen/kakšna/kakšno	како, каков/каква/какво	kako, kakov/kakva/kakvo
not	*ne	adv.	не	ne	ні	ni	не	ne	ne	nie	nie	ne		nè	не	ne
all	*vьśь, *vьśja, vьśe	prn.	весь, вся, всё	v'es', vs'a, vs'o	весь, вся, вcе	ves', vsja, vse	(вси́чки)/вси	(vsíčki)/vsi	(všichni); OCz. veš, všě, vše	(všetci); OSk. vše	(wszyscy); OPl. wszy, wsza, wsze	sȁv, svȁ, svȅ	svȁs, svȁ, svȅ	vǝ̀s, vsà, vsè	се/сето	se/seto
many	*mъnogъ	adj. o	мно́гий	mnógij	бага́то	baháto	мно́го	mnógo (adv.)	mnohý	mnohí	mnogi	mnȍgī		mnọ̑gi	многу	mnogu
some	*ne + *koliko		не́сколько	n'éskol'ko	де́кілька	dékil'ka	ня́колко	njákolko	několik	niekoľko	kilka	nekoliko		nekọ̑liko, nẹ́kaj	неколку	nekolku
few	*malъ		ма́ло	málo	ма́ло	málo	ма́лко	málko	málo	málo	mało	malo		malo	малку	malku
other/second	*drȗgъ	adj. o (c)	друго́й	drugój	дру́гий	drúhyj	друг (today -"other")	drug	druhý	druhý	drugi, (arch.. wtóry)	drȗg	drȕgī	drȗgi	друг (today -"other")	drug
other	*jь̀nь	prn. (a)	ино́й	inój	і́нший	ínšyj	инак	inak	jiný	iný, inakší	inny	drugi/ini		drȗg	инаку	inaku
one	*(j)edìnъ, *(j)edьnъ	num. o	оди́н, одна́	od'ín, odná	оди́н	odýn	еди́н	edín	jeden	jeden, jedna	jeden	jèdan, jȅdna	jedå̃n, jednȁ, jednȍ	eden, en, ena, eno	еден	eden
two	*d(ъ)va	num.	два	dva, dve, dva	два	dva	двa	dva	dva, dvě, dvě	dva, dve	dwa, dwie, dwa	dvȃ, dv(ȉj)e, dvȃ	dvå̑, dvȋ, dvå̑	dvȃ, dvẹ́, dvȃ	два	dva
three	*trьje, *tri	num.	три	tr'i	три	try	три	tri	tři	tri	trzy	trȋ	trȋ	trȋje, trȋ, trȋ	три	tri
four	*četỳre	num. (a)	четы́ре	č'etýr'e	чоти́ри	čotýry	че́ти́ри	čétíri	čtyři	štyri	cztery	čètiri	četȉri	štirje, štiri, štiri	четири	četiri
five	pę̑tь	num. i (c)	пять	p'at'	п’ять	pjat'	пет	pet	pět	päť	pięć	pȇt	pȇt	pẹ̑t	пет	pet
big, great	*velìkъ; velьkъ	adj. o	вели́кий	v'el'ík'ij	вели́кий	velýkyj	((голям)), вели́к	((goljam)), velík	velký	veľký	wielki	vȅlikī, vȅlikā, vȅlikō	vȅlik, velikȁ, velikȍ	vélik, velíka	голем, велики	golem, veliki
small	*màlъ	adj. o (a)	ма́лый	mályj	мали́й	malýj	(ма́лък); мал	(málǝk); mal	malý	malý	mały	mȁli	må̃lī	mȃli, majhen	малечoк/а/ки/ко, мал, мало/а/и.	malećok/a/ki/ko, mal, malo/a/i
long	*dь̀lgъ	adj. o (a)	до́лгий	dólg'ij	до́вгий	dóvhyj	дъ́лъг	dǝ́lǝg	dlouhý	dlhý	długi	dȕg	dȕg	dȏļg, dȏļga, dȏļgo	долг/долго	dolg/dolgo
short	*kortъ̀kъ	adj. o (b)	коро́ткий	korótk'ij	коро́ткий	korótkyj	кра́тък	krátǝk	krátký	krátky	krótki	krátak, krátka	krå̑tak, krå̄tkȁ, krå̑tko; krãtak, krãtka, krãtko	krátǝk	кратко/а/и, краток	kratko/a/i, kratok
wide	*širokъ		широ́кий	širók'ij	широ́кий	šyrókyj	широ́к	širók	široký	široký	szeroki	širok		širók	широк, широко/а/и	širok, široko/a/i
narrow	*ǫzъkъ	adj. o	у́зкий	úzk'ij; úzok, uzká, úzko	вузьки́й	vuz'kýj	у́зък	úzǎk	úzký	úzky	wąski	ȕzak, ȕska/uskȁ	ȕsak, uskȁ, ȕsko	ọ́zǝk, ọ́zka	тесно/на/ни/ен	tesno/na/ni/en, teško/a/i
thick	*tъlstъ		то́лстый	tólstyj	товсти́й	towstýj	тлъст	tlǝst	tlustý	tlstý, hrubý	tłusty	debeli		debel, debẹ́l, tọ̑lst	дебел, дебело/а/и	debel, debelo/a/i
thin	*tь̏nъkъ	adj. o (c)	то́нкий	tónk'ij; tónok, tanká, tónko	тонки́й	tonkýj	т'ънък	tǝ́nǝk	tenký	tenký	cienki	tȁnak, tànka/tánka	tȁnak, tankȁ, tȃnko	tǝnǝ́k, tǝnkà	тенок, тенко/а/и	tenok, tenko/a/i
heavy	*tęžъkъ	adj. o	тя́жкий	t'ážkij	тяжки́й	tjažkýj	те́жък	téžǝk	těžký	ťažký	ciężki	téžak, téška	tȅžak, tēškȁ	téžǝk téžka, téžko; težȃk	тежок, тешко/а/и	težok, teško/a/i
woman/wife	*ženà	f. ā (b)	жена́	ž'ená /žená/	дружина	družýna	жена́	žená	žena	žena, manželka	żona	žèna (acc. žènu), supruga	ženȁ (acc. ženȕ)	žéna (wife), žẹ́nska (woman)	жена	ženа
husband, man	*mǫ̑žь	m. jo (c)	муж	muž	муж	muž	мъж	mǝž	muž	muž, manžel	mąż		mȗž (mȗža)	mọ̑ž (možȃ)	маж	maž
man (human)	*čelověkъ	m. o	челове́к	č'elov'ék	чоловік	čolovík (husband)	чове́к	čovék	člověk	človek	człowiek	čòv(j)ek (čòv(j)eka); čȍv(j)ek (čov(j)èka)	čovȉk (čovȉka)	člóvek (človẹ́ka)	човек	čovek
child	*dětę		дитя́	d'it'á	дитина	dytýna	дете́	deté	dítě	dieťa	dziecko, dziecię	d(ij)ete		otrók, dẹ́te	дете	dete
mother	*mati		мать	mat'	мати	máty	ма́йка	májka	matka	matka, mama	matka (arch. mać)	majka, mater, mati		mati	мајка	majka
father	*otьcь		оте́ц	ot'éc	батько	bát'ko	оте́ц	otе́c	otec	otec	ojciec	otac		oče	татко, отец	tatko, otec
wild animal	*zvě̑rь	m. i (c)	зверь	zv'er'	звір	zvir	звяр	zvjar	zvěř	zviera, zver	zwierz, zwierzę	zv(ȉj)er f. (i)	zvȋr (zvȋri) f. (i)	zvẹ̑r (zverȋ)	ѕвер	dzver
fish	*ryba		ры́ба	rýba	риба	rýba	ри́ба	ríba	ryba	ryba	ryba	riba		riba	риба	riba
bird	*pъtica, *pъtъka		пти́ца	pt'íca	птах	ptax	пти́ца	ptíca	pták	vták	ptak	ptica		ptič, ptica	птица	ptica
dog	*pьsъ		соба́ка, пёс	sobáka, p'os	собака, пес	sobáka, pes	пес, ку́че	pes, kúče	pes	pes	pies	pas		pəs	куче, пес	kuče, pes
louse	*vъ̏šь	f. i (c)	вошь	voš' /voš/ (vš'i)	воша	vóša	въ́шка	vǝ́ška	veš	voš	wesz	vȃš (vȁši); ȗš (ȕši)		ùš (ušȋ); ȗš	вошка	voška
snake	*zmьjà	f. iā	змея́	zm'ejá	змія	zmijá	змия́	zmijá	zmije (Note: "adder")	had, zmija (venomous)	żmija (Note: "venomous snake, adder")	zmìja	zmijȁ	kača	змија	zmija
worm	*čьrvь		червь	č'erv'	черв'як	červják	че́рвей	čérvej	červ	červ	czerw, robak	crv		črv	црв	crv
tree	*dervo, *dьrvo		де́рево	d'ér'evo	дерево	dérevo	дърво́	dǝrvó	dřevo (Note: "wood (material). Tree is strom instead.")	strom, drevo (Note: "archaic- nowadays used as timber")	drzewo	drvo		drevọ̑	дрво	drvo
forest	*lěsъ		лес	l'es	ліс	lis	лес	les	les	les, hora	las	lȇs, lijȇs		gozd, lẹ́s, šuma, họ̑sta, mẹ́ja	шума	šuma
stick	*palica, *palъka		па́лка	pálka	палиця	pályc'a	пáлка	pálka	hůl	palica	laska / pałka / kij	štap, palica		palica	палка	palka
fruit	*plodъ		плод	plod	плід	plid	плод, овошка	plod, ovoška	ovoce (plod)	ovocie	owoc (płód)	plod		plọ̑d	плод	plod
seed	*sěmę		се́мя	s'ém'a	насіння	nasínn'a	се́ме	séme	semeno	semeno, semä (archaic)	nasiono/nasienie, ziarno, siemię	s(j)eme		sẹ́me	семе, семенка	seme, semenka
leaf	*listъ		лист	l'ist	лист	lyst	листо́, лист	listó, list	list	list	liść	list		list	лист	list
root	*korenь		ко́рень	kór'en'	корінь	kórin'	ко́рен	kóren	kořen	koreň	korzeń	kor(ij)en		korẹ́n, korenína	корен	koren
bark (of a tree)	*kora		кора́	korá	кора	korá	кора́	korá	kůra	kôra	kora	kora		skọ̑rja	кора	kora
flower	*květъ		цвето́к	cv'etók	квітка	kvítka	цве́те	cvéte	květ	kvet	kwiat, kwiecie	cv(ij)et		rọ̑ža, cvẹ́t, cvetlíca	цвеќе	cvekje
grass	*trava		трава́	travá	трава	travá	трева́	trevá	tráva	tráva	trawa	trava		trava	трева	treva
rope	*ǫže		верёвка	v'er'óvka	мотузка	motúzka	въже́	vǝžé	provaz, houžev	povraz, šnúra, lano	sznur, lina, powróz	uže		vrv, konópec	јаже	jaže
skin	*koža		ко́жа	kóža	шкіра	škíra	ко́жа	kóža	kůže	koža	kożuch, (Note: "sheepskin coat") skóra	koža		kọ̑ža	кожа	koža
meat	*męso		мя́со	m'áso	м'ясо	mjáso	ме́со	méso	maso	mäso	mięso	meso		mesọ̑	месо	meso
blood	*kry		кровь	krov'	кров	krov	кръв	krǝv	krev	krv	krew	krv		kri	крв	krv
bone	*kostь		кость	kost'	кістка	kístka	кост, ко́кал	kost, kókal	kost	kosť	kość, kostka(deminutive)	kost		kọ̑st	коска	koska
fat (noun)	*sadlo		са́ло	sálo	жир	žyr	сало (dial.)	salo	sádlo, tuk	tuk, sadlo	tłuszcz, sadło	masnoća, mast, salo		mast, tọ̑lšča, maščóba, salo	сало	salo
egg	*ȃje; *ajьce	n. jo (c); n. jo	яйцо́	jajcó	яйце	jajcé	яйце́	jajcé	vejce	vajce, vajco (regional)	jajo; jajko, jajco	jáje; jájce	jå̑je	jájce	јајце	jajce
horn	*rȍgъ m. o (c)		рог	rog	ріг	rih	рог	rog	roh	roh	róg (rogu)	rȏg (rȍga)		rọ̑g (rọ̑ga/rogȃ)	рог	rog
tail	*xvȍstъ		хвост	hvost	хвіст	xvist	опа́шка	opáška	chvost	chvost	chwost	rȇp		rȅp	о́пашка	ópaška
feather	*però	n. o (b)	перо́	p'eró	перо	peró	перо́	peró	péro	pero, pierko	pióro	pèro	perȍ	perọ̑ (perẹ́sa)	перо	pero
hair	*vȏlsъ	m. o (c)	во́лос	vólos (vólosa)	волосина, волосся	volosýna, volóss'a	влакнó	vlaknó	vlas	vlas	włos, kosmyk (Note: "tuft of hair")	vlȃs (vlȃsa)	vlå̑s (vlå̑sa)	lȃs (lȃsa/lasȗ)	влакно	vlakno
hair, braided hair	*kosà	f. ā (c)		kosá (kósu) (Note: "braid, plait")	коса	kosá	коса́	kosá	vlasy OCz. kosa	vlasy, vrkoče OSk. kosa	OPl. kosa (Note: "braid, mane")	kòsa (acc. kȍsu)	(Novi) kosȁ (acc. kosȕ/kȍsu)	lasjẹ́	косa	kosa
head	*golvà	f. ā (c)	голова́	golová (acc. gólovu)	голова	holová	глава́	glavá	hlava	hlava	głowa	gláva (acc. glȃvu)	glå̄vȁ (acc. glå̑vu)	gláva	глава	glava
ear	*ȗxo	n. o (c)	у́хо	úxo, pl. úš'i /úšy/	вухо	vúxo	ухо́	uhó	ucho	ucho	ucho	ȕho/ȕvo, pl. f. ȕši	ȕho (ȕha), pl. m. ȕši	uhọ̑ (ušẹ̑sa)	уво, уше	uvo, uše
eye	*ȍko	n. o (c)	глаз, о́ко	óko (poet.)	око	о́ko	око́	okó	oko			ȍko		okọ̑ (očẹ̑sa)	око	oko
nose	*nȍsъ	m. o (c)	нос	nos	ніс	nis	нос	nos	nos			nȏs (nȍsa)		nọ̑s (nọ̑sa/nosȃ/nosȗ)	нос	nos
mouth	*ūstà	pl. n. o (b)	рот	rot	вуста	vustá	уста́	ustá	ústa		usta	ústa	ũstå̄; ũsta	ústa	уста	usta
tooth	*zǫ̑bъ	m. o (c)	зуб	zub	зуб	zub	зъб	zǝb	zub	zub	ząb	zȗb (zȗba)		zọ̑b (zọ̑ba)	заб	zab
tongue/language	*ęzỳkъ	m. o (a)	язы́к	jazýk	язик, мова	jazýk, móva	ези́к	ezík	jazyk	jazyk	język	jèzik	jazȉk	jézik (jezíka)	јазик	jazik
nail (of finger/toe), claw	*nȍgъtь	m. i/io (c)	но́готь	nógot' (nógt'a)	ніготь	níhot'	но́кът	nókǝt	nehet	necht	paznokieć (OPl. paznogiedź), pazur	nȍkat (nȍkta); nogat (nokta)	nȍhat (nȍhta)	nọ̑ht (nọ̑hta)	нокт, канџа	nokt, kandža
foot, leg	*noga	f. ā (c)	нога́	nogá	ногá	nohá	крак, нога	krak, nogá	noha	noha	noga	nòga (nȍgu)	nogȁ (nȍgu)	nóga	нога	noga
knee	*kolě̀no	n. o (a)	коле́но	kol'éno	коліно	kolíno	коля́но	kolyáno	koleno	koleno	kolano	kòl(j)eno	kolȉno	kolẹ́no	колено/ница	koleno/nica
hand	*rǭkà	f. ā (c)	рука́	ruká	рука	ruká	ръка́	rǝká	ruka	ruka	ręka	rúka (rȗku)	rūkȁ (rȗku)	róka	рака	raka
wing	*krīdlò	n. o (b)	крыло́	kryló	крило	kryló	крило́	kriló	křídlo	krídlo	skrzydło	krílo	(Orb.) krīlȍ	krílo	крило	krilo
belly	*bŗȗxo, *bŗȗxъ	m./n. o (c)	живот	žyvot	живіт	žyvít	корем, стомах, търбух	korem, stomah, tǝrbuh	břicho	brucho	brzuch	trbuh	---	trẹ́buh (trebúha)	стомак, желудник	stomak, želudnik
guts	*červo		кишки́	k'išk'í	кишки́	kyšký	черва́	červá	střeva	črevá	trzewia (ścierwo (Note: "carcass"))	cr(ij)evo		črevo, črevẹ́sje	црева	creva
neck	*šija, *šьja		ше́я	š'éja /šéja/	шия	šýja	врат, ши́я	vrat, šíja	krk	krk	szyja, kark	vrat, šija		vrat	шија	šija
back	*xrьbьtъ		спина́	spiná	спи́на	spýna	гръб	grǝb	záda, hřbet	chbát	grzbiet	leđa		hrbet	грб	grb
shoulder	*pletjè	n. jo (b)	плечó	plečó	плече	plečé	плещи (pl.)	pleští pl.	rameno, pleco	plece, rameno	plecy pl., (Note: "back") ramię (Note: "arm(limb)")	pléće, rame	(Novi) plećȅ	rama, plẹ́ča	плеќи	plékji
breast	*grǫ̑dь	f. i (c)	грудь	grud'	груди	hrúdy	гръд	grǝd	prsa, hruď	prsia, hruď	pierś; OPl. grędzi (pl.)	grȗd, prsa		prsi, grudi, nẹ́drje	града	grada
heart	*sь̏rdьce	n. jo (c)	се́рдце	s'érdc'e /s'érce/	серце	sérce	сърце́	sǝrcé	srdce	srdce	serce (OPl. serdce)	sȑce (sȑca)		srcẹ̑ (srcá)	срце	srce
liver	*ę̄trò, *pečenь	n. o (b)		játro/jatró (Note: "entrails, eggs")	печінка	pečínka	черен дроб, джигер	cheren drob, džiger	játra (pl.)	pečeň	(wątroba)	jȅtra (pl.)	(Orb.) j^{i}ẽtra (pl.)	jẹ́tra (pl.)	џигер, црн дроб	džiger, crn drob
to drink	*pìti	v.	пить	p'it'	пити	pýty	да пи́я	da píja	píti	piť	pić	pȉti (pȉjēm)	pȉti (pījȅš)	píti (píjem)	да пие	da pie
to eat	*ě̀sti	v.	есть	jest'	їсти	jísty	да ям	da jam	jísti	jesť	jeść	jȅsti (jȅdem)	ȉsti/ĩsti (3sg. idẽ)	jẹ́sti (jẹ́m)	да јаде	da jade
to gnaw	*grỳzti	v. (c)	грызть	gryzt'	гризти	hrýzty	да гризя	da grize	hryzat	hrýzť	gryźć	grȉsti (grízēm)	grȉsti (2sg. grīzȅš)	grísti (grízem)	да гризе	da grize
to suck	*sъsàti	v.	соса́ть	sosát' (sosú, sos'ót)	смоктати	smoktáty	(су́ча)	(súča)	sát (saji)	cicať, sať	ssać (ssę)	sisati		sesáti (sesȃm)	да цица	da cica
to spit	*pjь̀vati	v. (a)	плева́ть	pl'evát' (pljujú, plujót)	плювати	pl'uváty	плю́я	pljúja; pljúvam	plivat (plivu)	pľuť (pľujem)	pluć (pluję), (arch. plwać)	pljùvati (pljȕjēm)		pljúvati (pljúvam)	да плука	da pluka
to vomit	*bljьvàti	v.	блева́ть	bl'evát'	блювати	bl'uváty	повръщам, бълвам	povrǝ́shtam, bǝ́lvam	blít (bliju)	zvracať, OSk. bľuť, bľuvať	wymiotować, zwracać, rzygać; OPl. bluć (bluj̨ę)	bljùvati (bljȕjēm), povraćati	(Orb.) bljȕvat (3sg. bljȗje/bljȕva)	brùhati, bljuváti (bljúvam/bljújem)	да повраќа	da povrakja
to blow	*dǫ̀ti	v.	дуть, ве́ять	dut', v'éjat'	ду́ти, ві́яти, дму́хати	dúty, víjaty, dmúxaty	ду́хам, ве́я	dúham, véja	vát, vanout, foukat	duť, fúkať, vanúť	dmuchać, dąć, wiać	dúvati, dúhati		pihati	да дува	da duva
to breathe	*dyxati	v.	дышать	dyshat'	дихати	dýxaty	ди́шам	díšam	dýchat (dýchám)	dýchať (dýcham)	oddychać; dychać (colloq.), dyszeć (Note: "pant, gasp")	dísati (dȋšēm/dȋhām)	dȉhati (2sg. dȉšeš)	díhati (dȋham)	да дише	da diše
to laugh	*smьjàti sę	v. (c)	смея́ться	sm'eját's'a	сміятись	smijátys'	сме́я се	sméja se	smát se (směju se)	smiať sa (smejem sa)	śmiać się (śmieję się)	smìjati se (smìjēm se)	(Vrg.) smījȁti se (smijȅš se)	smejáti se (smẹ́jem se/smejím se)	да се смее	da se smee
to see	*vìděti	v. (a)	ви́деть	v'íd'et'	бачити	báčyty	ви́ждам	vídja, víždam	vidět (vidím)	vidieť (vidím)	widzieć	vȉd(j)eti (vȉdīm)	vìti (2sg. vȉdīš)	vídeti (vȋdim)	да види	da vidi
to hear	*slušati		слу́шать	slúšat'	слухати	slúxaty	слу́шам, чу́вам	slúšam, čúvam	slyšet (slyším)	počuť (počujem)	słyszeć	slušati		slišati (slišim)	да слушне	da slušne
to know, be familiar with	*znàti	v. (a)	знать	znat'	знати	znáty	зна́я; знам	znája; znam	znát (znám)	vedieť, poznať	znać	znȁti (znȃm)	znȁti (2sg. znå̑š)	poznáti (poznȃm)	да знае, да познава	da znae, da poznava
to know, have knowledge	*věděti	v.	ведать	v'édat' (Note: "manage"; "know" (obs.))	відати	vídaty	вям	vjam	vědět (vím)	vedieť (viem)	wiedzieć (wiem)	znati		vẹ́deti (vẹ́m)		
to understand	*orzuměti	v.	понимать	ponimatʹ	розуміти	rozumíty	разбирам	razbiram	rozumět (rozumím)	rozumieť (rozumiem)	rozumieć (rozumiem)	razùm(j)eti		razumẹ́ti	да разбира	da razbira
to think	*mysliti		мы́слить	mýsl'it'	думати, мислити	dúmaty, mýslyty	ми́сля	míslja	myslet (myslím)	myslieť (myslím)	myśleć	misliti		misliti (mislim)	да мисли	da misli
to smell	*ňuxati		ню́хать, чу́ять	n'úkhat', čújat'	нюхати, відчувати	n'úxaty, vidčuváty	мири́ша, ду́ша	miríša, dúša	vonět (voním), čichat (čichám)	voniať (voniam), čuchať (čuchám)	czuć, wąchać, (Note: "to smell", transitive) wonieć (Note: "to smell, intransitive")	mirisati		vọ̑hati, vọ̑njati, duhati	да мирисне	da mirisne
to fear	*bojati sę		боя́ться	boját's'a	боятись	bojátys'	страху́вам се, боя се	straxúvam se, boja se	bát se	báť sa (bojím sa)	bać się (boję się), płoszyć się, strachać się(arch.), lękać się	bojati se		bati se	да се плаши	da se plaši
to sleep	*sъpati		спать	spat'	спати	spáty	спя	spja	spát	spať	spać	spavati		spati	да спие	da spie
to live	*žìti	v. (c)	жить	ž'it' /žyt'/	жити	žúty	живе́я	živéja	žít	žiť	żyć	žív(j)eti, 1sg. žívīm	žīvȉti, 2sg. žīvȅš	živẹ́ti	да живее	da živee
to die	*merti		умира́ть	um'irát'	вмирати	vmyráty	уми́рам	umíram	umírat	umierať, zomierať	umierać, mrzeć	umr(ij)eti, umriti		umrẹ́ti	да умре	da umre
to kill	*ubiti		убива́ть	ub'ivát'	вбивати	vbyváty	уби́вам	ubívam	zabíjet	zabíjať, zabiť	zabijać, ubijać	ubiti		ubíti	да убие	da ubie
to fight	*boriti sę		боро́ться	borót's'a	боротись	borótys'	бо́ря се, би́я се	bórja se, bíja se	bojovat	bojovať, biť sa	walczyć, bić się, wojować, zmagać się	boriti se, tući se		boríti se, bojeváti se	да се бори, да се тепа	da se bori, da se tepa
to hunt	*loviti		охо́титься	oxót'it's'a	полювати	pol'uváty	лову́вам, ловя	lovúvam, lovja	lovit	loviť	polować, (Note: "hunt, chase, prowl, course") łowić (Note: "hunt, fish, catch, snare")	loviti		lovíti	да лови	da lovi
to hit	*udariti	v.	ударя́ть	udar'át'	вдаряти	vdar'áty	у́дрям	údrjam	udeřit	udrieť	uderzać	ùdariti, 1sg. ùdarīm		udáriti	да удри	da udri
to cut	*sěkti, *strigti, *rězati		ре́зать, руби́ть	r'ézat', rub'ít'	секти, стригти, різати	sektý, strýhty, rízaty	ре́жа, сека́	réža, seká	řezat	rezať, sekať, rúbať	ciąć, (Note: "cut, slice, chop") strzyc, (Note: "cut, mow, trim, shear") siec OPl. rzezać (arch.)	rezati		rẹ́zati	да сече	da seće
to split			разделя́ть	razd'el'át'	розділяти	rozdil'áty	разде́лям	razdéljam	rozdělit	rozdeliť (sa)	podzielić, (Note: "split, divide, separate, share, distribute") rozdzielić (Note: "split (up), (divide up), disunite, pull apart, separate, parcel, give away, share, distribute, provide, disperse")	pod(ij)eliti, razd(ij)eliti		razdelíti	да подели, да раздели	da podeli, da razdeli
to stab	*bosti, *kolti		коло́ть	kolót'	колоти	kolóty	буча́, прому́швам, пробо́ждам	bučá, promúšvam, probóždam	píchnout	pichnúť. bodnúť	pchnąć, (Note: "push") bóść (Note: "stab, spike, prick, butt") (coll. kolnąć)	bosti, ubosti, klati		zabósti, prebósti	да убоде	da ubode
to scratch	*česati, *drapati		цара́пать	carápat'	чесати, дерти	česáty, dérty	че́ша, дра́скам	čéša, dráskam	škrábat	škrabať, škrabnúť	drapać, (Note: "scratch, scrape, irritate, rub") skrobać, (Note: "scratch, scrape, rasp, scrub, grate, scribble") czesać, (Note: "comb, brush") grzebać (Note: "to rummage, to dig")	češati, grebati, drapati		praskati	да гребе, драска, чеша, драпа	da grebe, draska, ćeša, drapa
to dig	*kopati		копа́ть	kopát'	копати	kopáty	копа́я	kopája	kopat	kopať	kopać	kopati		kopáti	да копа	da kopa
to sail	*pluti; *plỳti	v.; v. (a)	плыть	plyt' (plyvú, plyv'ót)	плити	plyty	плу́вам	plúvam	plout (pluju)	plaviť sa, plávať	(pływać), pluć (Note: "spit, sputter")	ploviti		plúti (plújem/plóvem)	да плива, да едри	da pliva, da edri
to swim, float	*plàvati	v. (a)	пла́вать	plávat'	плавати	plávaty	пла́вам	plávam	plavat	plávať	pływać, pławić się, (Note: "wallow") OPl. pławać	plȉvati		plávati (plȃvam)	да плива, да едри	da pliva, da edri
to fly	*letěti		лета́ть	l'etát'	літати	litáty	летя́	letjá	létat	lietať, letieť	latać, lecieć	let(j)eti		letẹ́ti (letím)	да лета	da leta
to walk	*xoditi	v.	ходи́ть	xod'ít'	ходити	xodýty	хо́дя	xódja	chodit	chodiť, kráčať	chodzić	hòdati	hodȉti	hodíti (hǫ́dim)	да оди	da odi
to go	*jьti	v.	идти́	idt'í (idú, id'ót)	йти	jty	вървя, отивам	vǝ́rvja, otivam	jít (jdu)	ísť (idem)	iść (idę)	ìći (ȉdēm)		íti (grem)	да замине	da замине
to come			приходи́ть	pr'ixod'ít'	приходити	pryxódyty	и́двам, ида, дохождам	ídvam, ida, dohoždam	přicházet, přijít	prichádzať, prísť	przychodzić, przyjść, dojść	doći, prići		priti	да дојде	da dojde
to lie (as in a bed)	*ležati		лежа́ть	l'ežát'	лежати	ležáty	лежа́	ležá	ležet	ležať	leżeć	ležati, lijegati		ležáti (ležím)	лежам	ležam
to sit	*sěsti		сиде́ть	s'id'ét'	сидіти	sydíty	седя́	sedjá	sedět	sedieť	siedzieć	s(j)esti		sedẹ́ti (sedím)	да седне	da sedne
to stand	*stati		стоя́ть	stoját'	стояти	stojáty	стоя́, ставам	stojá, stavam	stát	stáť	stać, stawać, stojeć(arch./dial.)	stati, stajati		vstáti	да стане	da stane
to turn	*vьrtě̀ti	v. (c)	верте́ть	v'ert'ét'	крутити	krutýty	въртя́	vǝrtjá	vrtět	obracať, zvrtnúť sa	(obracać), wiercić	vŕt(j)eti (vŕtīm)	vrtȉti (2sg. vrtĩš)	vrtẹ́ti (vrtím)	да врти, да заврти	da vrti, da zavrti
to turn, return	*vortìti	v. (b)	вернуть	vernut'	повернути, вертати	povernúty, vertáty	връщам	vrǝshtam	vrátit	vrátiť sa	wrócić	vrátiti (1sg. vrȃtīm)	vrå̄tȉti (2sg. vrå̃tīš)	vrníti	да се врати	da se vrati
to fall	*pasti		па́дать	pádat'	падати	pádaty	па́дам	pádam	padat	padať, padnúť	spadać/padać, paść/spaść	pasti		pasti	да падне	da padne
to give	*dati		дава́ть	davát'	дава́ти	daváty	да́вам	dávam	dávat	dávať, dať	dawać, dać	dati		dati	да даде	da dade
to hold	*dьržati		держа́ть	d'eržát'	тримати	trymáty	държа́	dǝržá	držet	držať	trzymać, dzierżyć	držati		držáti (držím)	да држи	da drži
to squeeze	*tiskati; *žęti	v. (b)	сжима́ть	sž'imát'	стиска́ти	styskáty	сти́скам, ма́чкам	stískam, máčkam	mačkat	stískať, mädliť	ściskać, wyżymać (Note: "to squeeze(mainly clothes)from water")	stiskati		stiskati	да стеска, да стега	da steska, da stega
to rub	*terti		тере́ть	t'er'ét'	терти	térty	три́я, тъ́ркам	tríja, tǝ́rkam	třít	trieť, šúchať	trzeć	trljati		drgniti, trẹ́ti	да трие	da trie
to wash	*myti		мыть	myt'	мити	mýty	ми́я, пера́	míja, perá	mýt	umývať, myť	myć, prać (Note: "to wash clothes")	oprati, umiti		umíti, opráti	да мие, да пере	da mie, da pere
to wipe			вытира́ть	vyt'irát'	витирати	vytyráty	бъ́рша, три́я	bǝ́rša, tríja	vytírat	utierať, (u)trieť	wycierać, otrzeć	obrisati, brisati		brisati, otrẹ́ti	да бриши	da briši
to pull	*tęgnǫti		тяну́ть	t'anút'	тягти	t'ahtý	дъ́рпам, те́гля, вла́ча	dǝ́rpam, téglja, vláča	táhnout	ťahať	ciągnąć, wlec (Note: "to drag")	potegnuti, vući		vlẹ́či, potegníti	да влече, да тегне	da vleće, da tegne
to push	*perti		толка́ть	tolkát'	штовха́ти	štovxáty	нати́скам, бу́там	natískam, bútam	tlačit	tlačiť	pchać, wcisnąć, (Note: "to push f.ex. a button") tłoczyć (Note: "to push f.ex. steam")	gurnuti		potisniti, poriniti	да турка	da turka
to throw	*kydati, *mesti, *vergti v.		броса́ть, кида́ть	brosát', k'idát'	кидати	kýdaty	хвъ́рлям	xvǝ́rljam	házet; OCz. vrci (1sg. vrhu)	hádzať	rzucać, miotać	|v^{e}ȑć, 2sg. v^{e}ȑžeš	vrẹ́či	да фрли	da frli	
to tie	*vę̄zàti	v. (b)	вяза́ть	v'azát'	в'яза́ти	v'jazáty	връ́звам	vrǝ́zvam	vázat	viazať	wiązać	vézati, 1sg. véžēm	vēzȁti, 2sg. vēžeš	vẹ́zati	да врзе	da vrze
to sew	*šiti		шить	šyt'	ши́ти	šýty	ши́я	šíja	šít	šiť	szyć	šiti		sejati	да сошие	da sošie
to count	*čitati	v.	счита́ть, посчита́ть	sč'itátʹ, posč'itátʹ	рахува́ти, лічи́ти	raxuváty, ličýty	бро́я	brója	počítat	počítať	liczyć	bròjati		šteti	да брои	da broi
to read	*čitati	v.	чита́ть	č'itát'	чита́ти	čytáty	чета	cheta	číst (čtu)	čítať	czytać	čìtati (čìtām)	čȉtati (2sg. čȉtå̄š)	brati (berem), čítati (čítam)	да чита, да рачуна	da čita, da računa
to speak, talk	*govorìti	v.	говори́ть	govor'ít'	говори́ти	hovorýty	говоря	govórja	mluvit, hovořit	hovoriť	rozmawiać, mówić, gwarzyć OPl. goworzyć; gaworzyć (Note: "babble, coo")	govòriti (gòvorīm)	govȍrīti (2sg. govȍrīš)	govoríti (govorím)	да говори, да зборува	da govori, da zboruva
to say, tell	*kāzàti	v.	говори́ть, сказа́ть	govor'ít', skazat'	каза́ти	kazáty	ка́жа	káža	hovořit, říkat	povedať, hovoriť	powiedzieć	kázati (kȃžēm)	kå̄zȁti (2sg. kå̃žeš)	reči	да кажува	da kažuva
to show	*kāzàti	v.	показывать	pokazyvat'	пока́зувати	pokázuvaty	показвам	pokazvam	ukázat	ukázať	pokazać	kázati (kȃžēm)	kå̄zȁti (2sg. kå̃žeš)	kázati (kážem)	да покаже	da pokaže
to sing	*pěti	v. (c)	петь	p'et' (pojú, pojót)	співа́ти	spiváty	пе́я	péja (2sg. péeš)	zpívat (zpívám), pět (pěji)	spievať	śpiewać (śpiewam), piać (pieję) (Note: "to crow, to sound like a rooster")	p(j)evati		pẹ́ti (pójem)	да пее	da pee
to play	*jьgrati		игра́ть	igrát'	гра́ти	hráty	игра́я	igrája	hrát	hrať	grać, igrać	igrati		igráti, igráti se	да игра	da igra
can, to be able to	*mogti		мочь	moč'	могти	mohtý	мога́, мо́же	mogá, móže	moci, moct	môcť	móc	mȍći		móči	да може	da može
to flow	*tekti		течь	t'eč'	текти	tektý	тека́, те́че	teká, téče	téci, téct	tiecť	ciec, cieknąć	teći		teči	да тече	da teče
to freeze	*mьrznǫti		замерзáть	zam'erzát'	замерзáти	zamerzáty	замръ́звам	zamrǝ́zvam	zamrznout	mrznúť, zmrznúť, zamrznúť	marznąć, zamarzać	mrznuti, zamrznuti		zamrzniti	да замрзне	da zamrzne
to swell	*puxnǫti		пу́хнуть	púxnut'	пу́хнути	púxnuty	подпу́хвам, оти́чам, поду́вам се	podpúxvam, otíčam, podúvam se	opuchnout, otéct	puchnúť, opuchnúť, (arch.) otiecť	puchnąć, rozdąć (się)	oteknuti, oteći		oteči	да потечи	da poteči
sun	*sъlnьce		со́лнце	sólnc'e /sónce/	со́нце	sónce	слъ́нце	slǝ́nce	slunce	slnko, (arch.) slnce	słońce	sunce		sọ̑nce	сонце	sonce
moon	*luna, *měsęcь		луна́, ме́сяц	luná, m'és'ac	місяць	mís'ac'	луна́, месец, месечина	luná, mesec, mesečina	měsíc	mesiac, (poet.) luna	księżyc, OPl. miesiąc	m(j)esec		mẹ́sec	месечина	mesečina
star	*gvězda		звезда́	zv'ezdá	зірка	zírka	звезда́	zvezdá	hvězda	hviezda	gwiazda	zv(ij)ezda		zvẹ́zda	ѕвезда	dzvezda
water	*vodà	f. ā (c)	вода́	vodá (acc. vódu)	вода́	vodá	вода́	vodá	voda	voda	woda	vòda (acc. vȍdu)	vodȁ (acc. vȍdu)	vóda	вода	voda
rain	*dъždь		дождь	dožd' /došš', došt'/	дощ	došč	дъжд	dǝžd	déšť	dážď	deszcz, OPl. deżdż (gen. deszczu/dżdżu)	kiša, dažd		dǝž	дожд	dožd
river	*rěka		река́	r'eká	рі́чка	ríčka	река́	reká	řeka	rieka	rzeka	r(ij)eka		rẹ́ka	река	reka
lake	*(j)ezero		о́зеро	óz'ero	о́зеро	ózero	е́зеро	ézero	jezero	jazero	jezioro	jezero		jẹ́zero	езеро	ezero
sea	*more, *morě		мо́ре	mór'e	мо́ре	móre	море́	moré	moře	more	morze	more		mọ̑rje	море	more
salt	*solь		соль	sol'	сіль	sil'	сол	sol	sůl	soľ	sól	so(l)		sọ̑l	сол	sol
stone	*kamy		ка́мень	kám'en'	ка́мінь	kámin'	ка́мък, камъни (pl.)	kámǝk, kamǝni (pl.)	kámen	kameň	kamień (dim. kamyk)	kamen		kamen	камен	kamen
sand	*pěsъkъ		песо́к	p'esók	пісо́к	pisók	пя́сък	pjásǝk	písek	piesok	piasek	p(ij)esak		pẹ́sek	песок	pesok
dust	*porxъ		пыль	pyl'	пил	pyl	прах	prax	prach	prach	pył, kurz, proch	prašina, prah		prah	прав, прашина	prav, prašina
earth	*zemľà	f. jā (b/c)	земля́	z'eml'á	земля́	zeml'á	земя́	zemjá	země	zem, zemina	ziemia	zèmlja (acc. zȅmlju)	zemļȁ (acc. zȅmļu)	zémlja	земја	zemja
way	*pǫ̃tь	m. i (b)	путь	put'	шлях	šl'ax	път	pǝt	pouť (fem.) (Note: "pilgrimage, journey")	cesta, púť	droga, (arch. pątnik (Note: "pilgrim")) OPl. pąć	pȗt (púta)	pũt (pũta)	pǫ́t	пат	pat
mountain	*gorà	fem. ā (c)	гора́	gorá	гора́	horá	гора́, планина	gorá, (Note: "woods") planina	hora	hora	góra	gòra (gȍru), planina	gorȁ (gȍru)	góra	гора, планина	gora, planina
cloud	*tǫča		ту́ча, о́блако	túča, óblako	хмара	xmára	о́блак	óblak	oblak	oblak, mrak	chmura, obłok	oblak		oblák	облак	oblak
fog	*mьglà		мгла, туман	mgla, tuman	імла, туман, мряковина	imlá, tumán, mr'ákovyna	мъгла́	mǝglá	mlha	hmla	mgła	magla		megla	магла	magla
sky	*nȅbo		не́бо	n'ebo	не́бо	nébo	небе́	nebé	nebe	nebo	niebo	nebo		nebọ̑	небо	nebo
wind	*vě̀trъ	m. o (a)	ве́тер	v'ét'er	вітер	víter	вя́тър	vjátǝr	vítr	vietor	wiatr	v(j)ȅtar (v(j)ȅtra)	vȉtar (vȉtra)	vệtǝr	ветер	veter
snow	*sněgъ		снег	sn'eg	сніг	snih	сняг	snjag	sníh	sneh	śnieg	sn(ij)eg		snẹ́g	снег	sneg
frost	*mòrzъ		моро́з	moróz	моро́з	moróz	мраз	mraz	mráz	mráz	mróz	mrȁz		mrȁz	мраз	mraz
ice	*ledъ		лёд	l'od	лід	lid	лед	led	led	ľad	lód	led		lẹ́d	лед	led
smoke	*dymъ		дым	dym	дим	dym	дим, пу́шек	dim, púšek	dým	dym	dym	dim		dim	чад, дим	čad, dim
fire	*ognь		ого́нь	ogón'	вого́нь	vohón'	о́гън	ógǝn	oheň	oheň	ogień (ognia)	vatra, oganj		ogenj	оган	ogan
ash	*pepelъ		пе́пел	p'ép'el	попіл	pópil	пе́пел	pépel	popel	popol	popiół	pepeo		pepẹ́l	пепел	pepel
to burn	*gorěti, *paliti		горе́ть	gor'ét'	горіти	horíty	горя́, паля́	gorjá, paljá	hořet	horieť	palić, arch. gorzeć	goreti/goriti		gorẹ́ti	да гори	da gori
(dark) red	*čьrmьnъ	adj. o		č'er'emnój/č'er'ómnyj (dial.) (Note: "red-haired, ginger")	червоний	červónyj	червено	červeno	(arch.) čermný/črmný (Kott)	čermák (person with a red-brown face, hair)	(dial. czermny)	crveno		črmljen	црвено	crveno
(bright) red	*čьrv(j)enъ	adj. o		č'er'evl'onyj (obs.) (Note: "dark red")	червоний	červónyj	черве́н	červén	červený	červený	czerwony, czerwień	cr̀ven		rdeč	црвен/но/на/ни	crven/no/na/ni
green	*zelènъ	adj. o (b)	зелёный	z'el'ónyj	зелений	zelényj	зеле́н	zelén	zelený	zelený	zielony, zieleń	zèlen, zelèna, zelèno	zelẽn, zelenȁ, zelenȍ	zelèn, zeléna	зелен/но/на/ни	zelen/no/na/ni
yellow	*žьltъ	adj. o	жёлтый	žóltyj	жовтий	žóvtyj	жълт	žǝlt	žlutý	žltý	żółty, żółć, żółcień	žȗt, f. žúta	žȗt, f. žūtȁ, n. žȗto	rumén, žȏłt, žółta	жолт/то/та/ти	żolt/то/та/ти
white	*bělъ		бе́лый	b'élyj	білий	bílyj	бял	bjal	bílý	biely	biały, biel	b(ij)eli		bẹ́l	бел/о/а/и	bel/о/а/и
black	*čьrnъ		чёрный	č'órnyj	чорний	čórnyj	че́рен	čéren	černý	ťierny	czarny, czerń	crn		črn	црн/о/а/и	crn/о/а/и
night	*noktь		ночь	noč'	ніч	nič	нощ	nošt	noc	noc	noc	noć		nọ̑č	ноќ	nokj
day	*dьnь		день	d'en'	день	den'	ден	den	den	deň	dzień	dan (dana)		dan (dnẹ́, dnẹ́va)	ден	den
year	*godъ, *rokъ		год	god	рік	rik	годи́на	godína	rok	rok	rok(pl.lata), godzina (Note: "hour")	godina		lẹ́to	година	godina
warm	*teplъ, *toplъ		тёплый	t'óplyj	теплий	téplyj	то́пло	tóplo	teplý	teplý	ciepły	topao		toplo	топло	toplo
cool, cold	*xoldьnъ	adj. o (c)	холо́дный	xolódnyj	холо́дний	xolódnyj	хла́д/ен(но/на/ни), студен(о/а/и)	xlád/en (no/na/ni), studen(o/a/i)	chladný	chladný, studený	chłodny	hládan	hlå̑dan	hládǝn	ладно	ladno
full	*pьlnъ		по́лный	pólnyj	по́вний	póvnyj	пъ́лен	pǝ́len	plný	plný	pełny, pełen	pun		pọ̑łn	полн	poln
new	*novъ		но́вый	nóvyj	новий	novýj	нов	nov	nový	novy	nowy	nov		nov	нов	nov
old	*starъ		ста́рый	stáryj	старий	starýj	стар	star	starý	starý	stary	star		star	стар	star
good	*dobrъ		хоро́ший, добрый	xoróš'ij, dobryj	добрий	dóbryj	добъ́р	dobǝ́r	dobrý	dobrý	dobry	dobar		dọ̑ber	добар, добро	dobar, dobro
bad	*zъlъ	adj. o	злой	zloj	злий, поганий	zlyj, pohányj	лош, зъл	loš, зǝ́л	zlý	zlý	zły	loš, zȁo, zlȁ, zlȍ		zli, zlà, zlo	лош, зол, зла	loš, zol, zla
rotten	*gnjilъ		гнило́й	gn'ilój	гнилий	hnylýj	гнил	gnil	shnilý	zhnitý	zgniły	truo, gnjilo		gnil	гнил	gnil
dirty			гря́зный	gr'áznyj	брудний	brudnýj	мръ́сен	mrǝ́sen	špinavý	špinavý	brudny	prljav		umázan	валкано	valkan
straight	*prostъ, *pravъ		прямо́й	pr'amój	прямий	pr'amýj	прав	prav	přímý	priamy, rovný	prosty; prawy, (Note: "righteous") równy (Note: "even")	prav		raven	прав, рамен	prav, ramen
round	*krǫglъ		кру́глый	krúglyj	круглий	krúhlyj	кръ́гъл	krǝ́gǝl	kulatý / okrouhlý	okrúhly	krągły/okrągły	okrugao		okrọ̑gel	кружно, округло	kružno, okruglo
sharp	*ostrъ		о́стрый	óstryj	го́стрий	hóstryj	о́стър	óstǝr	ostrý	ostrý	ostry	oštar		ọ̑stǝr	остро	ostro
dull	*tǫpъ		тупо́й	tupój	тупий	typýj	тъп	tup	tupý	tupý	tępy	tup		tọ̑p	тапо	tapo
smooth	*gladъkъ		гла́дкий, ро́вный	gládk'ij, róvnyj	гладкий, плавний	hládkyj, plávnyj	гла́дък, ра́вен	gládǝk, ráven	hladký	hladký	gładki	gladak		gladek	мазно	mazno
wet	*mokrъ		мо́крый	mókryj	мо́крий	mókryj	мо́кър	mókǝr	mokrý	mokrý	mokry	mokar		mọ̑ker	мокро	mokro
dry	*suxъ		сухо́й	suxój	сухий	suxýj	сух	sux	suchý	suchý	suchy	suh/suv		suh	суво	suvo
correct			пра́вильный	práv'il'nyj	пра́вильний, вірний	právyl'nyj, vírnyj	пра́вилен	právilen	správný	správny	poprawny, właściwy, prawilny(slang)	pravilan		pravílen	правилно, точно	pravilno, točno
right	*pravъ		пра́вый	právyj	правий	právyj	де́сен	désen	pravý	pravý	prawy	desni		dẹ́sǝn	десно	desno
left	*lěvъ		ле́вый	lévyj	лі́вий	l'ívyj	ляв	ljav	levý	ľavý	lewy	l(ij)evi		lẹ́vi	лево	levo
far	*dalekъ		далёкий	dal'ók'ij	далекий	dalékyj	дале́чен	daléčen	daleký	ďaleký	daleki	dalek		daleč, daljen	далеку	daleku
near	*blizъ		бли́зкий	bl'ízk'ij	близький	blyz'kýj	бли́зък	blízǝk	blízký	blízky	bliski	blizak		blizu	близу, блиско	blizu, blisko
at	*pri, *u	prep./pref.	при, у	pr'i, u	при, на, в	pry, na, v	при, у, на	pri, u, na	při, u	pri, na	przy, u	u; u-		pri	кaj	kaj
on	*na	prep.	на	na	на	na	на	na	při, u	pri, na	na	na		na		
in(to)	*vъ(n)	prep.	в	v; vn-	у, в, ув (dialectal)	u, v, uv(dialectical)	в(във)	v(vǝv)	v; v(n)-	v/vo, do	w(e); wn-	u; va-		v	в	v
with	*sъ(n)		с	s	з, із, зо/зі	z, iz, zo/zi	с(със)	s(sǝs)	s	s, so	z	s(a)		s, z	со	so
and	(j)ь, *a		и, а	i, a	і, й, та, а ("but")	i, j, ta, a	и, а	i, a	a, i	a, i	i, a	i, a		in, pa	и, а	i, a
if	*(j)ako		е́сли	jésl'i	як, якщо́, коли	jam, jakščó, kolý	ако́	akó	jestli	ak	jeśli, jeżeli, jak(coll.)	ako, ukoliko		če, ko	ако	ako
because	*dělja, *dьlja, děljьma		потому́ что	potomú čto /što/	бо, тому що, для (archaic "because of")	bo, tomú ščo, dl'a	защо́то	zaštóto	protože	pretože	bo, dlatego że, ponieważ, za to, (Note: "for that") temu, że(coll. or dial.), przeto, że(arch.	zato (što, jer)		zatọ̑, zatọ̑ ker	затоа што, зашто	zatoa što, zašto
name	*(j)ьmę		и́мя	ím'a	ім'я	im'á	и́ме	íme	jméno	meno	imię, arch. miano	ime		imẹ́	име	ime

== Conventions in the table ==
- Common Slavic accents follow Chakavian conventions: ã (long rising), à (short rising), ȃ (long falling), ȁ (short falling), ā (length in unstressed syllable).
- The accent pattern (a, b or c) of Common Slavic nouns, verbs and adjectives is indicated. These patterns are as follows: a = consistent root accent; b = predominant suffix accent; c = mobile accent.
- Nouns are given in the nominative singular; a form in parentheses is genitive singular except as indicated (acc. = accusative singular, pl. = nominative plural).
- Verbs are given in the infinitive (but the first singular present in Bulgarian, which has no infinitives). A form in parentheses is first singular present except as indicated (2sg. = second singular, 3sg. = third singular). A second form in parentheses is third singular present.
- When multiple forms of an adjective are given, the order is masculine, feminine, neuter.
- Chakavian forms are given in the Vrgada dialect except as indicated (Novi = Novi dialect, Orb. = Orbanići dialect).

== Transcription of Russian and Bulgarian ==
Transcription of Bulgarian follows the standard conventions for academic transliteration of Cyrillic, with the exception that Cyrillic ъ is represented as ǝ instead of ă for ease of reading, particularly when combined with a stress mark (ǝ́ instead of ắ). This is a one-to-one transliteration that directly represents the spelling of Cyrillic. This transliteration also represents Bulgarian phonology quite well (unlike the situation in Russian).

Transcription of Russian is based on the same standard, but deviates from it in order to consistently represent palatalization (always written with a following apostrophe, e.g. l', n', t', v') and the phoneme /j/ (always written j), both of which are spelled in multiple ways in Cyrillic. The following indicates how to convert between the two:

Cyrillic letters	Letter class	Academic transliteration	This article's transcription
а э ы о у	Non-palatal vowels	a è y o u	a e y o u
я е и ё ю	Palatal vowels	ja e i ë ju	If following a consonant letter, a e i o u with preceding apostrophe ('); elsewhere, ja je ji jo ju.
й ў	Semivowels	j ŭ	same
ь	Soft sign	'	same
ъ	Hard sign	''	not written
щ	A consonant sign	šč	šš'

The result is that this article's transcription is almost directly phonemic, making it significantly easier for readers not familiar with the complications of Cyrillic spelling. Note that the transcription used here continues the standard practice of representing the Cyrillic letters ы и as y i, although they are normally considered allophones of each other. This is because the pronunciation of the two letters is significantly different, and Russian ы normally continues Common Slavic *y [ɨ], which was a separate phoneme.

The letter щ is conventionally written št in Bulgarian, šč in Russian. This article writes šš' in Russian to reflect the modern pronunciation [ɕɕ].

Both transcriptions indicate stress with an acute accent (á é í ó ú ý ǝ́). Stress is indicated in Cyrillic in the same fashion, except with the letter ё, which is always stressed.

== Pronunciation ==
=== Capsule summary of Russian pronunciation ===
The transcription used in this article is morphophonemic rather than strictly phonemic, i.e. it writes the underlying phonemes rather than the phonemes actually heard when pronounced. The difference occurs particularly in the representation of unstressed vowels, where multiple underlying phonemes merge. For example, underlying e and i merge into the same sound when unstressed, but the difference is revealed in related forms based on the same root: e.g. z'eml'á [zʲɪmˈlʲæ] "land" has accusative z'éml'u [ˈzʲemlʲʉ], but z'imá [zʲɪˈma] "winter" has accusative z'ímu [ˈzʲimu]. When the transcription (which is derived from the spelling) disagrees with the actual morphophonemic pronunciation, the latter is indicated specially, e.g. čto /što/; š'it' /šyt'/; ž'óltyj /žóltyj/; ž'ená /žená/ [ʐɨˈna]; sólnc'e /sónce/ [ˈsont͡sə]. This occurs mostly with the letters š, ž, c, which are normally written palatal but pronounced non-palatal; but it is also due to occasional assimilations. Note that the rules for unstressed vowels still need to be applied (see below).

- á, é, í etc. indicates stress.
- š [ʂ], ž [ʐ] and c [t͡s] are never palatal, while č [t͡ɕ] and šš [ɕɕ] are always palatal, regardless of spelling.
- y [ɨ]: allophone of i [i] after non-palatal consonants, but written differently by convention. Written i sounds as y after š, ž, c, regardless of whether indicated as palatal in the spelling: ž'it [ʐɨtʲ] "to live".
- Vowel mergers in unstressed syllables are extensive, but not written.
  - After palatal, vowels a, o, e, i all merge as [ɪ]: t'až'ólyj [tʲɪˈʐolɨj] "heavy", v'el'ík'ij [vʲɪˈlʲikʲɪj] "big".
  - After non-palatal, vowels a and o merge as [ɐ] directly before the stress and absolutely word-initially, [ə] elsewhere: molokó [məlɐˈko] "milk", sobáka [sɐˈbakə] "dog", č'elov'ék [t͡ɕɪlɐˈvʲek] "man (human)".
  - After non-palatal, vowels e and i/y merge as [ɨ]: ž'ená [ʐɨˈna].
  - Exception: Absolutely word-finally after a palatal, e, i merge as [ɪ] but a, o merge as [ə]: s'ém'a [ˈsʲemʲə] "seed".
- Obstruents are devoiced word-finally, and agree in voicing in a cluster before another obstruent: muž [muʂ] "husband", vs'o [fsʲɵ] "everything", vokzál [vɐɡˈzal] "railway station". But v does not trigger voicing of preceding obstruent, nor is it devoiced.
- The reflexive suffix -s'a and reflexive infinitive -t'-s'a are pronounced without palatalization, i.e. as if written -sa and -t-sa.

=== Capsule summary of Bulgarian pronunciation ===
- á, é, í etc. indicates stress.
- Stressed ǝ is actually [ɤ]; unstressed a and ǝ tend to merge as [ɐ].
- Obstruent voicing/devoicing as in Russian.

=== Capsule summary of Czech pronunciation ===
- á, é, í etc. indicates vowel length.
- ů [uː] < *ó. ou [oʊ̯] < *ú.
- h [ɦ], ch [x].
- č [tʃ], š [ʃ], ž [ʒ], ř [r̝] (a palatal fricative trill, sounding a bit like [rʑ]).
- ď [ɟ], ť [c], ň [ɲ]. Also indicated by d, t, n before i, í or ě.
- y = i but indicates normal rather than palatal pronunciation after d t n.
- ě = short e but signals palatal nature of previous consonant: dě, tě, ně = ďe, ťe, ňe; vě, fě, bě, pě = vje, fje, bje, pje; mě = mňe.
- Obstruent voicing/devoicing as in Russian. ř after obstruent is itself devoiced rather than trigger voicing: přímý [pr̝̊iːmiː] "straight".

=== Capsule summary of Polish pronunciation ===
- Retroflex consonants: sz [ʂ], cz [t͡ʂ], ż [ʐ], rz [ʐ] < *ř (as in Czech), dż [d͡ʐ].
- Alveolopalatal consonants: ś or si [ɕ], ć or ci [t͡ɕ], ź or zi [ʑ], dź or dzi [d͡ʑ], ń or ni [ɲ].
- All consonants are palatalized before i. Note that alveolar s, z, n become alveolopalatal when palatalized, absorbing the i before another vowel: chodzić [ˈxɔd͡ʑit͡ɕ] "to walk", siedzieć [ˈɕɛd͡ʑɛt͡ɕ] "to sit".
- h or ch [x], w [v], ł [w].
- y [ɨ], ó [u] < *oː, ę [ɛ̃], ą [ɔ̃].
- Obstruent voicing/devoicing as in Russian and Czech. However, w and rz do not voice a preceding voiceless obstruent, but instead are devoiced: kwiat [kfʲat] "flower", przyjść [pʂɨjɕt͡ɕ] "to come" < *prʲijtʲ (cf. Russian pr'ijt'í).

=== Capsule summary of Serbo-Croatian pronunciation ===
- Accents: á (long rising), à (short rising), ȃ (long falling), ȁ (short falling), ā (length in unstressed syllable), ã (long rising in Chakavian dialect = Common Slavic neoacute).
- š [ʃ], č [tʃ], ž [ʒ], dž [dʒ], ć [tɕ], đ [dʑ], nj [ɲ], lj [ʎ].
- Russian-style obstruent voicing/devoicing does not occur.

== Dialectal differentiation ==
After the three palatalizations of Proto-Slavic, dialectal variation became more apparent. Some dialects (such as Proto-East Slavic), applied the second regressive palatalization across an intervening *v.

- Russian: *gwojzda > *gwězda > zvězda > [zʲvʲɪˈzda] ('star')
- Polish: *gwojzda > *gwězda > gwiazda > [ˈɡvʲazda] ('star')

Also, the realization of the palatalizations' sibilants varied a little amongst dialects. Belić (1921) argues that the phonetic character of the palatalizations was uniform throughout Common Slavic and that West Slavic languages developed *š later on by analogy. In all dialects (except for Lechitic), [dz] was deaffricated to [z]:

- Ukrainian: *zvizda> z'vizda; and zyrka/z'irka> Cf. Pol.: gwiazda-> GV/ZV + I + ZD; Z'/Z + Y/I + R + K +A ( zIr > vision).

The final cutoff point for the Proto-Slavic period was the change of *ě to *a after palatal consonants and *j, which then created *ča/*ka contrasts. This, and the shortening and elision of weak yers (*ь/ĭ and *ъ/ŭ) (see Havlík's law) that created newly formed closed syllables ended the period of syllabic synharmony characteristic of Common Slavic.

For many Common Slavic dialects—including most of West Slavic, all but the northernmost portions of East Slavic, and some western parts of South Slavic— *g lenited from a voiced velar plosive to a voiced velar fricative ([ɡ] > [ɣ]). Because this change was not universal and because it did not occur in a number of East Slavic dialects (such as Belarusian and South Russian) until after the application of Havlík's law, Shevelov (1977) calls into question early projections of this change and postulates three independent instigations of lenition, dating the earliest to before 900 AD and the latest to the early thirteenth century.

Because the reflexes for the nasal vowels *ę and *ǫ differ so widely, it's very likely that their phonetic value in Late Proto-Slavic was not uniform.

== See also ==
- Slavic languages
- History of the Slavic languages
- Proto-Slavic language
- Indo-European vocabulary
- Wiktionary:Appendix:Swadesh lists for Slavic languages
- Slavic studies

== Bibliography ==
- Belić, Aleksandar (1921), "Најмлађа (Трећа) Промена Задњенепчаних Сугласника k, g и h у Прасловенском Језику", Јужнословенски Филолог, II: 18–39
- Bethin, Christina Yurkiw (1998), Slavic Prosody: Language Change and Phonological Theory, Cambridge University Press, ISBN 0-521-59148-1
- Channon, Robert (1972), On the Place of the Progressive Palatalization of Velars in the Relative Chronology of Slavic, The Hague: Mouton
- Lehr-Spławiński, Tadeusz (1957), "Z dziejów języka prasłowiańskiego (Urywek z większej całości)", Езиковедски Изследвания В Чест На Академик Стефан Младенов, Sofia
- Schenkar, Alexander M. (2002), "Proto-Slavonic", in Comrie, Bernard; Corbett, Greville. G. (eds.), The Slavonic Languages, London: Routledge, pp. 60–124, ISBN 0-415-28078-8
- Shevelov, George Y. (1977), "On the Chronology of h and the New g in Ukrainian" (PDF), Harvard Ukrainian Studies, vol. 1, Cambridge: Harvard Ukrainian Research Institute, pp. 137–52, archived from the original (PDF) on 2008-10-31
