= Labrang Nyingba =

Coordinates: 29.652052°N 91.133143°E

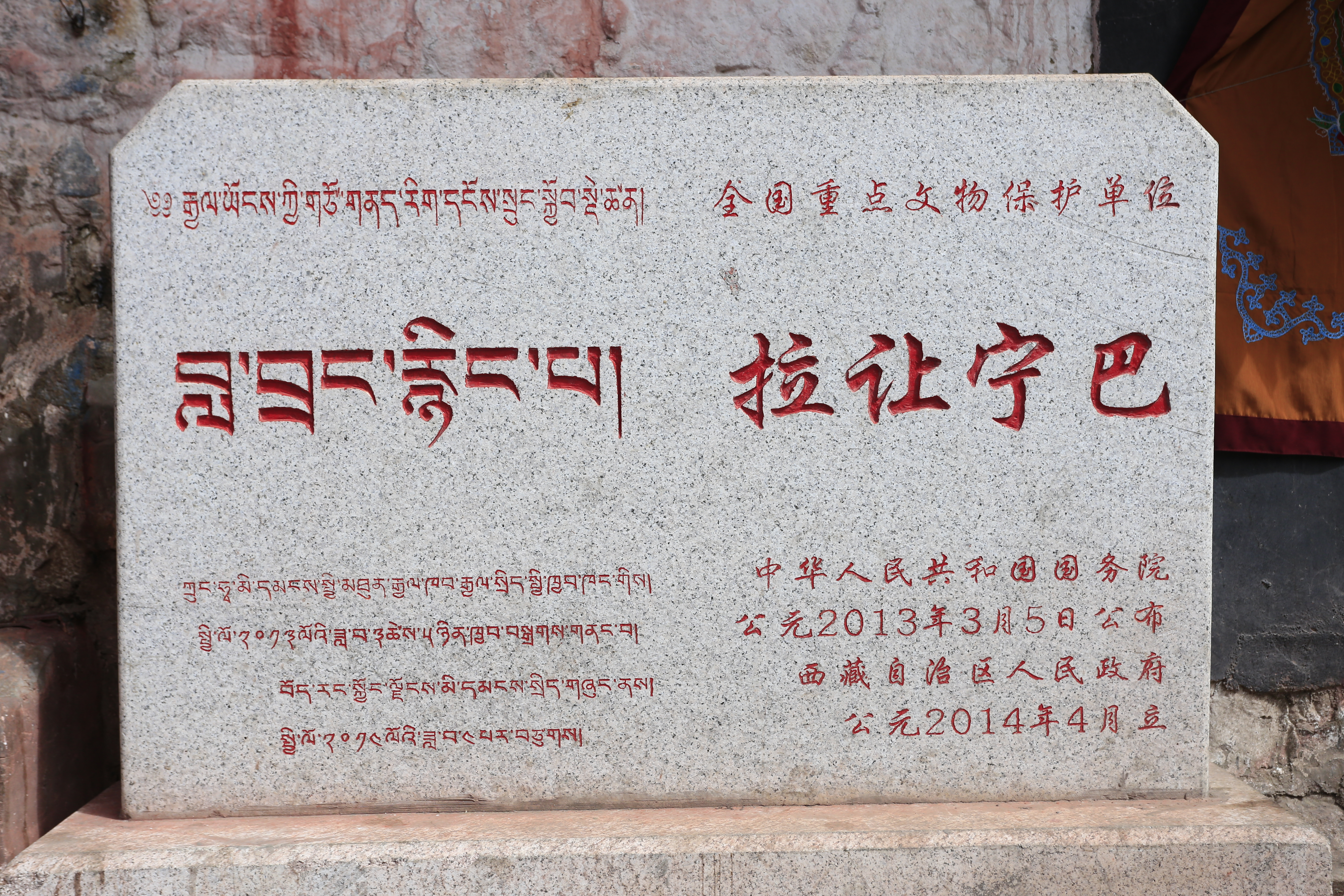
Labrang Nyingba

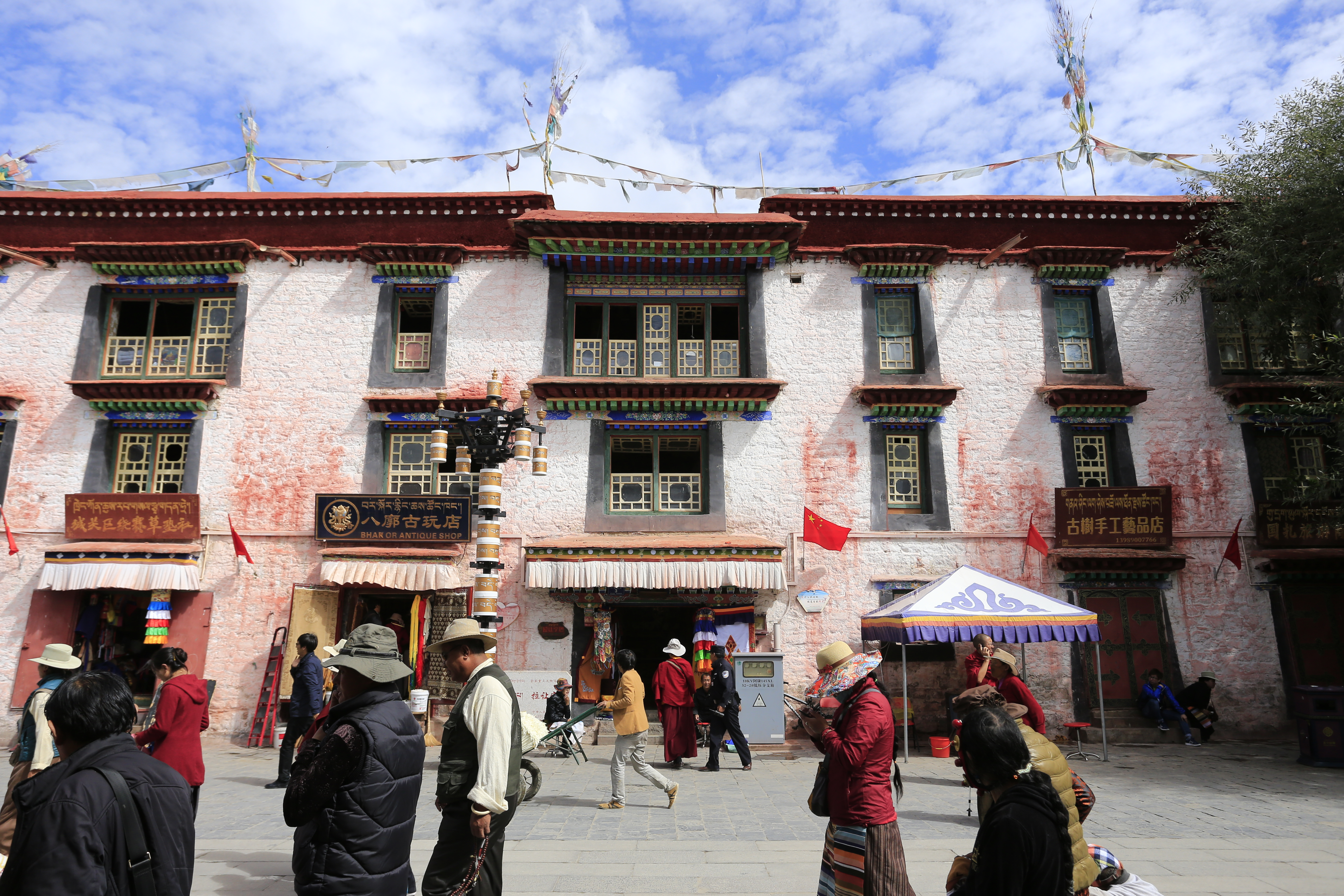
Labrang Nyingba

Labrang Nyingba (Tibetan: བླ་བྲང་རྙིང་པ།, Wylie: bla brang rnying pa, Chinese: 拉让宁巴), located in Barkhor South Street, Chengguan District, Lhasa, the Tibet Autonomous Region, is an ancient architectural compound that is now a residential house.

== History ==
Labrang Nyingba is one of the oldest buildings in Lhasa. Tibetan "La brang" refers to the living Buddha's chambers, Tibetan "Nyingba" means "old". Labrang Nyingba was historically called "tunba", is the current Tibetan language creator Thonmi Sambhota's residence. In the 15th century, the founder of Gelug School of Tibetan Buddhism had lived here. In the 17th century, the 5th Dalai Lama used it as a chamber, until he built a new one in Jokhang. Later, they called this building as Labrang Nyingba. After the annexation of Tibet by the People's Republic of China, Lhagyang Nyingba served as the headquarters of the People's Liberation Army (PLA) forces in Tibet.

In 2009, there were 18 families renting the compound as public housing. Many of the residents raised flowers and placed them on the wooden fences on each floor of the compound, turning Labrang Nyingba into a garden. In 2009, the second floor of Labrang Nyingba, adjacent to Barkhor South Street, served as a temporary office for the Barkhor Community Committee. The side of the La Jean Nimba compound adjacent to Barkhor South Street is made up of storefronts with ethnic dress stores, handicraft stores, souvenir stores and more.
