= Zanabazar square script =

Abugida developed by the monk and scholar Zanabazar

Zanabazar's square script 𑨢𑨆𑨏𑨳𑨋𑨆𑨬𑨳
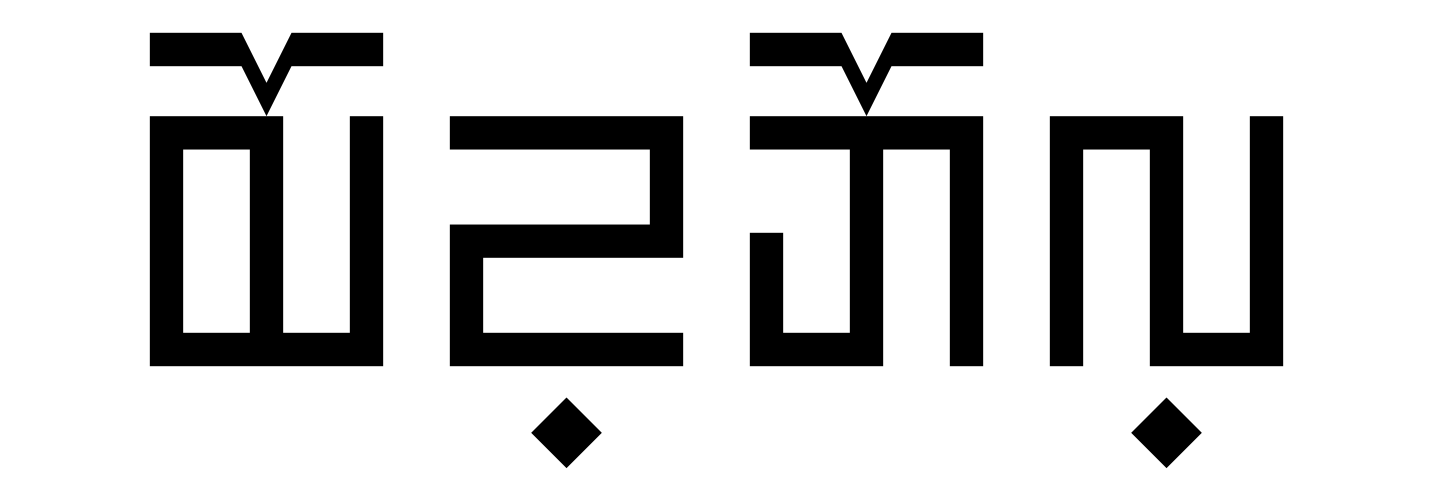
- Script type: Abugida
- Creator: Zanabazar
- Period: unknown
- Direction: Left-to-right
- Languages: Mongolian, Tibetan, Sanskrit

Related scripts
- Parent systems: Egyptian: Proto-Sinaitic; Phoenician; Aramaic; Brahmi; Gupta; Tibetan; Phagspa; Zanabazar's square script

ISO 15924
- ISO 15924: Zanb (339), Zanabazar Square (Zanabazarin Dörböljin Useg, Xewtee Dörböljin Bicig, Horizontal Square Script)

Unicode
- Unicode alias: Zanabazar Square
- Unicode range: U+11A00–U+11A4F Zanabazar Square

Zanabazar's square script is a horizontal Mongolian square script (Mongolian: Хэвтээ Дөрвөлжин бичиг, romanized: Hevtee Dörvöljin bichig or Хэвтээ Дөрвөлжин Үсэг, Hevtee Dörvöljin Üseg), an abugida developed by the monk and scholar Zanabazar based on the Tibetan alphabet to write Mongolian. It can also be used to write Tibetan language and Sanskrit as a geometric typeface.

It was re-discovered in 1801 and the script's applications during its using period are not known. It read left to right, and employed vowel diacritics above and below the consonant letters.

== Letters ==
=== Vowels ===
The Zanabazar Square script is an abugida. Each consonant represents a syllable with an inherent vowel /a/. The vowel can be changed by adding a diacritic to the consonant. Only the vowel /a/ is written as an independent letter; other independent vowels, for example those at the start of a word which can't be attached to a consonant, are written by adding the appropriate diacritic to the letter ⟨𑨀⟩. A length mark indicates that the vowel sound is long and a chandrabindu ⟨𑨵⟩ indicates that it is nasalised. The final consonant mark ⟨𑨳⟩ functions as a virama, or "killer stroke" that removes the inherent vowel, leaving an isolated consonant. When transcribing Sanskrit or Tibetan, a different virama, ⟨𑨴⟩ is used. Two additional diacritics are used for Sanskrit transcription, the anusvara ⟨𑨸⟩, which adds nasalisation and the visarga ⟨𑨹⟩, which adds aspiration.

Vowels, diacritics, and examples
diacritics		◌ 𑨁 i	◌ 𑨂 ü	◌ 𑨃 u	◌ 𑨄 e	◌ 𑨅 ö	◌𑨆 o	◌𑨇 ai or i	◌𑨈 au or u	◌𑨉 i (Note: Used in Sanskrit transcription.)	◌𑨊 ā	◌𑨵 ã	◌𑨳	◌ 𑨴 (Note: Used in Sanskrit and Tibetan transcription.)	◌𑨸 ṃ	◌𑨹 ḥ
independent vowels	𑨀 a	𑨀𑨁 i	𑨀𑨂 ü	𑨀𑨃 u	𑨀𑨄 e	𑨀𑨅 ö	𑨀𑨆 o	𑨀𑨇 ai or i	𑨀𑨈 au or u	𑨀𑨉 i	𑨀𑨊 ā	𑨀𑨵 ã			𑨀𑨸 aṃ	𑨀𑨹 aḥ
consonant ⟨𑨋⟩ + diacritic	𑨋 ka	𑨋𑨁 ki	𑨋𑨂 kü	𑨋𑨃 ku	𑨋𑨄 ke	𑨋𑨅 kö	𑨋𑨆 ko	𑨋𑨇 kai or ki	𑨋𑨈 kau or ku	𑨋𑨉 ki	𑨋𑨊 kā	𑨋𑨵 kã	𑨋𑨳 k	𑨋𑨴 k	𑨋𑨸 kaṃ	𑨋𑨹 kaḥ

=== Consonants ===
The Zanabazar script includes twenty basic consonants used for writing Mongolian, and twenty additional consonants that are used for transcribing Sanskrit, Tibetan, Chinese, and other languages.

Basic consonants for Mongolian
𑨍 ga	𑨋 ka	𑨏 nga	𑨒 ja	𑨐 ca	𑨓 nya	𑨛 da	𑨚 tha	𑨝 na	𑨠 ba (Note: Sometimes substituted for non-initial va.)
𑨞 pa	𑨢 ma	𑨪 ya	𑨫 ra	𑨭 va	𑨬 la	𑨮 sha	𑨰 sa	𑨱 ha	𑨲 kssa

Additional consonants for other languages
𑨌 kha	𑨎 gha	𑨑 cha	𑨔 tta	𑨕 ttha	𑨖 dda	𑨗 ddha	𑨘 nna	𑨙 ta	𑨜 dha
𑨟 pha	𑨡 bha	𑨣 tsa	𑨤 tsha	𑨥 dza	𑨦 dzha	𑨧 zha	𑨨 za	𑨩 -a	𑨯 ssa

=== Tibetan consonant clusters ===
The following diacritics are used for transcribing Tibetan consonant clusters.

Clusters letters and examples
diacritic	𑨺 r-	◌𑨻 -ya	◌𑨼 -ra	◌𑨽 -la	◌𑨾 -va
consonant ⟨𑨋⟩+ diacritic	𑨺𑨋 rka	𑨋𑨻 kya	𑨋𑨼 kra	𑨋𑨽 kla	𑨋𑨾 kva

=== Other characters ===
Head marks are similar to Tibetan yig mgo, and may be used to mark the beginning of a text, page, or section. They may be decorated with a candra, ⟨𑨷⟩ or ⟨𑨶⟩

Head marks
𑨿𑩀 𑨿𑨷𑩀𑨷 𑨿𑨶𑩀𑨶 single-line	𑩅𑩆 𑩅𑨷𑩆𑨷 𑩅𑨶𑩆𑨶 double-line

Punctuation
𑩁 tsheg	𑩂 shad	𑩃 double shad	𑩄 long tsheg

== Unicode ==
"Zanabazar Square" has been included in the Unicode Standard since the release of Unicode version 10.0 in June 2017. The Zanabazar Square block contains 72 characters.

The Unicode block for Zanabazar Square is U+11A00–U+11A4F:

Zanabazar Square^{[1]}^{[2]} Official Unicode Consortium code chart (PDF)
	0	1	2	3	4	5	6	7	8	9	A	B	C	D	E	F
U+11A0x	𑨀	𑨁	𑨂	𑨃	𑨄	𑨅	𑨆	𑨇	𑨈	𑨉	𑨊	𑨋	𑨌	𑨍	𑨎	𑨏
U+11A1x	𑨐	𑨑	𑨒	𑨓	𑨔	𑨕	𑨖	𑨗	𑨘	𑨙	𑨚	𑨛	𑨜	𑨝	𑨞	𑨟
U+11A2x	𑨠	𑨡	𑨢	𑨣	𑨤	𑨥	𑨦	𑨧	𑨨	𑨩	𑨪	𑨫	𑨬	𑨭	𑨮	𑨯
U+11A3x	𑨰	𑨱	𑨲	𑨳	𑨴	𑨵	𑨶	𑨷	𑨸	𑨹	𑨺	𑨻	𑨼	𑨽	𑨾	𑨿
U+11A4x	𑩀	𑩁	𑩂	𑩃	𑩄	𑩅	𑩆	𑩇								
Notes: 1. As of Unicode version 17.0; 2. Grey areas indicate non-assigned code points

== See also ==
- Mongolian writing systems
- ʼPhags-pa script
