= Ḍha =

Letter "Ḍha" in Indic scripts

Example glyphs
- Bengali–Assamese: Ḍha
- Thai: ฒ
- Malayalam: ഢ
- Sinhala: ඪ
- Ashoka Brahmi: Ḍha
- Devanagari: Ḍha

Cognates
- Hebrew: ד
- Greek: Δ
- Latin: D
- Cyrillic: Д

Properties
- Phonemic representation: /ɖʱ/ /tʰ/^{B}
- IAST transliteration: ḍ Ḍ
- ISCII code point: C0 (192)
- ^B in Tai languages, Khmer and Mon

Ḍha (also romanized as Ddha) is a consonant of Indic abugidas. In modern Indic scripts, Ḍha is derived from the early "Ashoka" Brahmi letter after having gone through the Gupta letter. As with the other cerebral consonants, ḍha is not found in most scripts for Tai, Sino-Tibetan, and other non-Indic languages, except for a few scripts, which retain these letters for transcribing Sanskrit religious terms.

== Āryabhaṭa numeration ==
Aryabhata used Devanagari letters for numbers, very similar to the Greek numerals, even after the invention of Indian numerals. The values of the different forms of ढ are:

- ढ [ɖʰə] = 14 (१४)
- ढि [ɖʰɪ] = 1,400 (१ ४००)
- ढु [ɖʰʊ] = 140,000 (१ ४० ०००)
- ढृ [ɖʰri] = 14,000,000 (१ ४० ०० ०००)
- ढॢ [ɖʰlə] = 1,400,000,000 (१ ४० ०० ०० ०००)
- ढे [ɖʰe] = 14×10^{10} (१४×१०^{१०})
- ढै [ɖʰɛː] = 14×10^{12} (१४×१०^{१२})
- ढो [ɖʰoː] = 14×10^{14} (१४×१०^{१४})
- ढौ [ɖʰɔː] = 14×10^{16} (१४×१०^{१६})

== Historic Ḍha ==
There are three different general early historic scripts - Brahmi and its variants, Kharoṣṭhī, and Tocharian, the so-called slanting Brahmi. Ḍha as found in standard Brahmi, was a simple geometric shape, with variations toward more flowing forms by the Gupta. The Tocharian Ḍha did not have an alternate Fremdzeichen form. The third form of ḍha, in Kharoshthi was probably derived from Aramaic separately from the Brahmi letter.

=== Brahmi Ḍha ===
The Brahmi letter, Ḍha, is probably derived from the altered Aramaic Dalet, and is thus related to the modern Latin D and Greek Delta. Several identifiable styles of writing the Brahmi Ḍha can be found, most associated with a specific set of inscriptions from an artifact or diverse records from an historic period. As the earliest and most geometric style of Brahmi, the letters found on the Edicts of Ashoka and other records from around that time are normally the reference form for Brahmi letters, with vowel marks not attested until later forms of Brahmi back-formed to match the geometric writing style.

Brahmi Ḍha historic forms
| Ashoka (3rd-1st c. BCE) | Girnar (~150 BCE) | Kushana (~150-250 CE) | Gujarat (~250 CE) | Gupta (~350 CE) |

=== Tocharian Ḍha ===
The Tocharian letter is derived from the Brahmi, but does not have an alternate Fremdzeichen form.

Tocharian Ḍha with vowel marks
| Ḍha | Ḍhā | Ḍhi | Ḍhī | Ḍhu | Ḍhū | Ḍhr | Ḍhr̄ | Ḍhe | Ḍhai | Ḍho | Ḍhau | Ḍhä |

=== Kharoṣṭhī Ḍha ===
The Kharoṣṭhī letter is generally accepted as being derived from the altered Aramaic Dalet, and is thus related to D and Delta, in addition to the Brahmi Ḍha.

== Devanagari Ḍha ==
Ḍha (ढ) is a consonant of the Devanagari abugida. It ultimately arose from the Brahmi letter, after having gone through the Gupta letter. Letters that derive from it are the Gujarati letter ઢ, and the Modi letter 𑘛.

=== Devanagari-using Languages ===
In all languages, ढ is pronounced as [ɖʱə] or [ɖʱ] when appropriate. Like all Indic scripts, Devanagari uses vowel marks attached to the base consonant to override the inherent /ə/ vowel:

Devanagari ढ with vowel marks
| Ḍha | Ḍhā | Ḍhi | Ḍhī | Ḍhu | Ḍhū | Ḍhr | Ḍhr̄ | Ḍhl | Ḍhl̄ | Ḍhe | Ḍhai | Ḍho | Ḍhau | Ḍh |
|---|---|---|---|---|---|---|---|---|---|---|---|---|---|---|
| ढ | ढा | ढि | ढी | ढु | ढू | ढृ | ढॄ | ढॢ | ढॣ | ढे | ढै | ढो | ढौ | ढ् |

=== Conjuncts with ढ ===
Devanagari exhibits conjunct ligatures, as is common in Indic scripts. In modern Devanagari texts, most conjuncts are formed by reducing the letter shape to fit tightly to the following letter, usually by dropping a character's vertical stem, sometimes referred to as a "half form". Some conjunct clusters are always represented by a true ligature, instead of a shape that can be broken into constituent independent letters. Vertically stacked conjuncts are ubiquitous in older texts, while only a few are still used routinely in modern Devanagari texts. Lacking a vertical stem to drop for making a half form, Ḍha either forms a stacked conjunct/ligature, or uses its full form with Virama. The use of ligatures and vertical conjuncts may vary across languages using the Devanagari script, with Marathi in particular avoiding their use where other languages would use them.

==== Ligature conjuncts of ढ ====
True ligatures are quite rare in Indic scripts. The most common ligated conjuncts in Devanagari are in the form of a slight mutation to fit in context or as a consistent variant form appended to the adjacent characters. Those variants include Na and the Repha and Rakar forms of Ra. Nepali and Marathi texts use the "eyelash" Ra half form for an initial "R" instead of repha.

- Repha र্ (r) + ढ (ḍʱa) gives the ligature rḍʱa: ^{note}

- Eyelash र্ (r) + ढ (ḍʱa) gives the ligature rḍʱa:

- ढ্ (ḍʱ) + rakar र (ra) gives the ligature ḍʱra:

- ढ্ (ḍʱ) + न (na) gives the ligature ḍʱna:

- प্ (p) + ढ (ḍʱa) gives the ligature pḍʱa:

- ष্ (ṣ) + ढ (ḍʱa) gives the ligature ṣḍʱa:

==== Stacked conjuncts of ढ ====
Vertically stacked ligatures are the most common conjunct forms found in Devanagari text. Although the constituent characters may need to be stretched and moved slightly in order to stack neatly, stacked conjuncts can be broken down into recognizable base letters, or a letter and an otherwise standard ligature.

- छ্ (cʰ) + ढ (ḍʱa) gives the ligature cʰḍʱa:

- ड্ (ḍ) + ढ (ḍʱa) gives the ligature ḍḍʱa:

- द্ (d) + ढ (ḍʱa) gives the ligature dḍʱa:

- ढ্ (ḍʱ) + ब (ba) gives the ligature ḍʱba:

- ढ্ (ḍʱ) + भ (bʰa) gives the ligature ḍʱbʰa:

- ढ্ (ḍʱ) + च (ca) gives the ligature ḍʱca:

- ढ্ (ḍʱ) + छ (cʰa) gives the ligature ḍʱcʰa:

- ढ্ (ḍʱ) + द (da) gives the ligature ḍʱda:

- ढ্ (ḍʱ) + ड (ḍa) gives the ligature ḍʱḍa:

- ढ্ (ḍʱ) + ढ (ḍʱa) gives the ligature ḍʱḍʱa:

- ढ্ (ḍʱ) + ध (dʱa) gives the ligature ḍʱdʱa:

- ढ্ (ḍʱ) + ग (ga) gives the ligature ḍʱga:

- ढ্ (ḍʱ) + घ (ɡʱa) gives the ligature ḍʱɡʱa:

- ढ্ (ḍʱ) + ह (ha) gives the ligature ḍʱha:

- ढ্ (ḍʱ) + ज (ja) gives the ligature ḍʱja:

- ढ্ (ḍʱ) + झ (jʰa) gives the ligature ḍʱjʰa:

- ढ্ (ḍʱ) + ज্ (j) + ञ (ña) gives the ligature ḍʱjña:

- ढ্ (ḍʱ) + क (ka) gives the ligature ḍʱka:

- ढ্ (ḍʱ) + ख (kʰa) gives the ligature ḍʱkʰa:

- ढ্ (ḍʱ) + क্ (k) + ष (ṣa) gives the ligature ḍʱkṣa:

- ढ্ (ḍʱ) + ल (la) gives the ligature ḍʱla:

- ढ্ (ḍʱ) + ळ (ḷa) gives the ligature ḍʱḷa:

- ढ্ (ḍʱ) + म (ma) gives the ligature ḍʱma:

- ढ্ (ḍʱ) + ङ (ŋa) gives the ligature ḍʱŋa:

- ढ্ (ḍʱ) + ण (ṇa) gives the ligature ḍʱṇa:

- ढ্ (ḍʱ) + ञ (ña) gives the ligature ḍʱña:

- ढ্ (ḍʱ) + प (pa) gives the ligature ḍʱpa:

- ढ্ (ḍʱ) + फ (pʰa) gives the ligature ḍʱpʰa:

- ढ্ (ḍʱ) + स (sa) gives the ligature ḍʱsa:

- ढ্ (ḍʱ) + श (ʃa) gives the ligature ḍʱʃa:

- ढ্ (ḍʱ) + ष (ṣa) gives the ligature ḍʱṣa:

- ढ্ (ḍʱ) + त (ta) gives the ligature ḍʱta:

- ढ্ (ḍʱ) + थ (tʰa) gives the ligature ḍʱtʰa:

- ढ্ (ḍʱ) + ट (ṭa) gives the ligature ḍʱṭa:

- ढ্ (ḍʱ) + ठ (ṭʰa) gives the ligature ḍʱṭʰa:

- ढ্ (ḍʱ) + व (va) gives the ligature ḍʱva:

- ढ্ (ḍʱ) + य (ya) gives the ligature ḍʱya:

- ङ্ (ŋ) + ढ (ḍʱa) gives the ligature ŋḍʱa:

- ट্ (ṭ) + ढ (ḍʱa) gives the ligature ṭḍʱa:

- ठ্ (ṭʰ) + ढ (ḍʱa) gives the ligature ṭʰḍʱa:

== Bengali Ḍha ==
The Bengali script ঢ is derived from the Siddhaṃ, and is marked by a similar horizontal head line, but less geometric shape, than its Devanagari counterpart, ढ. The inherent vowel of Bengali consonant letters is /ɔ/, so the bare letter ঢ will sometimes be transliterated as "ḍho" instead of "ḍha". Adding okar, the "o" vowel mark, gives a reading of /d̳ʱo/. Like all Indic consonants, ঢ can be modified by marks to indicate another (or no) vowel than its inherent "a".

Bengali ঢ with vowel marks
| ḍha | ḍhā | ḍhi | ḍhī | ḍhu | ḍhū | ḍhr | ḍhr̄ | ḍhe | ḍhai | ddho | ḍhau | ḍh |
|---|---|---|---|---|---|---|---|---|---|---|---|---|
| ঢ | ঢা | ঢি | ঢী | ঢু | ঢূ | ঢৃ | ঢৄ | ঢে | ঢৈ | ঢো | ঢৌ | ঢ্ |

=== ঢ in Bengali-using languages ===
ঢ is used as a basic consonant character in all of the major Bengali script orthographies, including Bengali and Assamese.

=== Conjuncts with ঢ ===
Bengali ঢ exhibits a few conjunct ligatures, as is common in Indic scripts.

- ঢ্ (ḍʱ) + র (ra) gives the ligature ḍʱra, with the ra phala suffix:

- ঢ্ (ḍʱ) + য (ya) gives the ligature ḍʱya, with the ya phala suffix:

- ণ্ (ṇ) + ঢ (ḍʱa) gives the ligature ṇḍʱa:

- র্ (r) + ঢ্ (ḍʱ) + য (ya) gives the ligature rḍʱya, with the repha prefix and ya phala suffix:

== Gujarati Ḍha ==
Gujarati Ḍha.

Ḍha (ઢ) is the fourteenth consonant of the Gujarati abugida. It is derived from the Devanagari Ḍha with the top bar (shiro rekha) removed, and ultimately the Brahmi letter.

=== Gujarati-using Languages ===
The Gujarati script is used to write the Gujarati and Kutchi languages. In both languages, ઢ is pronounced as [ɖʱə] or [ɖʱ] when appropriate. Like all Indic scripts, Gujarati uses vowel marks attached to the base consonant to override the inherent /ə/ vowel:

| Ḍha | Ḍhā | Ḍhi | Ḍhī | Ḍhu | Ḍhū | Ḍhr | Ḍhl | Ḍhr̄ | Ḍhl̄ | Ḍhĕ | Ḍhe | Ḍhai | Ḍhŏ | Ḍho | Ḍhau | Ḍh |
|---|---|---|---|---|---|---|---|---|---|---|---|---|---|---|---|---|
Gujarati Ḍha syllables, with vowel marks in red.

=== Conjuncts with ઢ ===
Gujarati ઢ exhibits conjunct ligatures, much like its parent Devanagari Script. While most Gujarati conjuncts can only be formed by reducing the letter shape to create a "half form" that fits tightly to following letter, Ḍha does not have a half form. A few conjunct clusters can be represented by a true ligature, instead of a shape that can be broken into constituent independent letters, and vertically stacked conjuncts can also be found in Gujarati, although much less commonly than in Devanagari. Lacking a half form, Ḍha will normally use an explicit virama when forming conjuncts without a true ligature. True ligatures are quite rare in Indic scripts. The most common ligated conjuncts in Gujarati are in the form of a slight mutation to fit in context or as a consistent variant form appended to the adjacent characters. Those variants include Na and the Repha and Rakar forms of Ra.

- ર્ (r) + ઢ (ɖʱa) gives the ligature RḌha:

- ઢ્ (ɖʱ) + ર (ra) gives the ligature ḌhRa:

- ઢ્ (ɖʱ) + ઢ (ɖʱa) gives the ligature ḌhḌha:

- ઢ્ (ɖʱ) + ન (na) gives the ligature ḌhNa:

== Telugu Ḍha ==
Telugu independent and subjoined Ḍha.

Ḍha (ఢ) is a consonant of the Telugu abugida. It ultimately arose from the Brahmi letter. It is closely related to the Kannada letter ಢ. Most Telugu consonants contain a v-shaped headstroke that is related to the horizontal headline found in other Indic scripts, although headstrokes do not connect adjacent letters in Telugu. The headstroke is normally lost when adding vowel matras. Telugu conjuncts are created by reducing trailing letters to a subjoined form that appears below the initial consonant of the conjunct. Many subjoined forms are created by dropping their headline, with many extending the end of the stroke of the main letter body to form an extended tail reaching up to the right of the preceding consonant. This subjoining of trailing letters to create conjuncts is in contrast to the leading half forms of Devanagari and Bengali letters. Ligature conjuncts are not a feature in Telugu, with the only non-standard construction being an alternate subjoined form of Ṣa (borrowed from Kannada) in the KṢa conjunct.

== Malayalam Ḍha ==
Malayalam letter Ḍha

Ḍha (ഢ) is a consonant of the Malayalam abugida. It ultimately arose from the Brahmi letter, via the Grantha letter Ḍha. Like in other Indic scripts, Malayalam consonants have the inherent vowel "a", and take one of several modifying vowel signs to represent syllables with another vowel or no vowel at all.

Malayalam Ḍha matras: Ḍha, Ḍhā, Ḍhi, Ḍhī, Ḍhu, Ḍhū, Ḍhr̥, Ḍhr̥̄, Ḍhl̥, Ḍhl̥̄, Ḍhe, Ḍhē, Ḍhai, Ḍho, Ḍhō, Ḍhau, and Ḍh.

=== Conjuncts of ഢ ===
As is common in Indic scripts, Malayalam joins letters together to form conjunct consonant clusters. There are several ways in which conjuncts are formed in Malayalam texts: using a post-base form of a trailing consonant placed under the initial consonant of a conjunct, a combined ligature of two or more consonants joined together, a conjoining form that appears as a combining mark on the rest of the conjunct, the use of an explicit candrakkala mark to suppress the inherent "a" vowel, or a special consonant form called a "chillu" letter, representing a bare consonant without the inherent "a" vowel. Texts written with the modern reformed Malayalam orthography, put̪iya lipi, may favor more regular conjunct forms than older texts in paḻaya lipi, due to changes undertaken in the 1970s by the Government of Kerala.

- ഡ് (ḍ) + ഢ (ḍʱa) gives the ligature ḍḍʱa:

- ണ് (ṇ) + ഢ (ḍʱa) gives the ligature ṇḍʱa:

== Odia Ḍha ==
Odia independent and subjoined letter Ḍha.

Ḍha (ଢ) is a consonant of the Odia abugida. It ultimately arose from the Brahmi letter, via the Siddhaṃ letter Ḍha. Like in other Indic scripts, Odia consonants have the inherent vowel "a", and take one of several modifying vowel signs to represent syllables with another vowel or no vowel at all.

Odia Ḍha with vowel matras
| Ḍha | Ḍhā | Ḍhi | Ḍhī | Ḍhu | Ḍhū | Ḍhr̥ | Ḍhr̥̄ | Ḍhl̥ | Ḍhl̥̄ | Ḍhe | Ḍhai | Ḍho | Ḍhau | Ḍh |
|---|---|---|---|---|---|---|---|---|---|---|---|---|---|---|
| ଢ | ଢା | ଢି | ଢୀ | ଢୁ | ଢୂ | ଢୃ | ଢୄ | ଢୢ | ଢୣ | ଢେ | ଢୈ | ଢୋ | ଢୌ | ଢ୍ |

As is common in Indic scripts, Odia joins letters together to form conjunct consonant clusters. The most common conjunct formation is achieved by using a small subjoined form of trailing consonants. Most consonants' subjoined forms are identical to the full form, just reduced in size, although a few drop the curved headline or have a subjoined form not directly related to the full form of the consonant. The second type of conjunct formation is through pure ligatures, where the constituent consonants are written together in a single graphic form. ଢ generates conjuncts only by subjoining and does not form ligatures.

== Tibetan ==
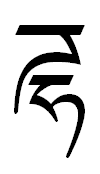
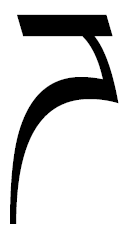
Tibetan letter Ḍha and its component characters Ḍa and Ha.

Ḍha is a consonant of the Tibetan abugida. Tibetan Ḍha is not genealogically related to Ḍha in other Indic scripts, but is rather a "compound" letter composed from Ḍa + Ha. As a cerebral consonant, it is not used for writing native Tibetan words, but can be found in terms borrowed from Sanskrit and other Indo-Aryan languages.

== Kaithi Ḍha ==
Kaithi consonant Ḍha.

Ḍha (𑂛) is a consonant of the Kaithi abugida. It ultimately arose from the Brahmi letter, via the Siddhaṃ letter Ḍha. Like in other Indic scripts, Kaithi consonants have the inherent vowel "a", and take one of several modifying vowel signs to represent syllables with another vowel or no vowel at all.

Kaithi Ḍha with vowel matras
| Ḍha | Ḍhā | Ḍhi | Ḍhī | Ḍhu | Ḍhū | Ḍhe | Ḍhai | Ḍho | Ḍhau | Ḍh |
|---|---|---|---|---|---|---|---|---|---|---|
| 𑂛 | 𑂛𑂰 | 𑂛𑂱 | 𑂛𑂲 | 𑂛𑂳 | 𑂛𑂴 | 𑂛𑂵 | 𑂛𑂶 | 𑂛𑂷 | 𑂛𑂸 | 𑂛𑂹 |

=== Conjuncts of 𑂛 ===
As is common in Indic scripts, Kaithi joins letters together to form conjunct consonant clusters. The most common conjunct formation is achieved by using a half form of preceding consonants, although several consonants use an explicit virama. Most half forms are derived from the full form by removing the vertical stem. As is common in most Indic scripts, conjuncts of ra are indicated with a repha or rakar mark attached to the rest of the consonant cluster. In addition, there are a few vertical conjuncts that can be found in Kaithi writing, but true ligatures are not used in the modern Kaithi script.

- 𑂩୍ (r) + 𑂛 (ḍʱa) gives the ligature rḍʱa:

=== Kaithi Ṛha ===
Kaithi consonant Ṛha.

Ṛha (𑂜) is a consonant of the Kaithi abugida and is derived from the Kaithi 𑂛 Ḍha.

Kaithi Rha with vowel matras
| Rha | Rhā | Rhi | Rhī | Rhu | Rhū | Rhe | Rhai | Rho | Rhau | Rh |
|---|---|---|---|---|---|---|---|---|---|---|
| 𑂛 | 𑂛𑂰 | 𑂛𑂱 | 𑂛𑂲 | 𑂛𑂳 | 𑂛𑂴 | 𑂛𑂵 | 𑂛𑂶 | 𑂛𑂷 | 𑂛𑂸 | 𑂛𑂹 |

==== Conjuncts of ====
As is common in Indic scripts, Kaithi joins letters together to form conjunct consonant clusters. The most common conjunct formation is achieved by using a half form of preceding consonants, although several consonants use an explicit virama. Most half forms are derived from the full form by removing the vertical stem. As is common in most Indic scripts, conjuncts of ra are indicated with a repha or rakar mark attached to the rest of the consonant cluster. In addition, there are a few vertical conjuncts that can be found in Kaithi writing, but true ligatures are not used in the modern Kaithi script.

- 𑂩୍ (r) + (ṛʱa) gives the ligature rṛʱa:

== Tirhuta Ḍha ==
Tirhuta consonant Ḍha

Ḍha (𑒜) is a consonant of the Tirhuta abugida. It ultimately arose from the Brahmi letter, via the Siddhaṃ letter Ddha. Like in other Indic scripts, Tirhuta consonants have the inherent vowel "a", and take one of several modifying vowel signs to represent sylables with another vowel or no vowel at all.

Tirhuta Ḍha with vowel matras
| Ḍha | Ḍhā | Ḍhi | Ḍhī | Ḍhu | Ḍhū | Ḍhṛ | Ḍhṝ | Ḍhḷ | Ḍhḹ | Ḍhē | Ḍhe | Ḍhai | Ḍhō | Ḍho | Ḍhau | Ḍh |
|---|---|---|---|---|---|---|---|---|---|---|---|---|---|---|---|---|
| 𑒜 | 𑒜𑒰 | 𑒜𑒱 | 𑒜𑒲 | 𑒜𑒳 | 𑒜𑒴 | 𑒜𑒵 | 𑒜𑒶 | 𑒜𑒷 | 𑒜𑒸 | 𑒜𑒹 | 𑒜𑒺 | 𑒜𑒻 | 𑒜𑒼 | 𑒜𑒽 | 𑒜𑒾 | 𑒜𑓂 |

=== Conjuncts of 𑒜 ===
As is common in Indic scripts, Tirhuta joins letters together to form conjunct consonant clusters. The most common conjunct formation is achieved by using an explicit virama. As is common in most Indic scripts, conjuncts of ra are indicated with a repha or rakar mark attached to the rest of the consonant cluster. In addition, other consonants take unique combining forms when in conjunct with other letters, and there are several vertical conjuncts and true ligatures that can be found in Tirhuta writing.

- 𑒜୍ (ḍʱ) + 𑒩 (ra) gives the ligature ḍʱra:

- 𑒜୍ (ḍʱ) + 𑒫 (va) gives the ligature ḍʱva:

== Comparison of Ḍha ==
The various Indic scripts are generally related to each other through adaptation and borrowing, and as such the glyphs for cognate letters, including Ḍha, are related as well.

Comparison of Ḍha in different scripts

Aramaic
Kharoṣṭhī 𐨝 | Ashoka Brahmi | Kushana Brahmi (Note: The middle "Kushana" form of Brahmi is a later style that emerged as Brahmi scripts were beginning to proliferate. Gupta Brahmi was definitely a stylistic descendant from Kushana, but other Brahmi-derived scripts may have descended from earlier forms.) | Tocharian (Note: Tocharian is probably derived from the middle period "Kushana" form of Brahmi, although artifacts from that time are not plentiful enough to establish a definite succession.)
Gupta Brahmi | Pallava
Kadamba -
Bhaiksuki 𑰛 | Siddhaṃ | Grantha 𑌢 | Cham -
Sinhala ඪ | Pyu / Old Mon (Note: Pyu and Old Mon are probably the precursors of the Burmese script, and may be derived from either the Pallava or Kadamba script) -
Tibetan - | Newa 𑐝 | Ahom - | Malayalam ഢ
Telugu ఢ | Burmese ဎ
Lepcha - | Ranjana | Saurashtra ꢟ | Dives Akuru 𑤙
Kannada ಢ | Kayah Li -
Limbu - | Soyombo (Note: May also be derived from Devangari (see bottom left of table)) 𑩩 | Khmer ឍ | Tamil -
Chakma 𑄙 | Tai Tham ᨰ
Meitei Mayek - | Gaudi - | Thai ฒ | Lao ຒ
Tai Le -
Marchen - | Tirhuta 𑒜 | New Tai Lue - | Tai Viet - | Aksara Kawi
'Phags-pa - | Odia ଢ | Sharada 𑆞 | Rejang - | Batak - | Buginese -
Zanabazar Square 𑨗 | Bengali-Assamese | Takri 𑚗 | Javanese ꦞ | Balinese ᬠ | Makasar -
Hangul (Note: The Origin of Hangul from 'Phags-pa is one of limited influence, inspiring at most a few basic letter shapes. Hangul does not function as an Indic abugida.) - | Northern Nagari - | Dogri 𑠗 | Laṇḍā - | Sundanese - | Baybayin -
Modi 𑘛 | Gujarati ઢ | Khojki 𑈗 | Khudabadi 𑋋 | Mahajani 𑅡 | Tagbanwa -
Devanagari | Nandinagari 𑦻 | Kaithi | Gurmukhi ਢ | Multani 𑊔 | Buhid -
Canadian Syllabics (Note: Although the basic letter forms of the Canadian Aboriginal Syllabics were derived from handwritten Devanagari letters, this abugida indicates vowel sounds by rotations of the letter form, rather than the use of vowel diacritics as is standard in Indic abugidas.) - | Soyombo (Note: May also be derived from Ranjana (see above)) 𑩩 | Sylheti Nagari ꠓ | Gunjala Gondi 𑶃 | Masaram Gondi (Note: Masaram Gondi acts as an Indic abugida, but its letterforms were not derived from any single precursor script.) 𑴙 | Hanuno'o -

== Character encodings of Ḍha ==
Most Indic scripts are encoded in the Unicode Standard, and as such the letter Ḍha in those scripts can be represented in plain text with unique codepoint. Ḍha from several modern-use scripts can also be found in legacy encodings, such as ISCII.

Character information
| Preview | | | | | ఢ | | ଢ | | ಢ | | ഢ | | ઢ | | ਢ | |
|---|---|---|---|---|---|---|---|---|---|---|---|---|---|---|---|---|
| Unicode name | DEVANAGARI LETTER DDHA | | BENGALI LETTER DDHA | | TELUGU LETTER DDHA | | ORIYA LETTER DDHA | | KANNADA LETTER DDHA | | MALAYALAM LETTER DDHA | | GUJARATI LETTER DDHA | | GURMUKHI LETTER DDHA | |
| Encodings | decimal | hex | dec | hex | dec | hex | dec | hex | dec | hex | dec | hex | dec | hex | dec | hex |
| Unicode | 2338 | U+0922 | 2466 | U+09A2 | 3106 | U+0C22 | 2850 | U+0B22 | 3234 | U+0CA2 | 3362 | U+0D22 | 2722 | U+0AA2 | 2594 | U+0A22 |
| UTF-8 | 224 164 162 | E0 A4 A2 | 224 166 162 | E0 A6 A2 | 224 176 162 | E0 B0 A2 | 224 172 162 | E0 AC A2 | 224 178 162 | E0 B2 A2 | 224 180 162 | E0 B4 A2 | 224 170 162 | E0 AA A2 | 224 168 162 | E0 A8 A2 |
| Numeric character reference | &#2338; | &#x922; | &#2466; | &#x9A2; | &#3106; | &#xC22; | &#2850; | &#xB22; | &#3234; | &#xCA2; | &#3362; | &#xD22; | &#2722; | &#xAA2; | &#2594; | &#xA22; |
| ISCII | 192 | C0 | 192 | C0 | 192 | C0 | 192 | C0 | 192 | C0 | 192 | C0 | 192 | C0 | 192 | C0 |

Character information
| Preview | Ashoka Kushana Gupta | | 𐨝 | | | | 𑌢 | |
|---|---|---|---|---|---|---|---|---|
| Unicode name | BRAHMI LETTER DDHA | | KHAROSHTHI LETTER DDHA | | SIDDHAM LETTER DDHA | | GRANTHA LETTER DDHA | |
| Encodings | decimal | hex | dec | hex | dec | hex | dec | hex |
| Unicode | 69664 | U+11020 | 68125 | U+10A1D | 71067 | U+1159B | 70434 | U+11322 |
| UTF-8 | 240 145 128 160 | F0 91 80 A0 | 240 144 168 157 | F0 90 A8 9D | 240 145 150 155 | F0 91 96 9B | 240 145 140 162 | F0 91 8C A2 |
| UTF-16 | 55300 56352 | D804 DC20 | 55298 56861 | D802 DE1D | 55301 56731 | D805 DD9B | 55300 57122 | D804 DF22 |
| Numeric character reference | &#69664; | &#x11020; | &#68125; | &#x10A1D; | &#71067; | &#x1159B; | &#70434; | &#x11322; |

Character information
| Preview | | | ྜྷ | | 𑨗 | | 𑐝 | | 𑰛 | | 𑆞 | |
|---|---|---|---|---|---|---|---|---|---|---|---|---|
| Unicode name | TIBETAN LETTER DDHA | | TIBETAN SUBJOINED LETTER DDHA | | ZANABAZAR SQUARE LETTER DDHA | | NEWA LETTER DDHA | | BHAIKSUKI LETTER DDHA | | SHARADA LETTER DDHA | |
| Encodings | decimal | hex | dec | hex | dec | hex | dec | hex | dec | hex | dec | hex |
| Unicode | 3917 | U+0F4D | 3997 | U+0F9D | 72215 | U+11A17 | 70685 | U+1141D | 72731 | U+11C1B | 70046 | U+1119E |
| UTF-8 | 224 189 141 | E0 BD 8D | 224 190 157 | E0 BE 9D | 240 145 168 151 | F0 91 A8 97 | 240 145 144 157 | F0 91 90 9D | 240 145 176 155 | F0 91 B0 9B | 240 145 134 158 | F0 91 86 9E |
| UTF-16 | 3917 | 0F4D | 3997 | 0F9D | 55302 56855 | D806 DE17 | 55301 56349 | D805 DC1D | 55303 56347 | D807 DC1B | 55300 56734 | D804 DD9E |
| Numeric character reference | &#3917; | &#xF4D; | &#3997; | &#xF9D; | &#72215; | &#x11A17; | &#70685; | &#x1141D; | &#72731; | &#x11C1B; | &#70046; | &#x1119E; |

Character information
| Preview | ဎ | | ᨰ | |
|---|---|---|---|---|
| Unicode name | MYANMAR LETTER DDHA | | TAI THAM LETTER LOW RATHA | |
| Encodings | decimal | hex | dec | hex |
| Unicode | 4110 | U+100E | 6704 | U+1A30 |
| UTF-8 | 225 128 142 | E1 80 8E | 225 168 176 | E1 A8 B0 |
| Numeric character reference | &#4110; | &#x100E; | &#6704; | &#x1A30; |

Character information
| Preview | ឍ | | ຒ | | ฒ | |
|---|---|---|---|---|---|---|
| Unicode name | KHMER LETTER TTHO | | LAO LETTER PALI DDHA | | THAI CHARACTER THO PHUTHAO | |
| Encodings | decimal | hex | dec | hex | dec | hex |
| Unicode | 6029 | U+178D | 3730 | U+0E92 | 3602 | U+0E12 |
| UTF-8 | 225 158 141 | E1 9E 8D | 224 186 146 | E0 BA 92 | 224 184 146 | E0 B8 92 |
| Numeric character reference | &#6029; | &#x178D; | &#3730; | &#xE92; | &#3602; | &#xE12; |

Character information
| Preview | ඪ | | 𑄙 | | 𑤙 | | ꢟ | |
|---|---|---|---|---|---|---|---|---|
| Unicode name | SINHALA LETTER MAHAAPRAANA DDAYANNA | | CHAKMA LETTER DHAA | | DIVES AKURU LETTER DDHA | | SAURASHTRA LETTER DDHA | |
| Encodings | decimal | hex | dec | hex | dec | hex | dec | hex |
| Unicode | 3498 | U+0DAA | 69913 | U+11119 | 71961 | U+11919 | 43167 | U+A89F |
| UTF-8 | 224 182 170 | E0 B6 AA | 240 145 132 153 | F0 91 84 99 | 240 145 164 153 | F0 91 A4 99 | 234 162 159 | EA A2 9F |
| UTF-16 | 3498 | 0DAA | 55300 56601 | D804 DD19 | 55302 56601 | D806 DD19 | 43167 | A89F |
| Numeric character reference | &#3498; | &#xDAA; | &#69913; | &#x11119; | &#71961; | &#x11919; | &#43167; | &#xA89F; |

Character information
| Preview | 𑘛 | | 𑦻 | | 𑩩 | | ꠓ | | 𑶃 | | | |
|---|---|---|---|---|---|---|---|---|---|---|---|---|
| Unicode name | MODI LETTER DDHA | | NANDINAGARI LETTER DDHA | | SOYOMBO LETTER DDHA | | SYLOTI NAGRI LETTER DDHO | | GUNJALA GONDI LETTER DDHA | | KAITHI LETTER DDHA | |
| Encodings | decimal | hex | dec | hex | dec | hex | dec | hex | dec | hex | dec | hex |
| Unicode | 71195 | U+1161B | 72123 | U+119BB | 72297 | U+11A69 | 43027 | U+A813 | 73091 | U+11D83 | 69787 | U+1109B |
| UTF-8 | 240 145 152 155 | F0 91 98 9B | 240 145 166 187 | F0 91 A6 BB | 240 145 169 169 | F0 91 A9 A9 | 234 160 147 | EA A0 93 | 240 145 182 131 | F0 91 B6 83 | 240 145 130 155 | F0 91 82 9B |
| UTF-16 | 55301 56859 | D805 DE1B | 55302 56763 | D806 DDBB | 55302 56937 | D806 DE69 | 43027 | A813 | 55303 56707 | D807 DD83 | 55300 56475 | D804 DC9B |
| Numeric character reference | &#71195; | &#x1161B; | &#72123; | &#x119BB; | &#72297; | &#x11A69; | &#43027; | &#xA813; | &#73091; | &#x11D83; | &#69787; | &#x1109B; |

Character information
| Preview | 𑒜 | |
|---|---|---|
| Unicode name | TIRHUTA LETTER DDHA | |
| Encodings | decimal | hex |
| Unicode | 70812 | U+1149C |
| UTF-8 | 240 145 146 156 | F0 91 92 9C |
| UTF-16 | 55301 56476 | D805 DC9C |
| Numeric character reference | &#70812; | &#x1149C; |

Character information
| Preview | 𑚗 | | 𑠗 | | 𑈗 | | 𑋋 | | 𑅡 | | 𑊔 | |
|---|---|---|---|---|---|---|---|---|---|---|---|---|
| Unicode name | TAKRI LETTER DDHA | | DOGRA LETTER DDHA | | KHOJKI LETTER DDHA | | KHUDAWADI LETTER DDHA | | MAHAJANI LETTER DDHA | | MULTANI LETTER DDHA | |
| Encodings | decimal | hex | dec | hex | dec | hex | dec | hex | dec | hex | dec | hex |
| Unicode | 71319 | U+11697 | 71703 | U+11817 | 70167 | U+11217 | 70347 | U+112CB | 69985 | U+11161 | 70292 | U+11294 |
| UTF-8 | 240 145 154 151 | F0 91 9A 97 | 240 145 160 151 | F0 91 A0 97 | 240 145 136 151 | F0 91 88 97 | 240 145 139 139 | F0 91 8B 8B | 240 145 133 161 | F0 91 85 A1 | 240 145 138 148 | F0 91 8A 94 |
| UTF-16 | 55301 56983 | D805 DE97 | 55302 56343 | D806 DC17 | 55300 56855 | D804 DE17 | 55300 57035 | D804 DECB | 55300 56673 | D804 DD61 | 55300 56980 | D804 DE94 |
| Numeric character reference | &#71319; | &#x11697; | &#71703; | &#x11817; | &#70167; | &#x11217; | &#70347; | &#x112CB; | &#69985; | &#x11161; | &#70292; | &#x11294; |

Character information
| Preview | ᬠ | | ꦞ | |
|---|---|---|---|---|
| Unicode name | BALINESE LETTER DA MURDA MAHAPRANA | | JAVANESE LETTER DDA MAHAPRANA | |
| Encodings | decimal | hex | dec | hex |
| Unicode | 6944 | U+1B20 | 43422 | U+A99E |
| UTF-8 | 225 172 160 | E1 AC A0 | 234 166 158 | EA A6 9E |
| Numeric character reference | &#6944; | &#x1B20; | &#43422; | &#xA99E; |

Character information
| Preview | 𑴙 | |
|---|---|---|
| Unicode name | MASARAM GONDI LETTER DDHA | |
| Encodings | decimal | hex |
| Unicode | 72985 | U+11D19 |
| UTF-8 | 240 145 180 153 | F0 91 B4 99 |
| UTF-16 | 55303 56601 | D807 DD19 |
| Numeric character reference | &#72985; | &#x11D19; |
