= Pecha =

Pecha (Tibetan: དཔེ་ཆ་, Wylie: dpe cha) is a Tibetan word meaning "book", but in particular, refers to the traditional Tibetan loose-leaf books such as the kangyur, tengyur, and sadhanas. Pechas sometimes have top and bottom cover plates made of wood, cardboard, or other firm materials, and are often seen wrapped in cloth for protection. The word pecha has entered common use in other languages such as English in the Tibetan Buddhist community, evident online in discussion forums and software products that include the word in their names.

== History ==
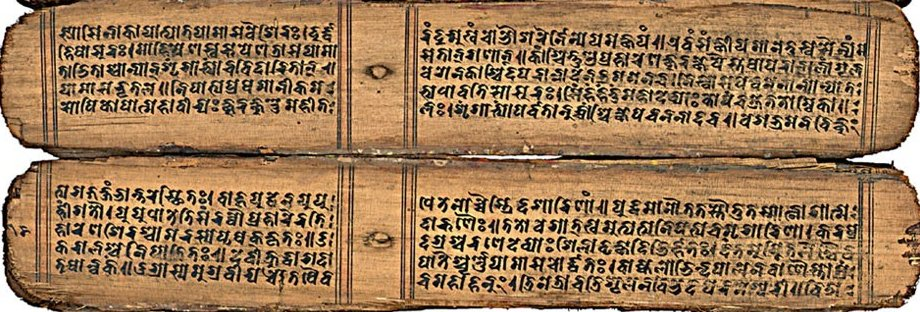
Devimahatmya Sanskrit manuscript

Pechas trace their history and unique shape back to the palm leaf manuscripts of India where palmyra and talipot palm leaves were used in the creation of texts as early as 500 BCE. The earliest existing palm leaf manuscripts date from 200 CE and were in continuous use until the 19th century.

The migration of India's manuscript technology to Tibet took place around the 7th century, when the scholar Thonmi Sambhota created the Tibetan script from his studies in India and Kashmir (his work is believed to be based on the Indian Brahmi and Gupta scripts). This script was then used to translate Buddhist Sanskrit texts into Tibetan. However, with the lack of traditional palm leaves in Tibet, birch bark was used instead; the use of bark was eventually supplanted by paper.

== In Tibetan Buddhism ==
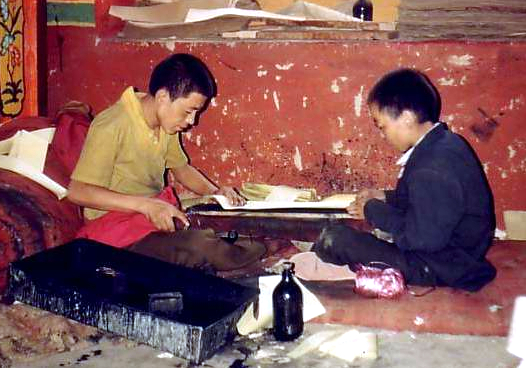
Monks practicing woodblock printing

Though digital copies of pechas are prevalent, and software exists to create them, physical reproductions by woodblock are still common. In monasteries that support woodblock printing, monks will work in teams of two. One will roll the woodblock with ink, then the other will place a blank long sheet of paper, which is then pressed by the first monk.

Tibetan Buddhist temples and shrine rooms traditionally house a complete collection of the kangyur and tengyur in pecha form. These are individually wrapped in cloth and tagged with brocade markers at one end and then placed upon shelves on the shrine.

== Software ==
The following software products can be used for generating pechas in either electronic form or for printing as physical Tibetan books.

- PechaMaker - free, closed source code, uses legacy fonts, does not support Unicode
- TibetDoc - commercial

== See also ==
- Talipot palm
- Palmyra Palm
- Palm leaf manuscript
- Woodblock printing
