= Zanabazar Square (Unicode block) =

Unicode block

- Range: U+11A00..U+11A4F (80 code points)
- Plane: SMP
- Scripts: Zanabazar Square
- Assigned: 72 code points
- Unused: 8 reserved code points

Unicode version history
- 10.0 (2017): 72 (+72)

Unicode documentation
- Code chart ∣ Web page

Zanabazar Square is a Unicode block containing characters from the Zanabazar Square script (also known as "Horizontal square script"), which is an abugida developed by the monk and scholar Zanabazar (1635–1723) to write Mongolian, Tibetan and Sanskrit.

== Block ==
Zanabazar Square^{[1]}^{[2]} Official Unicode Consortium code chart (PDF)
	0	1	2	3	4	5	6	7	8	9	A	B	C	D	E	F
U+11A0x	𑨀	𑨁	𑨂	𑨃	𑨄	𑨅	𑨆	𑨇	𑨈	𑨉	𑨊	𑨋	𑨌	𑨍	𑨎	𑨏
U+11A1x	𑨐	𑨑	𑨒	𑨓	𑨔	𑨕	𑨖	𑨗	𑨘	𑨙	𑨚	𑨛	𑨜	𑨝	𑨞	𑨟
U+11A2x	𑨠	𑨡	𑨢	𑨣	𑨤	𑨥	𑨦	𑨧	𑨨	𑨩	𑨪	𑨫	𑨬	𑨭	𑨮	𑨯
U+11A3x	𑨰	𑨱	𑨲	𑨳	𑨴	𑨵	𑨶	𑨷	𑨸	𑨹	𑨺	𑨻	𑨼	𑨽	𑨾	𑨿
U+11A4x	𑩀	𑩁	𑩂	𑩃	𑩄	𑩅	𑩆	𑩇								
Notes: 1. As of Unicode version 16.0; 2. Grey areas indicate non-assigned code points

== History ==
The following Unicode-related documents record the purpose and process of defining specific characters in the Zanabazar Square block:

Version	Final code points (Note: Proposed code points and characters names may differ from final code points and names)	Count	L2 ID	WG2 ID	Document
10.0	U+11A00..11A47	72	L2/10-411	N3956	Pandey, Anshuman (2010-10-25), Preliminary Proposal for Xawtaa Dorboljin Script in ISO/IEC 10646
10.0	U+11A00..11A47	72	L2/10-467		Sharma, Shriramana (2010-11-11), Comments on Soyombo and Xawtaa Dorboljin
10.0	U+11A00..11A47	72	L2/11-162	N4041	Pandey, Anshuman (2011-05-03), Preliminary Proposal to Encode the Mongolian Square Script
10.0	U+11A00..11A47	72	L2/11-379	N4160	Pandey, Anshuman (2011-10-24), Revised Preliminary Proposal to Encode the Mongolian Square Script
10.0	U+11A00..11A47	72	L2/13-068	N4413	Pandey, Anshuman (2013-04-22), Proposal to Encode the Mongolian Square Script
10.0	U+11A00..11A47	72	L2/13-086		Anderson, Deborah; McGowan, Rick; Whistler, Ken; Pournader, Roozbeh (2013-04-26), "5", Recommendations to UTC on Script Proposals
10.0	U+11A00..11A47	72	L2/13-085		Sharma, Shriramana (2013-04-28), Vocalic R etc in Mongolian Square
10.0	U+11A00..11A47	72	L2/13-198	N4471	Pandey, Anshuman (2013-10-27), Revised Proposal to Encode the Mongolian Square Script
10.0	U+11A00..11A47	72	L2/13-200		Moore, Lisa (2013-11-18), "D.7", UTC #137 Minutes
10.0	U+11A00..11A47	72	L2/14-024	N4541	Pandey, Anshuman (2014-01-22), Proposal to Encode the Zanabazar Square Script
10.0	U+11A00..11A47	72	L2/14-032		Anderson, Deborah (2014-01-25), Differences between L2/14-024 Zanabazar Script proposal and L2/13-198 Mongolian Square
10.0	U+11A00..11A47	72	L2/14-033	N4527	Sharma, Shriramana (2014-01-26), Comments on the Zanabazar Square proposal
10.0	U+11A00..11A47	72	L2/14-053		Anderson, Deborah; Whistler, Ken; McGowan, Rick; Pournader, Roozbeh; Iancu, Laurențiu (2014-01-26), "19", Recommendations to UTC #138 February 2014 on Script Proposals
10.0	U+11A00..11A47	72		N4403 (pdf, doc)	Umamaheswaran, V. S. (2014-01-28), "10.2.4 Mongolian Square script", Unconfirmed minutes of WG 2 meeting 61, Holiday Inn, Vilnius, Lithuania; 2013-06-10/14
10.0	U+11A00..11A47	72	L2/14-026		Moore, Lisa (2014-02-17), "Consensus 138-C13, 138-C26", UTC #138 Minutes
10.0	U+11A00..11A47	72		N4613	Comment on Zanabazar Square script in ISO/IEC 10646:2014 PDAM2, 2014-09-02
10.0	U+11A00..11A47	72		N4553 (pdf, doc)	Umamaheswaran, V. S. (2014-09-16), "M62.11", Minutes of WG 2 meeting 62 Adobe, San Jose, CA, USA
10.0	U+11A00..11A47	72	L2/14-250		Moore, Lisa (2014-11-10), "Consensus 141-C14", UTC #141 Minutes, "Change the name of character at U+11A29 from ZANABAZAR SQUARE LETTER SMALL A to ZANABAZAR SQUARE LETTER –A."
10.0	U+11A00..11A47	72	L2/15-009	N4653	Suzuki, Toshiya; Matsukawa, Takashi; Kuribayashi, Hitoshi (2015-01-26), Comments on Proposals of Zanabazar Square and Soyombo Script from Mongolian Experts
10.0	U+11A00..11A47	72	L2/15-094		Pandey, Anshuman (2015-02-09), Response to Mongolian and Japanese comments on Soyombo and Zanabazar Square
10.0	U+11A00..11A47	72	L2/15-149		Anderson, Deborah; Whistler, Ken; McGowan, Rick; Pournader, Roozbeh; Pandey, Anshuman; Glass, Andrew (2015-05-03), "9. Soyombo", Recommendations to UTC #143 May 2015 on Script Proposals
10.0	U+11A00..11A47	72	L2/16-052	N4603 (pdf, doc)	Umamaheswaran, V. S. (2015-09-01), "M63.03e", Unconfirmed minutes of WG 2 meeting 63, "Rename 11A29 to ZANABAZAR SQUARE LETTER -A"
10.0	U+11A00..11A47	72	L2/15-249R		Anderson, Deborah (2015-10-17), Summary of Ad Hoc Meeting on Two Historical Scripts from Mongolia (Tokyo, Japan)
10.0	U+11A00..11A47	72		N4699	Anderson, Deborah (2015-10-17), Summary of Ad Hoc Meeting on Two Historical Scripts from Mongolia (Tokyo, Japan)
10.0	U+11A00..11A47	72	L2/15-246		Pandey, Anshuman (2015-10-20), Revised code chart and names list for Zanabazar Square
10.0	U+11A00..11A47	72	L2/15-248		Otgonbaatar, R.; Demberel, S. (2015-10-20), The Comments on Square script & Soyombo encoding project
10.0	U+11A00..11A47	72	L2/15-262		Disposition of Comments on ISO/IEC CD 10646 (Ed.5), 2015-10-26
10.0	U+11A00..11A47	72	L2/15-254		Moore, Lisa (2015-11-16), "Consensus 145-C17", UTC #145 Minutes, "Approve new Zanabazar Square glyph changes, repertoire, code points, and names on the basis of CD2 draft, document L2/15-303."
10.0	U+11A00..11A47	72	L2/15-337		Pandey, Anshuman (2015-12-03), Proposal to Encode the Zanabazar Square Script
10.0	U+11A00..11A47	72	L2/15-336		Pandey, Anshuman (2015-12-07), Comments on L2/15-249 regarding Soyombo and Zanabazar Square punctuation
10.0	U+11A00..11A47	72	L2/15-341R		Pandey, Anshuman (2015-12-30), Proposal to encode additional head marks for Zanabazar Square
10.0	U+11A00..11A47	72	L2/15-342		Pandey, Anshuman (2015-12-30), Proposal to Encode a Subjoiner for Zanabazar Square
10.0	U+11A00..11A47	72	L2/16-037		Anderson, Deborah; Whistler, Ken; McGowan, Rick; Pournader, Roozbeh; Glass, Andrew; Iancu, Laurențiu (2016-01-22), "8.c", Recommendations to UTC #146 January 2016 on Script Proposals
10.0	U+11A00..11A47	72	L2/16-004		Moore, Lisa (2016-02-01), "D.9.1, D.9.2, D.9.3, D.10.2", UTC #146 Minutes
10.0	U+11A00..11A47	72		N4739	"M64.05i and j", Unconfirmed minutes of WG 2 meeting 64, 2016-08-31
