= Yig mgo =

A yig mgo is a textual caret mark in Tibetan script which is one of the possible markers for a new text or page. In some cases, such as following an internal title page, a triple yig mgo is used. Various forms of yig mgo are included in the Unicode character set for Tibetan, including:

- U+0F01 ༁ TIBETAN MARK GTER YIG MGO TRUNCATED A
- U+0F02 ༂ TIBETAN MARK GTER YIG MGO -UM RNAM BCAD MA
- U+0F03 ༃ TIBETAN MARK GTER YIG MGO -UM GTER TSHEG MA
- U+0F04 ༄ TIBETAN MARK INITIAL YIG MGO MDUN MA
- U+0F05 ༅ TIBETAN MARK CLOSING YIG MGO SGAB MA
- U+0F06 ༆ TIBETAN MARK CARET YIG MGO PHUR SHAD MA

== See also ==
- Javanese script, which also has various marks for beginning a text or a page that are used respectively by the reader's age or social status.
