= Thonmi Sambhota =

Minister of Songsten Gampo

Thönmi Sambhota
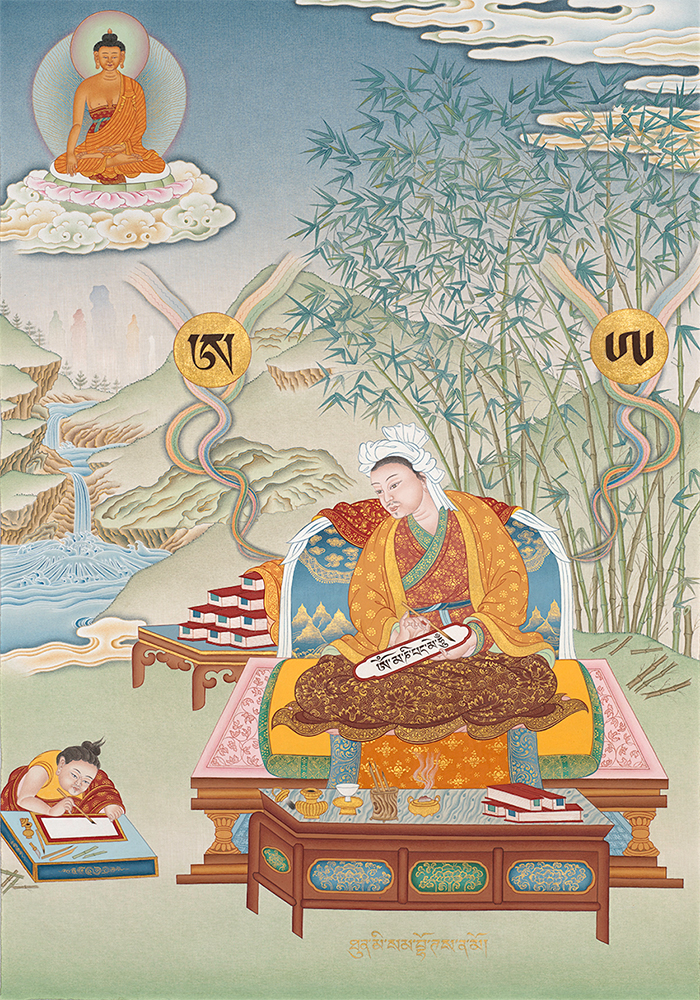
- Thönmi Sambhota ཐོན་མི་སམ་བྷོ་ཊ།

Personal life
- Born: c. 7th century Tu, Yorwo, Tibet
- Education: Nalanda

Religious life
- Religion: Mahayana Buddhism

Thonmi Sambhota (Tibetan: ཐོན་མི་སམ་བྷོ་ཊ།, Wylie: thon mi sam+b+ho Ta; born c. 7th century) is a figure credited by Tibetan traditions with creating the first Tibetan script, based on the Gupta alphabet, after being sent by king Songtsen Gampo to study in India. He is also credited with serving the king as his minister and escorting two princesses from Nepal and China into Tibet to become Songtsen Gampo's queens. The authenticity of this legend has been questioned.

== Traditional account ==
Thonmi is his clan name, while Sambhota means 'scholar' (sam) from Tibet (bhota). He was sent to India with 16 other Tibetan students to study Buddhism, Sanskrit, and the Art of Writing. Among his many accomplishments, he is also the author six important treatises on Tibetan grammar, two which are included in the Tengyur and are entitled (Wylie) lung ston pa la rtsa ba sum cu pa, and rtags kyi 'jug pa. Possibly re-edited by others at later dates, the two treatises attributed to him might postdate the 13th century. Some sources state that he was sent specifically to the monastery of Nalanda.

Scholar R. A. Stein states,

"According to Tibetan tradition, Songtsen Gampo sent a young man of the Thönmi or Thumi clan, Sambhoṭa son of Anu (or Drithorek Anu) to India in 632 with other youths, to learn the alphabet. The pattern chosen was the script of Kashmir. At all events, the ancient annals of Tun-huang record against the year 655 that 'the text of the laws was written'. It is staggering to realize that, in a couple of decades, not only was the Tibetan alphabet invented, but the script had been adapted to the Tibetan language by a highly complicated orthography, and used for the writing of documents. Thönmi is also said to have composed, no doubt later on, a very learned grammar on the Indian pattern."

Thonmi Sambhota became the fourth of seven wise ministers of King Songtsen Gampo. He is said to be the only one of the original 16 students to return to Tibet. The Tibetan script he devised in retreat, after his return to Tibet, was prepared at Kukarmaru Palace in Lhasa, and based on the Brahmi and Gupta scripts which have been in use in India since c.350.

King Songtsen Gampo is said to have retired for four years to master the new script and grammar. He then made translations of Buddhist texts, including the twenty-one Avalokitesvara texts. Other translators quickly added to the corpus of Buddhist translations.

The Six Codices of the Tibetan constitution were drawn up, and state documents included treaties with Tang China, and court records. Newly written domestic records included genealogies, histories, and poetry which were preserved in writing. The Chronicle of Ba, the keeping by the Ba clan members of royal records of important events during the Tibetan Empire era, also began c.650.

The first Tibetan dictionary followed in the 8th century, and was called the Drajor Bampo Nyipa (Madhyavyutpatti) that had 600 to 700 words, used by the panditas that were translating the Buddha Shakyamuni's recorded teachings into Tibetan for the Kangyur, and the commentaries by great masters into Tibetan for the Tengyur, which together created the Tibetan Buddhist Canon.

== Historical authenticity ==
Little is known about the exact origins of Tibetan script, which appears to have developed over a long period of time. It is difficult, if not impossible, to verify the existence of Thönmi Sambhoṭa, let alone his invention of any writing system. Earliest sources on Tibet, such as the Old Tibetan Chronicle, do not mention any Thönmi Sambhoṭa. The treatises credited to him by later Buddhist traditions were likely compiled over the decades following the reign of Songtsen Gampo.
