= Tibetan script =

Tibetan writing system

Tibetan བོད་ཡིག་
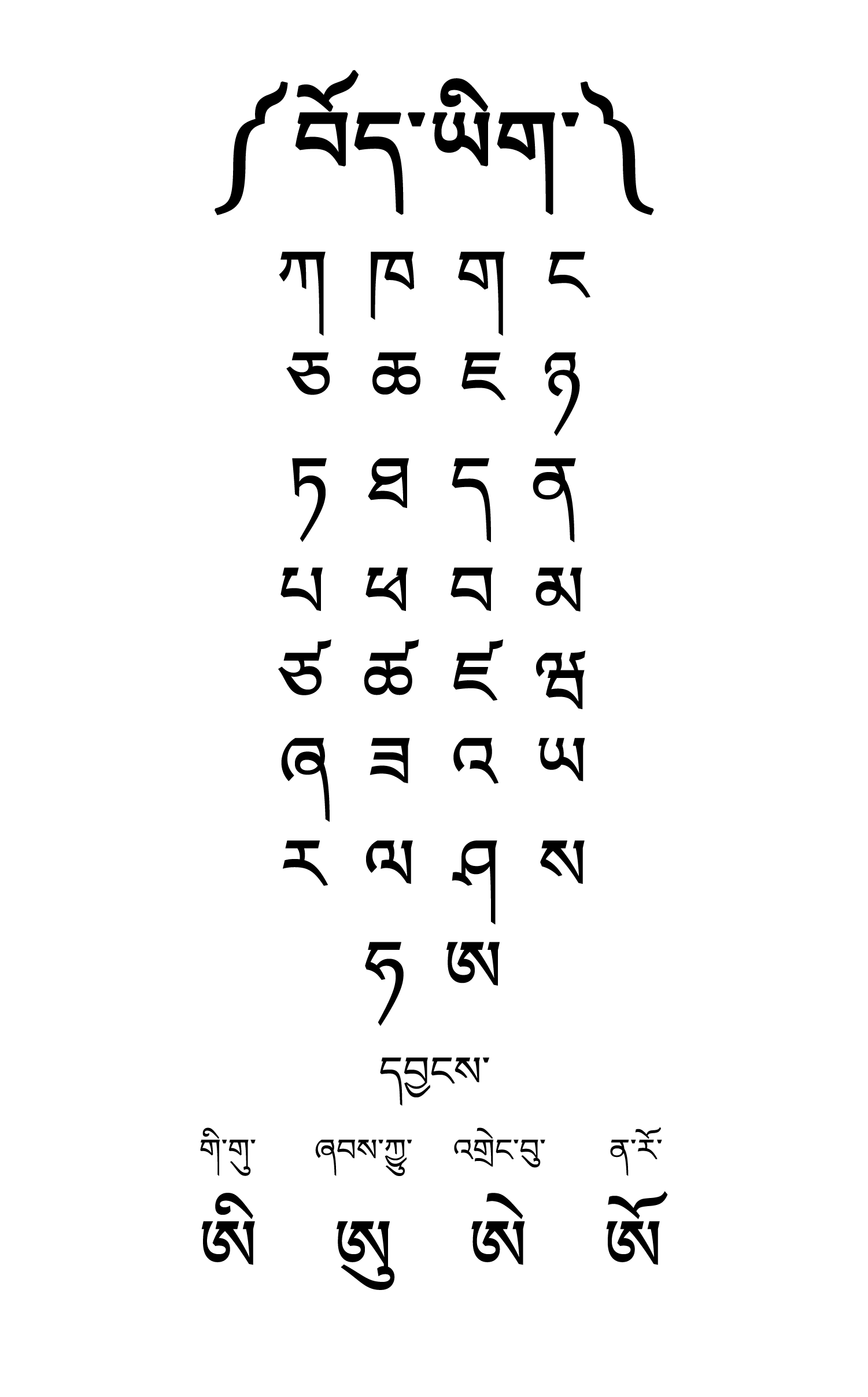
- Tibetan Choksat chart in Uchen style
- Script type: Abugida
- Period: c. 640–present
- Direction: Left-to-right
- Languages: Tibetan; Dzongkha; Ladakhi; Sikkimese; Balti; Sherpa; Jirel; Yolmo; Tshangla

Related scripts
- Parent systems: Egyptian hieroglyphs: Proto-Sinaitic; Phoenician; Aramaic; Brahmi; Northern Brahmi; Gupta; Tibetan
- Child systems: Lepcha; Khema; Phagspa; Marchen; Tamyig
- Sister systems: Meitei, Sharada, Siddham, Kalinga, Bhaiksuki

ISO 15924
- ISO 15924: Tibt (330), Tibetan

Unicode
- Unicode alias: Tibetan
- Unicode range: U+0F00–U+0FFF Final Accepted Script Proposal of the First Usable Edition (3.0)

The Tibetan script is a segmental writing system, or abugida, forming a part of the Brahmic scripts, and used to write certain Tibetic languages, including Tibetan, Dzongkha, Sikkimese, Ladakhi, Jirel and Balti. Its exact origins are a subject of research but it is traditionally considered to have been developed by Thonmi Sambhota for King Songtsen Gampo.

The Tibetan script has also been used for some non-Tibetic languages in close cultural contact with Tibet, such as Thakali and Nepali. The printed form is called uchen script while the hand-written form used in everyday writing is called umê script. This writing system is especially used across the Himalayan Region.

== History ==
Little is known about the exact origins of Tibetan script. According to Tibetan historiography, it was developed during the reign of King Songtsen Gampo by his minister Thonmi Sambhota, who was sent to India along with other scholars to study Buddhism along with Sanskrit. They developed the Tibetan script from the Gupta script while at the Pabonka Hermitage. This occurred c. 620, towards the beginning of Songtsen Gampo's reign. There were 21 Sutra texts held by the King which were translated afterwards. In the first half of the 7th century, the Tibetan script was used for the codification of these sacred Buddhist texts, for written civil laws, and for a Tibetan Constitution.

Earliest sources on Tibet, such as the Old Tibetan Chronicle, do not mention any Thonmi Sambhota. Scripts predating Songtsen Gampo might have existed but in any case do not appear to be widely used. Researchers postulate that Tibetan kings sought to develop a system of writing as their territory expanded. The script resembling the version today was likely developed in the second half of the 11th century. New research and writings also suggest that there were one or more Tibetan scripts in use prior to the introduction of the script by Songtsen Gampo and Thonmi Sambhota. The incomplete Dunhuang manuscripts are the key evidence for this hypothesis, while the few discovered and recorded Old Tibetan Annals manuscripts date from 650 and therefore post-date the c. 620 date of development of the original Tibetan script.

Van Schaik (2011) states that the Late Gupta script of Nepal and Northern India is to be considered as the most likely primary model for the Tibetan script. Van Schaik concludes that the Tibetan script was likely finalized in the 630s or 640s, around the time the Tibetan Empire began formally developing its written administrative system. Although Tönmi Sambhota’s historical existence cannot be confirmed, the evidence supports the idea that a Tibetan mission or similar effort went to India to study writing. The Tibetan script appears to have developed through two stages of Indic influence: early Gupta forms and later developments associated with Siddhamātṛkā. Van Schaik proposes that Late Gupta forms reached Tibet throughout the 6th century, after which the Tibetan court deliberately undertook a project to create a new script adapted to the phonetics of Tibetan, also incorporating new developments seen in the Siddhamātṛkā found in Northern india. This new script became the first version of the Tibetan script, attested later by inscriptions of the 8th century.

== Description ==
The mantra "Om mani padme hum"

=== Basic alphabet ===
In the Tibetan script, the syllables are written from left to right. Syllables are separated by a tsek (་); since many Tibetan words are monosyllabic, this mark often functions almost as a space. Spaces are not used to divide words.

The Tibetan alphabet has thirty letters, sometimes known as "radicals", for consonants. As in other Indic scripts, each consonant letter assumes an inherent vowel; in the Tibetan script it is /a/. The letter ཨ is also the base for dependent vowel marks.

Although some Tibetan dialects are tonal, the language had no tone at the time of the script's invention, and there are no dedicated symbols for tone. However, since tones developed from segmental features, they can usually be correctly predicted by the archaic spelling of Tibetan words.

	Unaspirated high		Aspirated medium		Voiced low		Nasal low	
	Letter	IPA	Letter	IPA	Letter	IPA	Letter	IPA
Guttural	ཀ	/ka/	ཁ	/kʰa/	ག (Note: These voiced values are historical. They have been devoiced in modern Standard Tibetan.)	/ɡa/	ང	/ŋa/
Palatal	ཅ	/tʃa/	ཆ	/tʃʰa/	ཇ	/dʒa/	ཉ	/ɲa/
Dental	ཏ	/ta/	ཐ	/tʰa/	ད	/da/	ན	/na/
Labial	པ	/pa/	ཕ	/pʰa/	བ	/ba/	མ	/ma/
Dental	ཙ	/tsa/	ཚ	/tsʰa/	ཛ	/dza/	ཝ	/wa/
low	ཞ	/ʒa/	ཟ	/za/	འ	/ɦa/ ⟨ʼa⟩	ཡ	/ja/
medium	ར	/ra/	ལ	/la/	ཤ	/ʃa/	ས	/sa/
high	ཧ	/ha/	ཨ	/a/ ⟨ꞏa⟩				

=== Consonant clusters ===
Components of a Tibetan syllable

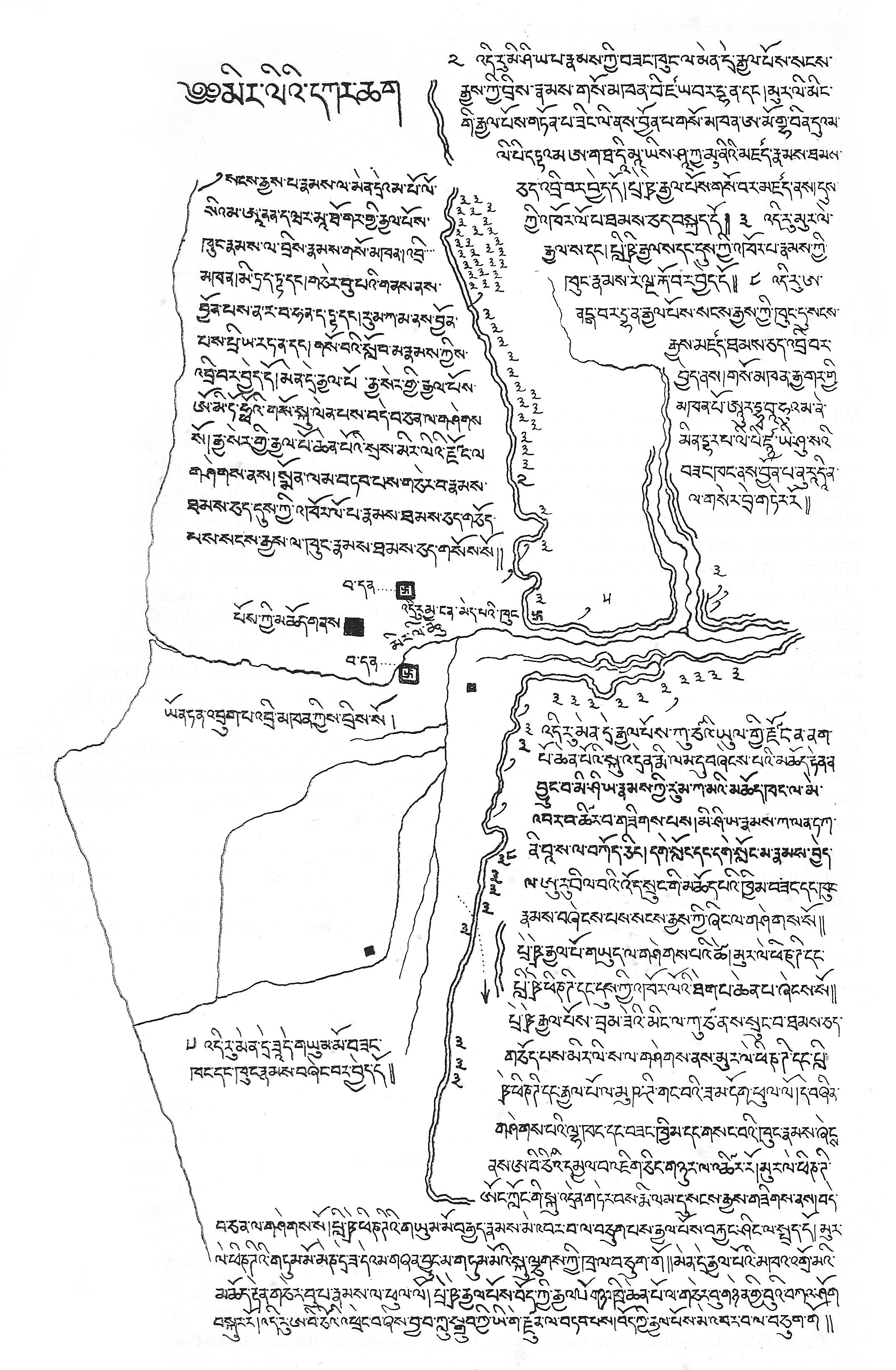
Tibetan map of the Kizil Caves, Tarim Basin. 13th century CE

One aspect of the Tibetan script is that the consonants can be written either as radicals or they can be written in other forms, such as subscript and superscript forming consonant clusters.

To understand how this works, one can look at the radical ཀ /ka/ and see what happens when it becomes ཀྲ /kra/ or རྐ /rka/ (pronounced /ka/). In both cases, the symbol for ཀ /ka/ is used, but when the ར /ra/ is in the middle of the consonant and vowel, it is added as a subscript. On the other hand, when the ར /ra/ comes before the consonant and vowel, it is added as a superscript. ར /ra/ actually changes form when it is above most other consonants, thus རྐ rka. However, an exception to this is the cluster རྙ /rɲa/. Similarly, the consonants ར /ra/, and ཡ /ja/ change form when they are beneath other consonants, thus ཀྲ /ʈ ~ ʈʂa/; ཀྱ /ca/.

Besides being written as subscripts and superscripts, some consonants can also be placed in prescript, postscript, or post-postscript positions. For instance, the consonants ག /kʰa/, ད /tʰa/, བ /pʰa/, མ /ma/ and འ /a/ can be used in the prescript position to the left of other radicals, while the position after a radical (the postscript position), can be held by the ten consonants ག /kʰa/, ན /na/, བ /pʰa/, ད /tʰa/, མ /ma/, འ /a/, ར /ra/, ང /ŋa/, ས /sa/, and ལ /la/. The third position, the post-postscript position is solely for the consonants ད /tʰa/ and ས /sa/.

==== Head letters ====
The head (མགོ in Tibetan, Wylie: mgo) letter, or superscript, position above a radical is reserved for the consonants ར /ra/, ལ /la/, and ས /sa/.

- When ར /ra/, ལ /la/, and ས /sa/ are in superscript position with ཀ /ka/, ཅ /t͡ʃa/, ཏ /ta/, པ /pa/ and ཙ /t͡sa/, there are no changes to their sounds in Lhasa Tibetan, for example:
  - རྐ /ka/, རྟ /ta/, རྤ /pa/, རྩ /t͡sa/
  - ལྐ /ka/, ལྕ /t͡ʃa/, ལྟ /ta/, ལྤ /pa/,
  - སྐ /ka/, སྟ /ta/, སྤ /pa/, སྩ /t͡sa/
- When ར /ra/, ལ /la/, and ས /sa/ are in superscript position with ག /kʰa/, ཇ /t͡ʃʰa/, ད /tʰa/, བ /pʰa/ and ཛ /t͡sʰa/, they lose their aspiration and become voiced in Lhasa Tibetan, for example:
  - རྒ /ga/, རྗ /d͡ʒa/, རྡ /da/, རྦ /ba/, རྫ /dza/
  - ལྒ /ga/, ལྗ /d͡ʒa/, ལྡ /da/, ལྦ /ba/,
  - སྒ /ga/, སྡ /da/, སྦ /ba/
- When ར /ra/, ལ /la/, and ས /sa/ are in superscript position with the nasal consonants ང /ŋa/, ཉ /ɲa/, ན /na/ and མ /ma/, they receive a high tone in Lhasa Tibetan, for example:
  - རྔ /ŋa/, རྙ /ɲa/, རྣ /na/, རྨ /ma/
  - ལྔ /ŋa/
  - སྔ /ŋa/, སྙ /ɲa/, སྣ /na/, སྨ /ma/
- When ལ /la/ is in superscript position with ཧ /ha/, it becomes a voiceless alveolar lateral approximant in Lhasa Tibetan:
  - ལྷ /l̥a/,

==== Sub-joined letters ====
The subscript position under a radical can only be occupied by the consonants ཡ /ja/, ར /ra/, ལ /la/, and ཝ /wa/. In this position they are described as བཏགས (Wylie: btags, IPA: /taʔ/), in Tibetan meaning "hung on/affixed/appended", for example བ་ཡ་བཏགས་བྱ (IPA: /pʰa.ja.taʔ.t͡ʃʰa/), except for ཝ, which is simply read as it usually is and has no effect on the pronunciation of the consonant to which it is subjoined, for example ཀ་ཝ་ཟུར་ཀྭ (IPA: /ka.wa.suː.ka/).

=== Vowel marks ===
The vowels used in the alphabet are ཨ /a/, ཨི /i/, ཨུ /u/, ཨེ /e/, and ཨོ /o/. While the vowel /a/ is included in each consonant, the other vowels are indicated by marks; thus ཀ /ka/, ཀི /ki/, ཀུ /ku/, ཀེ /ke/, ཀོ /ko/. The vowels ཨི /i/, ཨེ /e/, and ཨོ /o/ are placed above consonants as diacritics, while the vowel ཨུ /u/ is placed underneath consonants. Old Tibetan included a reversed form of the mark for /i/, the gigu 'verso', of uncertain meaning. There is no distinction between long and short vowels in written Tibetan, except in loanwords (especially those borrowed from Sanskrit).

Vowel mark	IPA	Vowel mark	IPA	Vowel mark	IPA	Vowel mark	IPA
ི	/i/	ུ	/u/	ེ	/e/	ོ	/o/

=== Numerical digits ===
Tibetan numerals	༠	༡	༢	༣	༤	༥	༦	༧	༨	༩
Devanagari numerals	०	१	२	३	४	५	६	७	८	९
Arabic numerals	0	1	2	3	4	5	6	7	8	9
Tibetan fractions	༳	༪	༫	༬	༭	༮	༯	༰	༱	༲
Decimal fractions	-0.5	0.5	1.5	2.5	3.5	4.5	5.5	6.5	7.5	8.5

=== Punctuation marks ===
Symbol/ Graphemes	Name	Function
༄༅། །	ཡིག་མགོ yig mgo	marks beginning of a text, before a headline, front page of a pecha
༃	གཏེར་ཡིག་མགོ gter yig mgo	used in place of the yig mgo in terma texts
༁	ཡིག་མགོ་ཨ་ཕྱེད yig mgo a phyed	used in place of the yig mgo in terma texts
༆	དཔེ་རྙིང་ཡིག་མགོ dpe rnying yig mgo	a variant of the yig mgo found in very old Tibetan texts
༉	བསྐུར་ཡིག་མགོ bskur yig mgo	list enumerator (Dzongka)
་	ཚེག tseg	syllable delimiter, also used as a spacer to justify text in pechas
།	ཤད shad	full stop, comma, or semicolon (marks end of a sentence or clause, and originates from the daṇḍa of Indic scripts)
། །	ཉིས་ཤད nyis shad	marks end of a paragraph or topic (cp. pilcrow)
༎ །།	བཞི་ཤད bzhi shad	marks end of a chapter or entire section
། །།	གསུམ་ཤད gsum shad	same as bzhi shad, but used when the preceding character is ཀ or ག
༑	རིན་ཆེན་སྤུངས་ཤད rin chen spungs shad	replaces shad after single, orphaned syllables, indicating to the reader that the preceding syllable continues from text on the previous line
༏	ཚེག་ཤད tsheg shad	variant of rin chen spungs shad
༐	ཉིསཚེག་ཤད nyis tsheg shad	variant of rin chen spungs shad
༈	སྦྲུལ་ཤད sbrul shad	marks the start of a new text, often in a collection of texts, separates chapters, and surrounds inserted text
༔	གཏེར་ཤད gter shad	replaces shad and variants thereof in terma texts
༒	རྒྱ་གྲམ་ཤད rgya gram shad	sometimes used in place of the yig mgo in terma texts
༸	ཆེ་མགོ che mgo	literally, "big head"—used preceding a reference to the Dalai Lama or the name of another important lama or tulku that demands great respect
༴	བསྡུས་རྟགས bsdus rtags	repetition
༓	འཛུད་རྟགས་མེ་ལོང་ཅན 'dzud rtags me long can	caret (indicates text insertion)
༼	ཨང་ཁང་གཡོན་འཁོར ang khang g.yon 'khor	left roof bracket
༽	ཨང་ཁང་གཡས་འཁོར ang khang g.yas 'khor	right roof bracket
༺	གུག་རྟགས་གཡོན gug rtags g.yon	left bracket
༻	གུག་རྟགས་གཡས gug rtags g.yas	right bracket

== Extended use ==
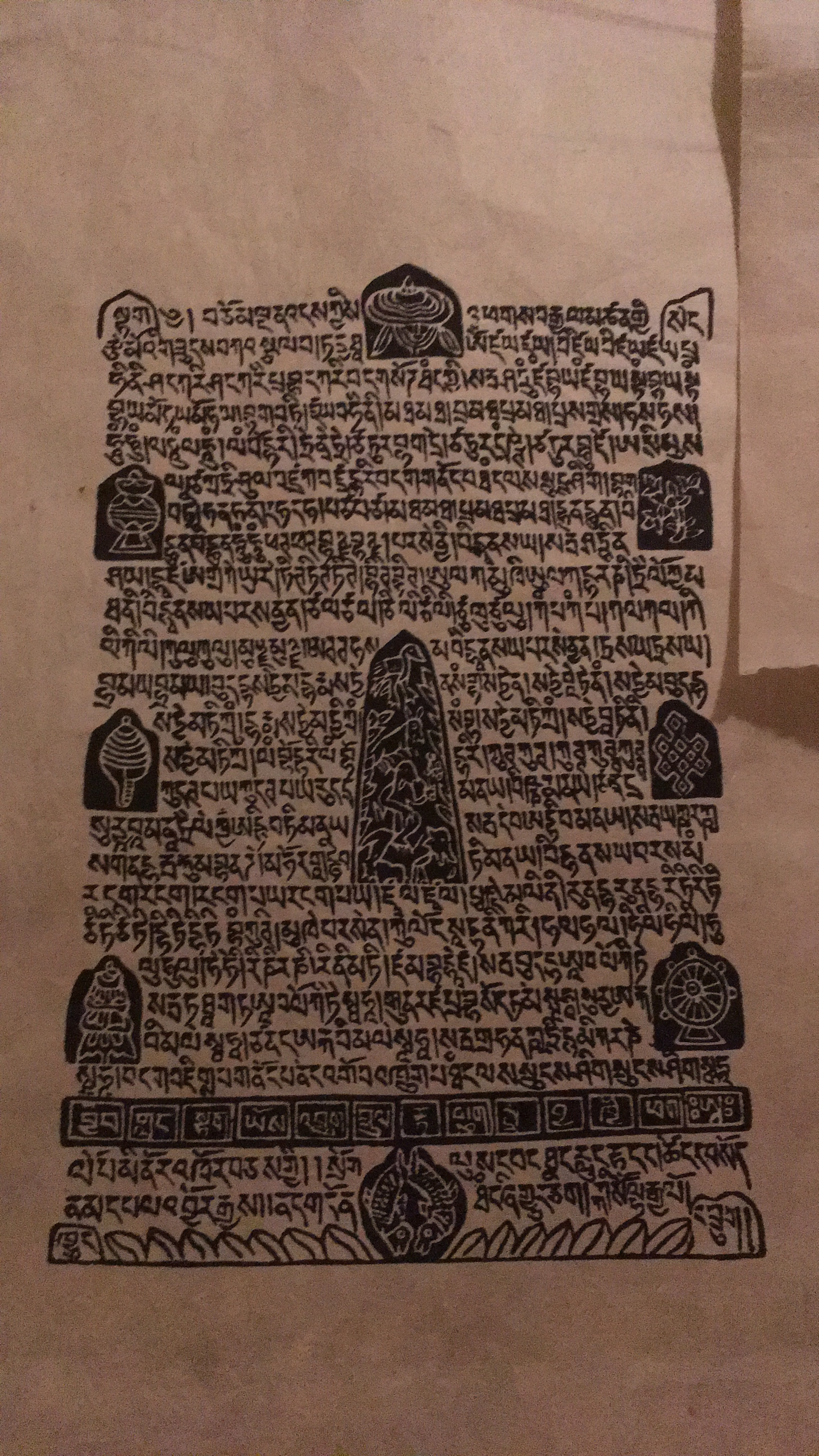
A bilingual text (Tibetan and Sanskrit) written in Tibetan script. From the personal artifact collection of Donald Weir.

The Tibetan alphabet, when used to write other languages such as Balti, Chinese and Sanskrit, often has additional and/or modified graphemes taken from the basic Tibetan alphabet to represent different sounds.

=== Extended alphabet ===
Letter	Used in	Romanization	IPA	Comments
ཫ	Balti	qa	/qa/	reversed ཀ (ka)
ཬ	Balti	ṛa	/ɽa/	reversed ར (ra)
ཁ༹	Balti	xa	/χa/	ཁ (kha) with tsa phru
ག༹	Balti	ġa	/ʁa/	ག (ga) with tsa phru
ཕ༹	Chinese	fa	/fa/	ཕ (pha) with tsa phru
བ༹	Chinese	va	/va/	བ (ba) with tsa phru
གྷ	Sanskrit	gha	/ɡʱa/	ག (ga) with subjoined ཧ (ha)
ཛྷ	Sanskrit	dzha	/d͡zʱa/	ཛ (dza) with subjoined ཧ (ha)
ཊ	Sanskrit	ṭa	/ʈa/	reversed ཏ (ta)
ཋ	Sanskrit	ṭha	/ʈʰa/	reversed ཐ (tha)
ཌ	Sanskrit	ḍa	/ɖa/	reversed ད (da)
ཌྷ	Sanskrit	ḍha	/ɖʱa/	ཌ (ḍa) with subjoined ཧ (ha)
ཎ	Sanskrit	ṇa	/ɳa/	reversed ན (na)
དྷ	Sanskrit	dha	/dʱa/	ད (da) with subjoined ཧ (ha)
བྷ	Sanskrit	bha	/bʱa/	བ (ba) with subjoined ཧ (ha)
ཥ	Sanskrit	ṣa	/ʂa/	reversed ཤ (sha)
ཀྵ	Sanskrit	kṣa	/kʂa/	ཀ (ka) with subjoined ཥ (ṣa)
ྈྐ	(Vedic) Sanskrit	ẖka	/xka/	jihvāmūlīya: velar visarga before ཀ (ka) and ཁ (kha)
ྈྑ	(Vedic) Sanskrit	ẖkha	/xkʰa/	jihvāmūlīya: velar visarga before ཀ (ka) and ཁ (kha)
ྉྤ	(Vedic) Sanskrit	ḫpa	/ɸpa/	upadhmānīya: labial visarga before པ (pa) and ཕ (pha)
ྉྥ	(Vedic) Sanskrit	ḫpha	/ɸpʰa/	upadhmānīya: labial visarga before པ (pa) and ཕ (pha)

- It is a classical rule to transliterate Sanskrit ca, cha, ja and jha as Tibetan ཙ (tsa), ཚ (tsha), ཛ (dza) and ཛྷ (dzha), respectively, rather than ཅ (ca), ཆ (cha), ཇ (ja) and ཇྷ (jha).
- Five of the Sanskrit retroflex consonants, ཊ (ṭa), ཋ (ṭha), ཌ (ḍa), ཎ (ṇa) and ཥ (ṣa), are represented by reversed forms of their non-retroflex counterparts, ཏ (ta), ཐ (tha), ད (da), ན (na) and ཤ (sha). One further retroflex, ཌྷ (ḍha), is formed by subjoining retroflex ཌ (ḍa) with ཧ (ha), matching the way its non-retroflex counterpart, དྷ (dha), is formed from ད (da) subjoined with ཧ (ha).

=== Extended vowel marks and modifiers ===
Vowel Mark	Used in	Romanization & IPA	Function
ཱ	Sanskrit	ā /aː/	length mark for vowel a
ཱི	Sanskrit	ī /iː/	length mark for vowel i
ཱུ	Sanskrit	ū /uː/	length mark for vowel u
ྲྀ	Sanskrit	ṛ /r̩/	marks vocalic r
ྲཱྀ	Sanskrit	ṝ /r̩ː/	marks long vocalic r
ླྀ	Sanskrit	ḷ /l̩/	marks vocalic l
ླཱྀ	Sanskrit	ḹ /l̩ː/	marks long vocalic l
ཻ	Sanskrit	ai /ɐi̯/	marks the diphthong ai
ཽ	Sanskrit	au /ɐu̯/	marks the diphthong au
ཾ	Sanskrit	ṃ /◌̃/	anusvara; marks nasalization or a final nasal sound depending on context
ྃ	Sanskrit	m̐ /◌̃/	chandrabindu; marks a nasalized vowel
ཿ	Sanskrit	ḥ /h/	visarga; marks post-vocalic breath

Symbol/ Graphemes	Name	Used in	Function
྄	srog med	Sanskrit	virama: suppresses the inherent vowel sound
྅	paluta	Sanskrit	avagraha: used for prolonging vowel sounds

=== Consonant clusters ===
In addition to the use of supplementary graphemes, the rules for constructing consonant clusters are amended, allowing any character to occupy the superscript or subscript position, negating the need for the prescript and postscript positions.

== Romanization and transliteration ==
Romanization and transliteration of the Tibetan script is the representation of the Tibetan script in the Latin script. Multiple Romanization and transliteration systems have been created in recent years, but do not fully represent the true phonetic sound. (Note: See for instance) While the Wylie transliteration system is widely used to Romanize Standard Tibetan, others include the Library of Congress system and the IPA-based transliteration (Jacques 2012).

Below is a table with Tibetan letters and different Romanization and transliteration system for each letter, listed below systems are: Wylie transliteration (W), Tibetan pinyin (TP), Dzongkha phonetic (DP), ALA-LC Romanization (A) and THL Simplified Phonetic Transcription (THL).

Letter	W	TP	DP	A	THL	Letter	W	TP	DP	A	THL	Letter	W	TP	DP	A	THL	Letter	W	TP	DP	A	THL
ཀ	ka	g	ka	ka	ka	ཁ	kha	k	kha	kha	kha	ག	ga*	k*	kha*	ga*	ga*	ང	nga	ng	nga	nga	nga
ཅ	ca	j	ca	ca	cha	ཆ	cha	q	cha	cha	cha	ཇ	ja*	q*	cha*	ja*	ja*	ཉ	nya	ny	nya	nya	nya
ཏ	ta	d	ta	ta	ta	ཐ	tha	t	tha	tha	ta	ད	da*	t*	tha*	da*	da*	ན	na	n	na	na	na
པ	pa	b	pa	pa	pa	ཕ	pha	p	pha	pha	pa	བ	ba*	p*	pha*	ba*	ba*	མ	ma	m	ma	ma	ma
ཙ	tsa	z	tsa	tsa	tsa	ཚ	tsha	c	tsha	tsha	tsa	ཛ	dza*	c*	tsha*	dza*	dza*	ཝ	wa	w	wa	wa	wa
ཞ	zha*	x*	sha*	zha*	zha*	ཟ	za*	s*	sa*	za*	za*	འ	'a	-	a	'a	a	ཡ	ya	y	ya	ya	ya
ར	ra	r	ra	ra	ra	ལ	la	l	la	la	la	ཤ	sha	x	sha	sha	sha	ས	sa	s	sa	sa	sa
ཧ	ha	h	ha	ha	ha	ཨ	a	a	a	a	a												
* – Only in loanwords

== Input method and keyboard layout ==
=== Tibetan ===
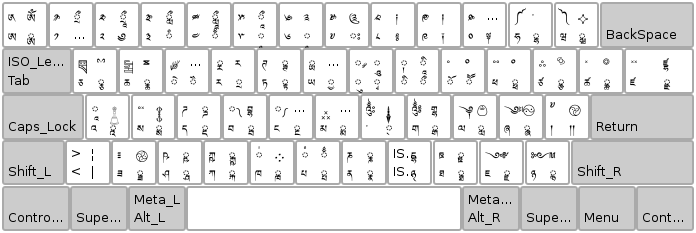
Tibetan keyboard layout

The first version of Microsoft Windows to support the Tibetan keyboard layout is MS Windows Vista. The layout has been available in Linux since September 2007. In Ubuntu 12.04, one can install Tibetan language support through Dash / Language Support / Install/Remove Languages, the input method can be turned on from Dash / Keyboard Layout, adding Tibetan keyboard layout. The layout applies the similar layout as in Microsoft Windows.

Mac OS X introduced Tibetan Unicode support in version 10.5, now with three different keyboard layouts available: Tibetan-Wylie, Tibetan QWERTY and Tibetan-Otani.

=== Dzongkha ===
Dzongkha keyboard layout

The Dzongkha keyboard layout scheme is designed as a simple means for inputting Dzongkha text on computers. This keyboard layout was standardized by the Dzongkha Development Commission (DDC) and the Department of Information Technology (DIT) of the Royal Government of Bhutan in 2000.

It was updated in 2009 to accommodate additional characters added to the Unicode and ISO 10646 standards since the initial version. Since the arrangement of keys essentially follows the usual order of the Dzongka and Tibetan alphabet, the layout can be quickly learned by anyone familiar with this alphabet. Subjoined (combining) consonants are entered using the Shift key.

The Dzongka keyboard layout is included in Microsoft Windows, Android, and most distributions of Linux as part of XFree86.

== Unicode ==
Tibetan was originally one of the scripts in the first version of the Unicode Standard in 1991, in the Unicode block U+1000–U+104F. However, in 1993, in version 1.1, it was removed (the code points it took up would later be used for the Burmese script in version 3.0). The Tibetan script was re-added in July, 1996 with the release of version 2.0.

The Unicode block for Tibetan is U+0F00–U+0FFF. It includes letters, digits and various punctuation marks and special symbols used in religious texts:

Tibetan^{[1]}^{[2]}^{[3]} Official Unicode Consortium code chart (PDF)
	0	1	2	3	4	5	6	7	8	9	A	B	C	D	E	F
U+0F0x	ༀ	༁	༂	༃	༄	༅	༆	༇	༈	༉	༊	་	༌ NB	།	༎	༏
U+0F1x	༐	༑	༒	༓	༔	༕	༖	༗	༘	༙	༚	༛	༜	༝	༞	༟
U+0F2x	༠	༡	༢	༣	༤	༥	༦	༧	༨	༩	༪	༫	༬	༭	༮	༯
U+0F3x	༰	༱	༲	༳	༴	༵	༶	༷	༸	༹	༺	༻	༼	༽	༾	༿
U+0F4x	ཀ	ཁ	ག	གྷ	ང	ཅ	ཆ	ཇ		ཉ	ཊ	ཋ	ཌ	ཌྷ	ཎ	ཏ
U+0F5x	ཐ	ད	དྷ	ན	པ	ཕ	བ	བྷ	མ	ཙ	ཚ	ཛ	ཛྷ	ཝ	ཞ	ཟ
U+0F6x	འ	ཡ	ར	ལ	ཤ	ཥ	ས	ཧ	ཨ	ཀྵ	ཪ	ཫ	ཬ			
U+0F7x		ཱ	ི	ཱི	ུ	ཱུ	ྲྀ	ཷ	ླྀ	ཹ	ེ	ཻ	ོ	ཽ	ཾ	ཿ
U+0F8x	ྀ	ཱྀ	ྂ	ྃ	྄	྅	྆	྇	ྈ	ྉ	ྊ	ྋ	ྌ	ྍ	ྎ	ྏ
U+0F9x	ྐ	ྑ	ྒ	ྒྷ	ྔ	ྕ	ྖ	ྗ		ྙ	ྚ	ྛ	ྜ	ྜྷ	ྞ	ྟ
U+0FAx	ྠ	ྡ	ྡྷ	ྣ	ྤ	ྥ	ྦ	ྦྷ	ྨ	ྩ	ྪ	ྫ	ྫྷ	ྭ	ྮ	ྯ
U+0FBx	ྰ	ྱ	ྲ	ླ	ྴ	ྵ	ྶ	ྷ	ྸ	ྐྵ	ྺ	ྻ	ྼ		྾	྿
U+0FCx	࿀	࿁	࿂	࿃	࿄	࿅	࿆	࿇	࿈	࿉	࿊	࿋	࿌		࿎	࿏
U+0FDx	࿐	࿑	࿒	࿓	࿔	࿕	࿖	࿗	࿘	࿙	࿚					
U+0FEx																
U+0FFx																
Notes 1.As of Unicode version 17.0 2.Grey areas indicate non-assigned code points 3.Unicode code points U+0F77 and U+0F79 are deprecated in Unicode 5.2 and later

== Gallery ==
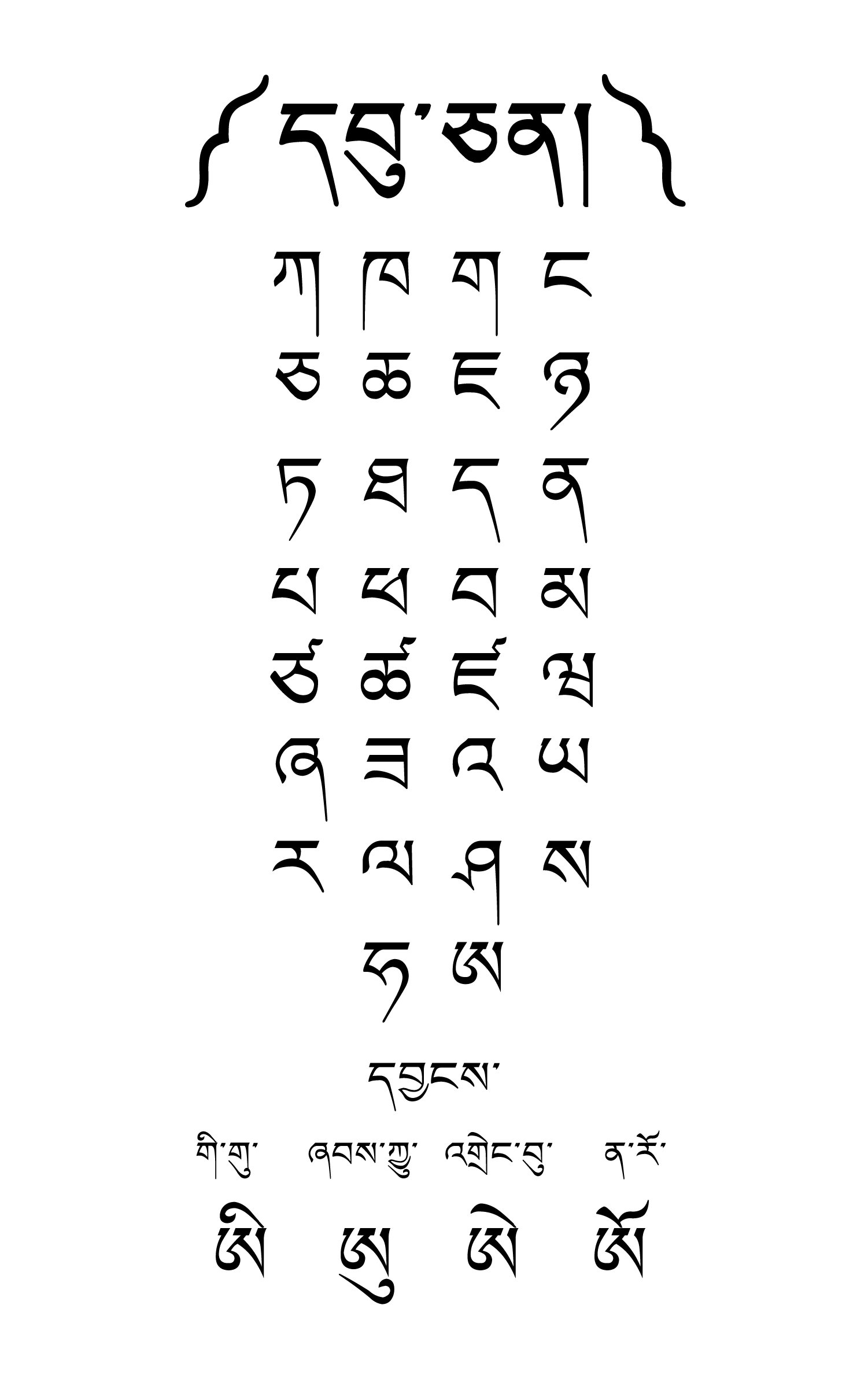
Tibetan Choksat (Alphabet) in Uchen style

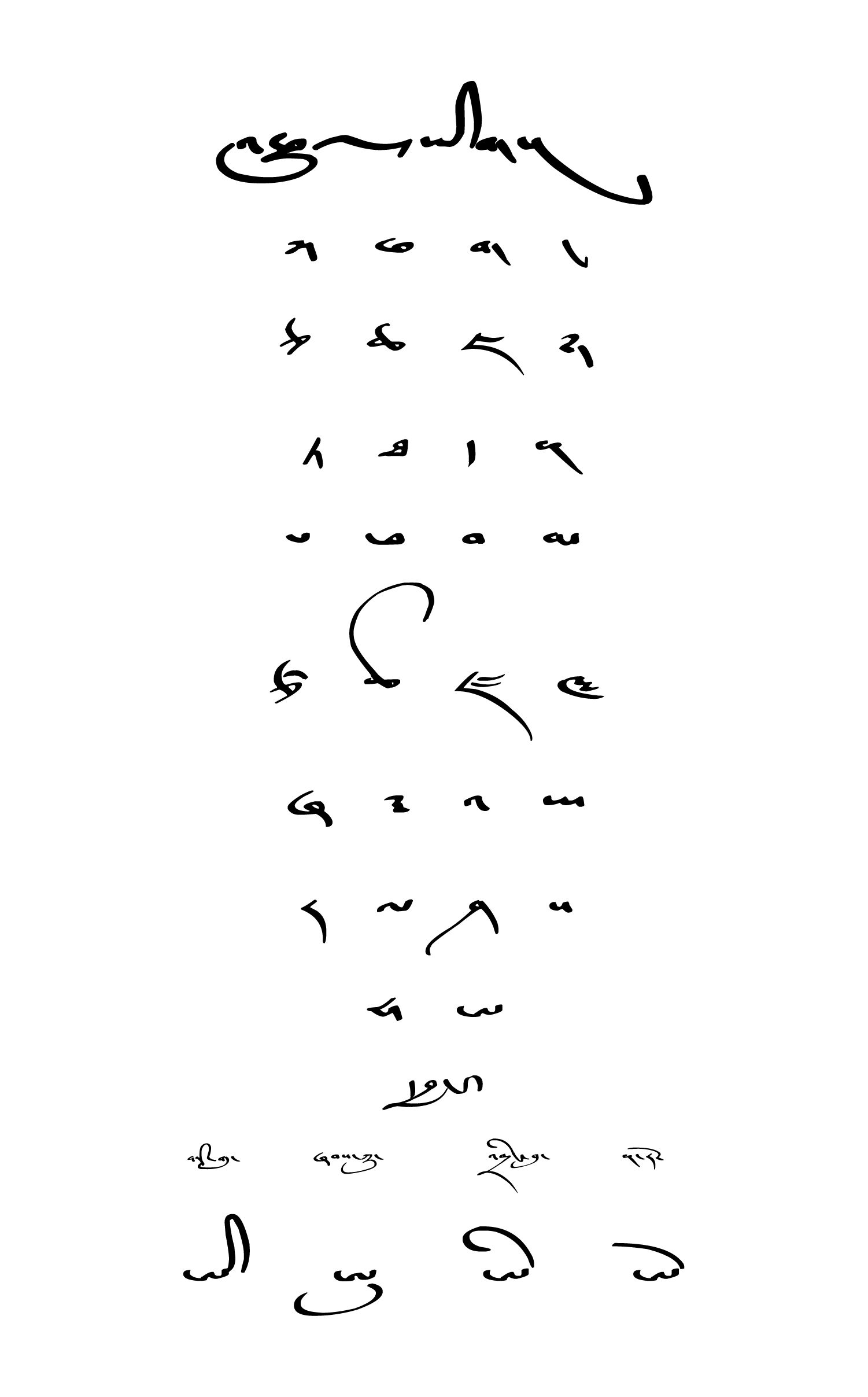
Tibetan Choksat (Alphabet) in Chugyig cursive style

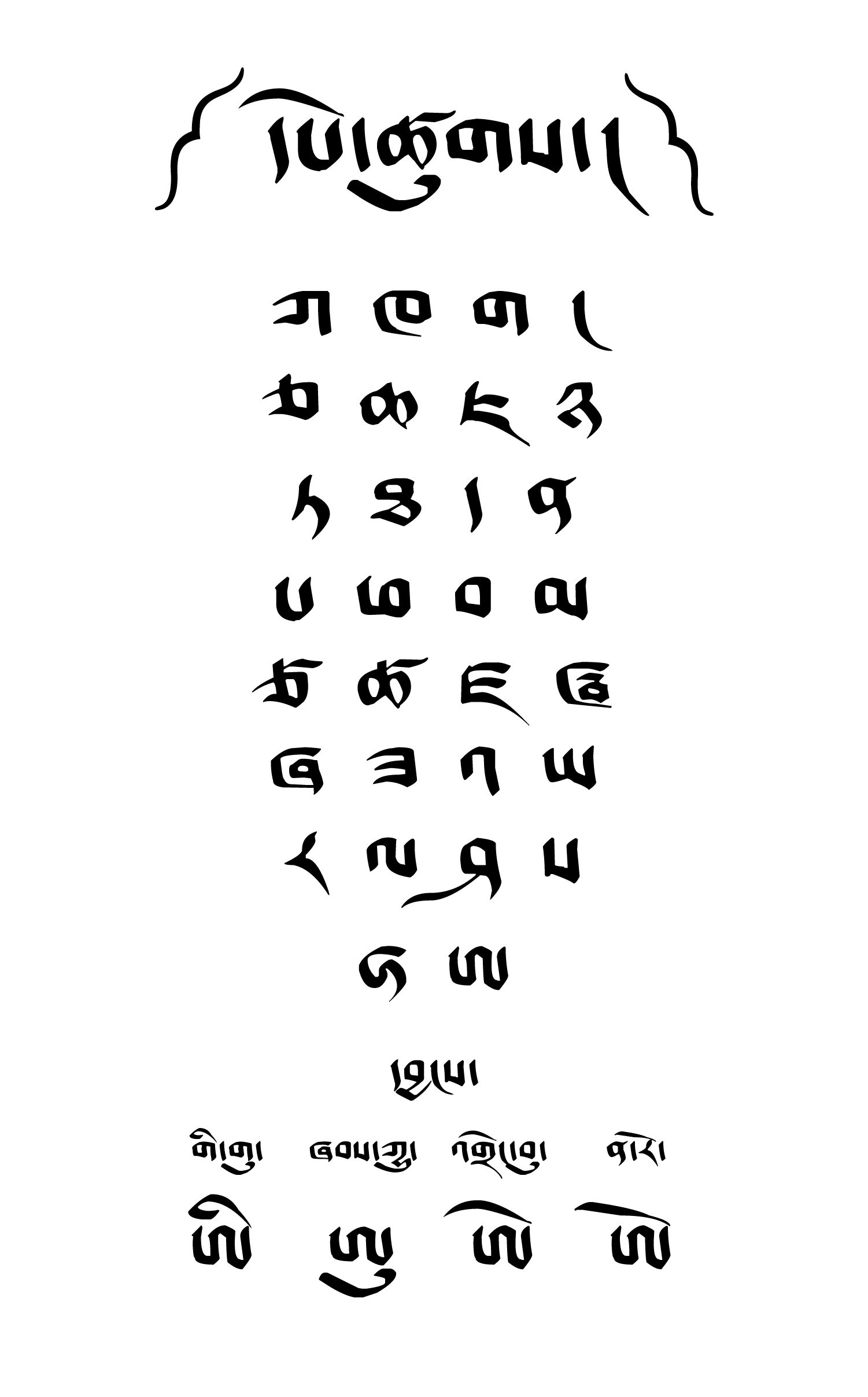
Tibetan Choksat (Alphabet) in Bêtsug cursive style

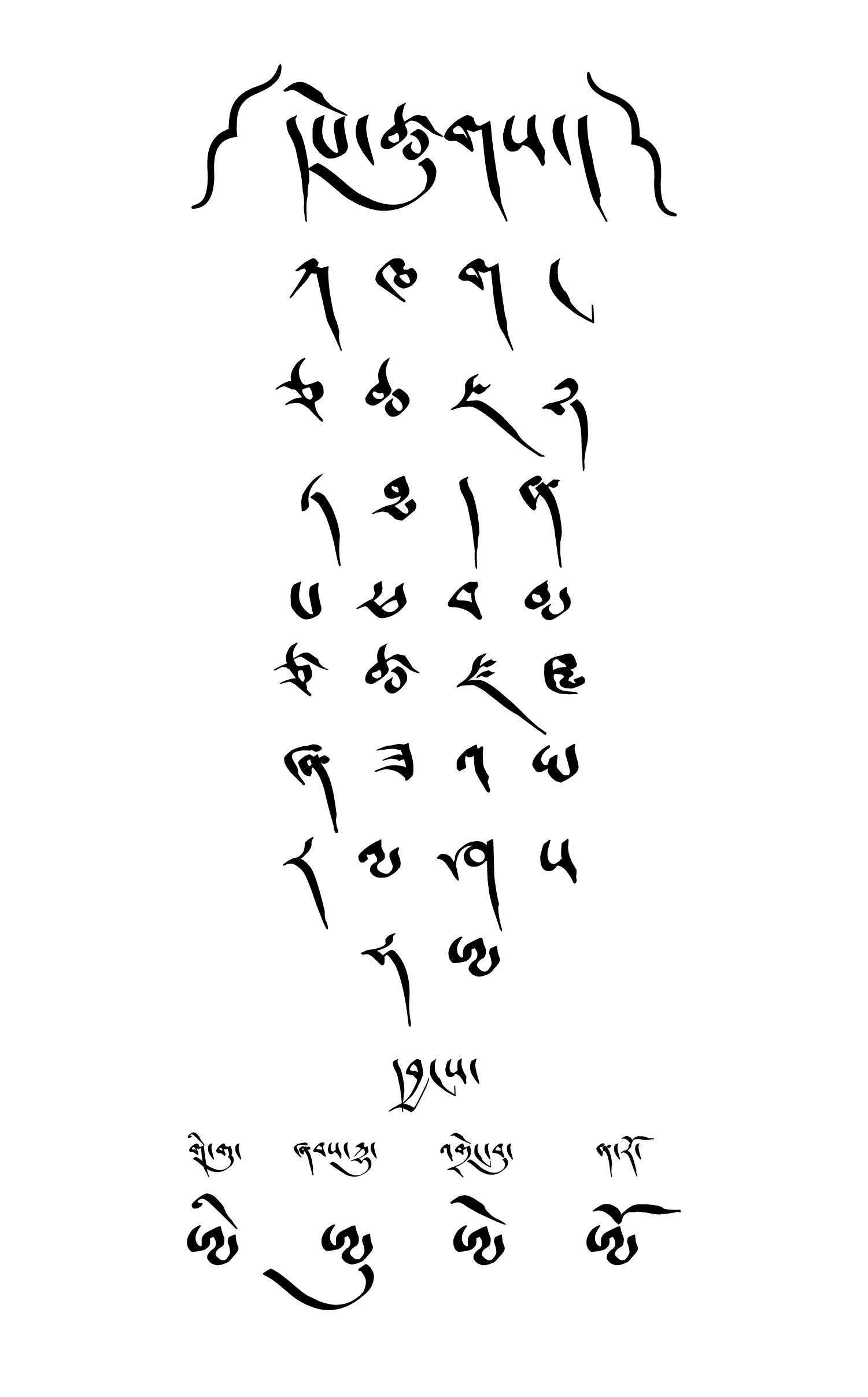
Tibetan Choksat (Alphabet) in Drutsa cursive style

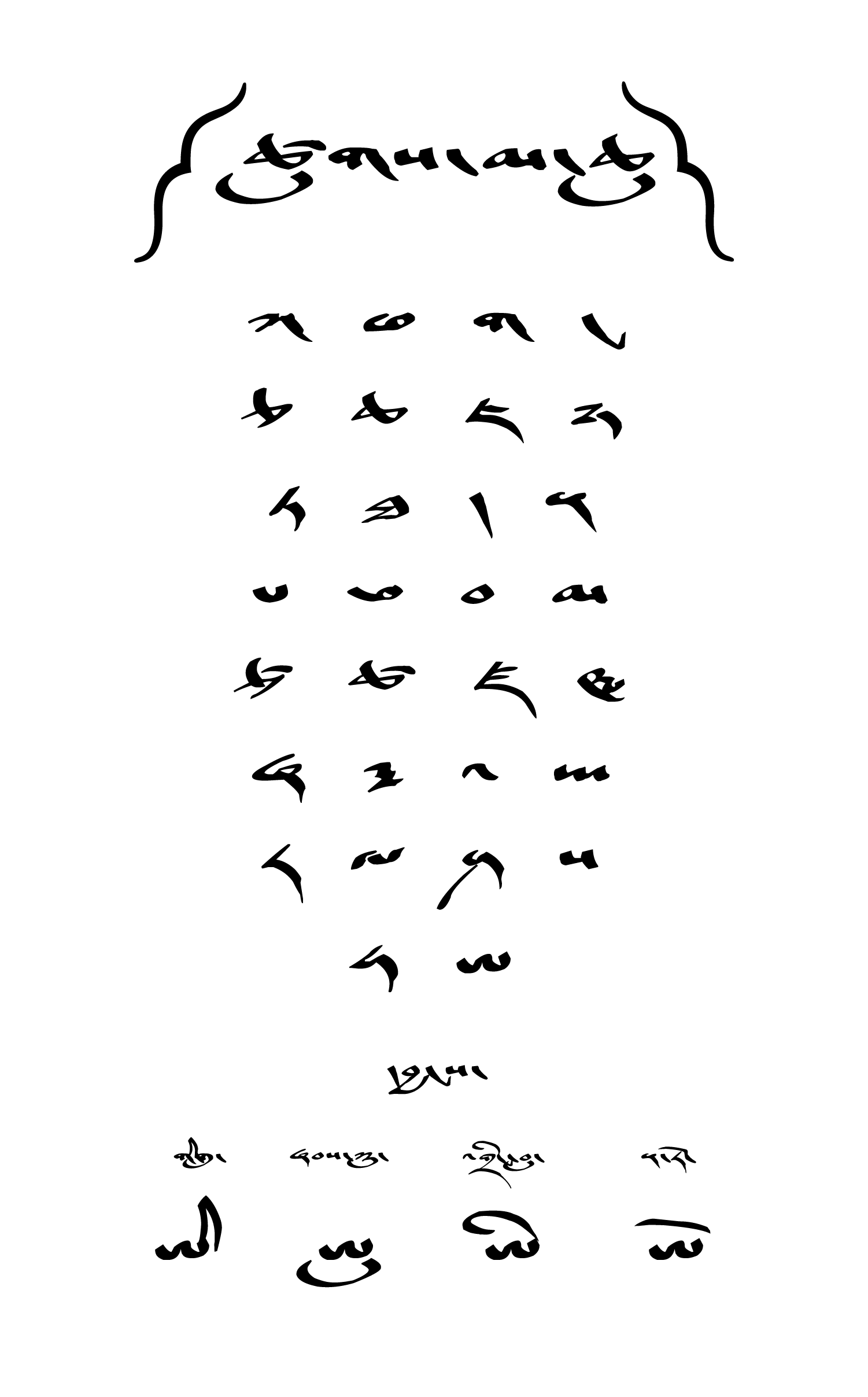
Tibetan Choksat (Alphabet) in Tsugma-chu cursive style

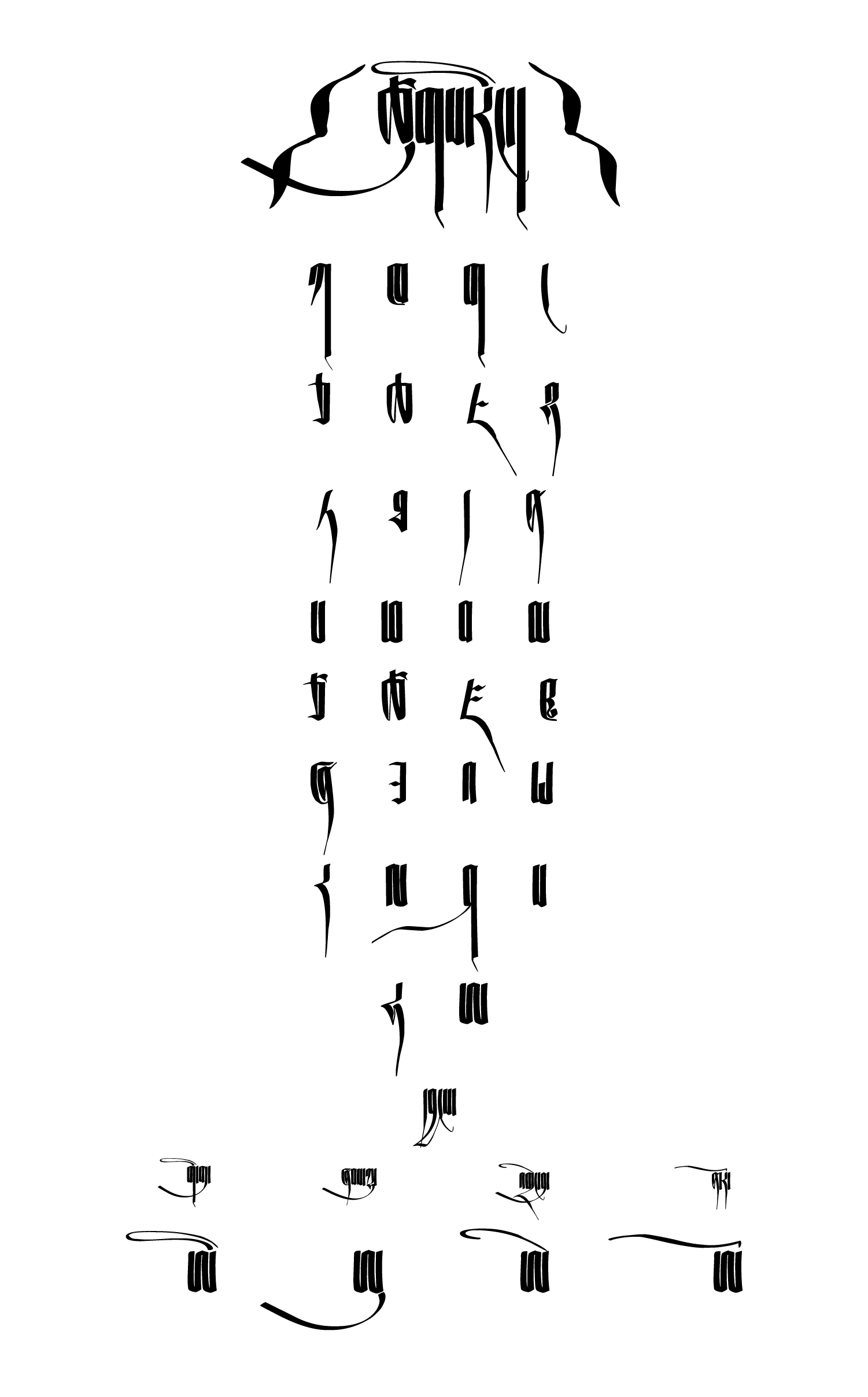
Tibetan Choksat (Alphabet) in Tsugring cursive style

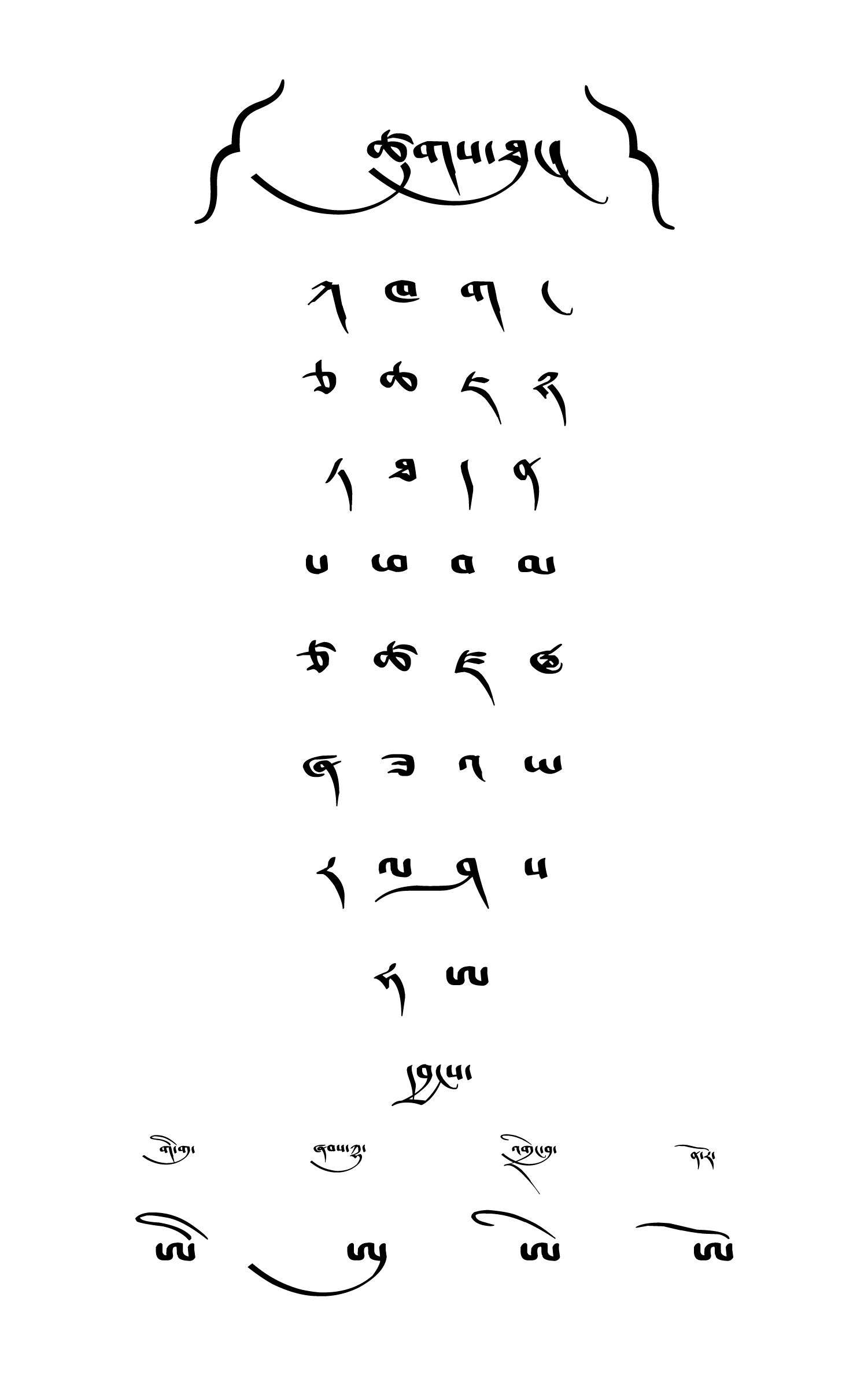
Tibetan Choksat (Alphabet) in Tsugtung cursive style

== See also ==
- Tibetan calligraphy
- Tibetan Braille
- Dzongkha Braille
- Tibetan typefaces
- Wylie transliteration
- Tibetan pinyin
- Roman Dzongkha
- THDL Simplified Phonetic Transcription
- Tise, input method for Tibetan script
- Limbu script
