= Bha (Indic) =

Letter "Bha" in Indic scripts

Example glyphs
- Bengali–Assamese: Bha
- Tibetan: བྷ
- Thai: ภ
- Malayalam: ഭ
- Sinhala: භ
- Ashoka Brahmi: Bha
- Devanagari: Bha

Cognates
- Hebrew: ב
- Greek: Β
- Latin: B
- Cyrillic: В, Б

Properties
- Phonemic representation: /bʰ/ /pʰ/^{B}
- IAST transliteration: bh Bh
- ISCII code point: CB (203)
- ^B in Tai languages, Mon and Khmer

Bha is a consonant of Indic abugidas. In modern Indic scripts, Bha is derived from the early "Ashoka" Brahmi letter after having gone through the Gupta letter. The letter is probably derived from the altered Aramaic Bet, and is thus related to the modern Latin B and Greek Beta.

== Āryabhaṭa numeration ==
Aryabhata used Devanagari letters for numbers, very similar to the Greek numerals, even after the invention of Indian numerals. The values of the different forms of भ are:

- भ [bʰə] = 24 (२४)
- भि [bʰɪ] = 2,400 (२ ४००)
- भु [bʰʊ] = 240,000 (२ ४० ०००)
- भृ [bʰri] = 24,000,000 (२ ४० ०० ०००)
- भॢ [bʰlə] = 24×10^{8} (२४×१०^{८})
- भे [bʰe] = 24×10^{10} (२४×१०^{१०})
- भै [bʰɛː] = 24×10^{12} (२४×१०^{१२})
- भो [bʰoː] = 24×10^{14} (२४×१०^{१४})
- भौ [bʰɔː] = 24×10^{16} (२४×१०^{१६})

== Historic Bha ==
There are three different general early historic scripts - Brahmi and its variants, Kharoṣṭhī, and Tocharian, the so-called slanting Brahmi. Bha as found in standard Brahmi, was a simple geometric shape, with variations toward more flowing forms by the Gupta. The Tocharian Bha did not have an alternate Fremdzeichen form. The third form of bha, in Kharoshthi was probably derived from Aramaic separately from the Brahmi letter.

=== Brahmi Bha ===
The Brahmi letter, Bha, is probably derived from the altered Aramaic Bet, and is thus related to the modern Latin B and Greek Beta. Several identifiable styles of writing the Brahmi Bha can be found, most associated with a specific set of inscriptions from an artifact or diverse records from an historic period. As the earliest and most geometric style of Brahmi, the letters found on the Edicts of Ashoka and other records from around that time are normally the reference form for Brahmi letters, with vowel marks not attested until later forms of Brahmi back-formed to match the geometric writing style.

Brahmi Bha historic forms
Ashoka (3rd-1st c. BCE)	Girnar (~150 BCE)	Kushana (~150-250 CE)	Gujarat (~250 CE)	Gupta (~350 CE)

=== Tocharian Bha ===
The Tocharian letter is derived from the Brahmi, but does not have an alternate Fremdzeichen form.

Tocharian Bha with vowel marks
Bha	Bhā	Bhi	Bhī	Bhu	Bhū	Bhr	Bhr̄	Bhe	Bhai	Bho	Bhau	Bhä

=== Kharoṣṭhī Bha ===
The Kharoṣṭhī letter is generally accepted as being derived from the altered Aramaic Bet, and is thus related to B and Beta, in addition to the Brahmi Bha.

== Devanagari Bha ==
Bha (भ) is a consonant of the Devanagari abugida. It ultimately arose from the Brahmi letter, after having gone through the Gupta letter. Letters that derive from it are the Gujarati letter ભ, and the Modi letter 𑘥.

=== Devanagari-using Languages ===
In all languages, भ is pronounced as [bʰə] or [bʰ] when appropriate. Like all Indic scripts, Devanagari uses vowel marks attached to the base consonant to override the inherent /ə/ vowel:

Devanagari भ with vowel marks
Bha	Bhā	Bhi	Bhī	Bhu	Bhū	Bhr	Bhr̄	Bhl	Bhl̄	Bhe	Bhai	Bho	Bhau	Bh
भ	भा	भि	भी	भु	भू	भृ	भॄ	भॢ	भॣ	भे	भै	भो	भौ	भ्

=== Conjuncts with भ ===
Half form of Bha.

Devanagari exhibits conjunct ligatures, as is common in Indic scripts. In modern Devanagari texts, most conjuncts are formed by reducing the letter shape to fit tightly to the following letter, usually by dropping a character's vertical stem, sometimes referred to as a "half form". Some conjunct clusters are always represented by a true ligature, instead of a shape that can be broken into constituent independent letters. Vertically stacked conjuncts are ubiquitous in older texts, while only a few are still used routinely in modern Devanagari texts. The use of ligatures and vertical conjuncts may vary across languages using the Devanagari script, with Marathi in particular preferring the use of half forms where texts in other languages would show ligatures and vertical stacks.

==== Ligature conjuncts of भ ====
True ligatures are quite rare in Indic scripts. The most common ligated conjuncts in Devanagari are in the form of a slight mutation to fit in context or as a consistent variant form appended to the adjacent characters. Those variants include Na and the Repha and Rakar forms of Ra. Nepali and Marathi texts use the "eyelash" Ra half form for an initial "R" instead of repha.

- Repha र্ (r) + भ (bʰa) gives the ligature rbʰa: ^{note}

- Eyelash र্ (r) + भ (bʰa) gives the ligature rbʰa:

- भ্ (bʰ) + न (na) gives the ligature bʰna:

- भ্ (bʰ) + rakar र (ra) gives the ligature bʰra:

- द্ (d) + भ (bʰa) gives the ligature dbʰa:

==== Stacked conjuncts of भ ====
Vertically stacked ligatures are the most common conjunct forms found in Devanagari text. Although the constituent characters may need to be stretched and moved slightly in order to stack neatly, stacked conjuncts can be broken down into recognizable base letters, or a letter and an otherwise standard ligature.

- भ্ (bʰ) + च (ca) gives the ligature bʰca:

- भ্ (bʰ) + ड (ḍa) gives the ligature bʰḍa:

- भ্ (bʰ) + ज (ja) gives the ligature bʰja:

- भ্ (bʰ) + ज্ (j) + ञ (ña) gives the ligature bʰjña:

- भ্ (bʰ) + ल (la) gives the ligature bʰla:

- भ্ (bʰ) + ङ (ŋa) gives the ligature bʰŋa:

- भ্ (bʰ) + ञ (ña) gives the ligature bʰña:

- छ্ (cʰ) + भ (bʰa) gives the ligature cʰbʰa:

- ड্ (ḍ) + भ (bʰa) gives the ligature ḍbʰa:

- ढ্ (ḍʱ) + भ (bʰa) gives the ligature ḍʱbʰa:

- ङ্ (ŋ) + भ (bʰa) gives the ligature ŋbʰa:

- ट্ (ṭ) + भ (bʰa) gives the ligature ṭbʰa:

- ठ্ (ṭʰ) + भ (bʰa) gives the ligature ṭʰbʰa:

== Bengali Bha ==
The Bengali script ভ is derived from the Siddhaṃ, and is marked by a similar horizontal head line, but less geometric shape, than its Devanagari counterpart, भ. The inherent vowel of Bengali consonant letters is /ɔ/, so the bare letter ভ will sometimes be transliterated as "bho" instead of "bha". Adding okar, the "o" vowel mark, gives a reading of /bʰo/. Like all Indic consonants, ভ can be modified by marks to indicate another (or no) vowel than its inherent "a".

Bengali ভ with vowel marks
bha	bhā	bhi	bhī	bhu	bhū	bhr	bhr̄	bhe	bhai	bho	bhau	bh
ভ	ভা	ভি	ভী	ভু	ভূ	ভৃ	ভৄ	ভে	ভৈ	ভো	ভৌ	ভ্

=== ভ in Bengali-using languages ===
ভ is used as a basic consonant character in all of the major Bengali script orthographies, including Bengali and Assamese.

=== Conjuncts with ভ ===
Bengali ভ exhibits conjunct ligatures, as is common in Indic scripts, with a tendency towards stacked ligatures.

- ভ্ (bʰ) + র (ra) gives the ligature bʰra, with the ra phala suffix:

- ভ্ (bʰ) + ব (va) gives the ligature bʰva, with the va phala suffix:

- ভ্ (bʰ) + য (ya) gives the ligature bʰya, with the ya phala suffix:

- দ্ (d) + ভ (bʰa) gives the ligature dbʰa:

- দ্ (d) + ভ্ (bʰ) + র (ra) gives the ligature dbʰra, with the ra phala suffix:

- ল্ (l) + ভ (bʰa) gives the ligature lbʰa:

- ম্ (m) + ভ (bʰa) gives the ligature mbʰa:

- ম্ (m) + ভ্ (bʰ) + র (ra) gives the ligature mbʰra, with the ra phala suffix:

- র্ (r) + ভ (bʰa) gives the ligature rbʰa, with the repha prefix:

== Gujarati Bha ==
Gujarati Bha.

Bha (ભ) is the twenty-fourth consonant of the Gujarati abugida. It is derived from the Devanagari Bha with the top bar (shiro rekha) removed, and ultimately the Brahmi letter.

=== Gujarati-using Languages ===
The Gujarati script is used to write the Gujarati and Kutchi languages. In both languages, ભ is pronounced as [bʰə] or [bʰ] when appropriate. Like all Indic scripts, Gujarati uses vowel marks attached to the base consonant to override the inherent /ə/ vowel:

Bha	Bhā	Bhi	Bhī	Bhu	Bhū	Bhr	Bhl	Bhr̄	Bhl̄	Bhĕ	Bhe	Bhai	Bhŏ	Bho	Bhau	Bh
Gujarati Bha syllables, with vowel marks in red.

=== Conjuncts with ભ ===
Half form of Bha.

Gujarati ભ exhibits conjunct ligatures, much like its parent Devanagari Script. Most Gujarati conjuncts can only be formed by reducing the letter shape to fit tightly to the following letter, usually by dropping a character's vertical stem, sometimes referred to as a "half form". A few conjunct clusters can be represented by a true ligature, instead of a shape that can be broken into constituent independent letters, and vertically stacked conjuncts can also be found in Gujarati, although much less commonly than in Devanagari. True ligatures are quite rare in Indic scripts. The most common ligated conjuncts in Gujarati are in the form of a slight mutation to fit in context or as a consistent variant form appended to the adjacent characters. Those variants include Na and the Repha and Rakar forms of Ra.

- ર્ (r) + ભ (bʰa) gives the ligature RBha:

- ભ્ (bʰ) + ર (ra) gives the ligature BhRa:

- ભ્ (bʰ) + ન (na) gives the ligature BhNa:

== Telugu Bha ==
Telugu independent and subjoined Bha.

Bha (భ) is a consonant of the Telugu abugida. It ultimately arose from the Brahmi letter. It is closely related to the Kannada letter ಭ. Most Telugu consonants contain a v-shaped headstroke that is related to the horizontal headline found in other Indic scripts, although headstrokes do not connect adjacent letters in Telugu. The headstroke is normally lost when adding vowel matras. Telugu conjuncts are created by reducing trailing letters to a subjoined form that appears below the initial consonant of the conjunct. Many subjoined forms are created by dropping their headline, with many extending the end of the stroke of the main letter body to form an extended tail reaching up to the right of the preceding consonant. This subjoining of trailing letters to create conjuncts is in contrast to the leading half forms of Devanagari and Bengali letters. Ligature conjuncts are not a feature in Telugu, with the only non-standard construction being an alternate subjoined form of Ṣa (borrowed from Kannada) in the KṢa conjunct.

== Malayalam Bha ==
Malayalam letter Bha

Bha (ഭ) is a consonant of the Malayalam abugida. It ultimately arose from the Brahmi letter, via the Grantha letter Bha. Like in other Indic scripts, Malayalam consonants have the inherent vowel "a", and take one of several modifying vowel signs to represent syllables with another vowel or no vowel at all.

Malayalam Bha matras: Bha, Bhā, Bhi, Bhī, Bhu, Bhū, Bhr̥, Bhr̥̄, Bhl̥, Bhl̥̄, Bhe, Bhē, Bhai, Bho, Bhō, Bhau, and Bh.

=== Conjuncts of ഭ ===
As is common in Indic scripts, Malayalam joins letters together to form conjunct consonant clusters. There are several ways in which conjuncts are formed in Malayalam texts: using a post-base form of a trailing consonant placed under the initial consonant of a conjunct, a combined ligature of two or more consonants joined together, a conjoining form that appears as a combining mark on the rest of the conjunct, the use of an explicit candrakkala mark to suppress the inherent "a" vowel, or a special consonant form called a "chillu" letter, representing a bare consonant without the inherent "a" vowel. Texts written with the modern reformed Malayalam orthography, put̪iya lipi, may favor more regular conjunct forms than older texts in paḻaya lipi, due to changes undertaken in the 1970s by the Government of Kerala.

- ത് (t) + ഭ (bʰa) gives the ligature tbʰa:

== Odia Bha ==
Odia independent and subjoined letter Bha.

Bha (ଭ) is a consonant of the Odia abugida. It ultimately arose from the Brahmi letter, via the Siddhaṃ letter Bha. Like in other Indic scripts, Odia consonants have the inherent vowel "a", and take one of several modifying vowel signs to represent syllables with another vowel or no vowel at all.

Odia Bha with vowel matras
Bha	Bhā	Bhi	Bhī	Bhu	Bhū	Bhr̥	Bhr̥̄	Bhl̥	Bhl̥̄	Bhe	Bhai	Bho	Bhau	Bh
ଭ	ଭା	ଭି	ଭୀ	ଭୁ	ଭୂ	ଭୃ	ଭୄ	ଭୢ	ଭୣ	ଭେ	ଭୈ	ଭୋ	ଭୌ	ଭ୍

=== Conjuncts of ଭ ===
As is common in Indic scripts, Odia joins letters together to form conjunct consonant clusters. The most common conjunct formation is achieved by using a small subjoined form of trailing consonants. Most consonants' subjoined forms are identical to the full form, just reduced in size, although a few drop the curved headline or have a subjoined form not directly related to the full form of the consonant. The second type of conjunct formation is through pure ligatures, where the constituent consonants are written together in a single graphic form. This ligature may be recognizable as being a combination of two characters or it can have a conjunct ligature unrelated to its constituent characters.

- ଦ୍ (d) + ଭ (bʰa) gives the ligature dbʰa:

- ମ୍ (m) + ଭ (bʰa) gives the ligature mbʰa:

== Tibetan ==
Tibetan letter Bha and its component characters Ba and Ha.

Bha is a consonant of the Tibetan abugida. Tibetan Bha is not genealogically related to Bha in other Indic scripts, but is rather a "compound" letter composed from Ba + Ha. It is not used for writing native Tibetan words, but can be found in terms borrowed from Sanskrit and other Indo-Aryan languages. It is, of course, used in writing Sanskrit.

== Kaithi Bha ==
Kaithi consonant and half-form Bha.

Bha (𑂦) is a consonant of the Kaithi abugida. It ultimately arose from the Brahmi letter, via the Siddhaṃ letter Bha. Like in other Indic scripts, Kaithi consonants have the inherent vowel "a", and take one of several modifying vowel signs to represent syllables with another vowel or no vowel at all.

Kaithi Bha with vowel matras
Bha	Bhā	Bhi	Bhī	Bhu	Bhū	Bhe	Bhai	Bho	Bhau	Bh
𑂦	𑂦𑂰	𑂦𑂱	𑂦𑂲	𑂦𑂳	𑂦𑂴	𑂦𑂵	𑂦𑂶	𑂦𑂷	𑂦𑂸	𑂦𑂹

=== Conjuncts of 𑂦 ===
As is common in Indic scripts, Kaithi joins letters together to form conjunct consonant clusters. The most common conjunct formation is achieved by using a half form of preceding consonants, although several consonants use an explicit virama. Most half forms are derived from the full form by removing the vertical stem. As is common in most Indic scripts, conjuncts of ra are indicated with a repha or rakar mark attached to the rest of the consonant cluster. In addition, there are a few vertical conjuncts that can be found in Kaithi writing, but true ligatures are not used in the modern Kaithi script.

- 𑂦୍ (bʰ) + 𑂩 (ra) gives the ligature a:

- 𑂩୍ (r) + 𑂦 (bʰa) gives the ligature a:

== Tirhuta Bha ==
Tirhuta consonant Bha

Bha (𑒦) is a consonant of the Tirhuta abugida. It ultimately arose from the Brahmi letter, via the Siddhaṃ letter Bha. Like in other Indic scripts, Tirhuta consonants have the inherent vowel "a", and take one of several modifying vowel signs to represent sylables with another vowel or no vowel at all.

Tirhuta Bha with vowel matras
Bha	Bhā	Bhi	Bhī	Bhu	Bhū	Bhṛ	Bhṝ	Bhḷ	Bhḹ	Bhē	Bhe	Bhai	Bhō	Bho	Bhau	Bh
𑒦	𑒦𑒰	𑒦𑒱	𑒦𑒲	𑒦𑒳	𑒦𑒴	𑒦𑒵	𑒦𑒶	𑒦𑒷	𑒦𑒸	𑒦𑒹	𑒦𑒺	𑒦𑒻	𑒦𑒼	𑒦𑒽	𑒦𑒾	𑒦𑓂

=== Conjuncts of 𑒦 ===
As is common in Indic scripts, Tirhuta joins letters together to form conjunct consonant clusters. The most common conjunct formation is achieved by using an explicit virama. As is common in most Indic scripts, conjuncts of ra are indicated with a repha or rakar mark attached to the rest of the consonant cluster. In addition, other consonants take unique combining forms when in conjunct with other letters, and there are several vertical conjuncts and true ligatures that can be found in Tirhuta writing.

- 𑒦 (bʰ) + 𑒇 (ṛ) gives the ligature bʰṛ:

- 𑒦୍ (bʰ) + 𑒩 (ra) gives the ligature bʰra:

- 𑒦 (bʰ) + 𑒅 (u) gives the ligature bʰu:

- 𑒦 (bʰ) + 𑒆 (ū) gives the ligature bʰū:

- 𑒦୍ (bʰ) + 𑒫 (va) gives the ligature bʰva:

- 𑒩୍ (r) + 𑒦 (bʰa) gives the ligature rbʰa:

- 𑒞୍ (t) + 𑒦 (bʰa) gives the ligature tbʰa:

== Comparison of Bha ==
The various Indic scripts are generally related to each other through adaptation and borrowing, and as such the glyphs for cognate letters, including Bha, are related as well.

Comparison of Bha in different scripts

Aramaic
Kharoṣṭhī 𐨧	Ashoka Brahmi	Kushana Brahmi (Note: The middle "Kushana" form of Brahmi is a later style that emerged as Brahmi scripts were beginning to proliferate. Gupta Brahmi was definitely a stylistic descendant from Kushana, but other Brahmi-derived scripts may have descended from earlier forms.)	Tocharian (Note: Tocharian is probably derived from the middle period "Kushana" form of Brahmi, although artifacts from that time are not plentiful enough to establish a definite succession.)
Gupta Brahmi	Pallava
Kadamba -
Bhaiksuki 𑰥	Siddhaṃ	Grantha 𑌭	Cham ꨞ
Sinhala භ	Pyu / Old Mon (Note: Pyu and Old Mon are probably the precursors of the Burmese script, and may be derived from either the Pallava or Kadamba script) -
Tibetan -	Newa 𑐨	Ahom 𑜘	Malayalam ഭ
Telugu భ	Burmese ဘ
Lepcha -	Ranjana	Saurashtra ꢩ	Dives Akuru 𑤣
Kannada ಭ	Kayah Li -
Limbu ᤓ	Soyombo (Note: May also be derived from Devangari (see bottom left of table)) 𑩳	Khmer ភ	Tamil -
Chakma 𑄞	Tai Tham ᨽ
Meitei Mayek ꯚ	Gaudi -	Thai ภ	Lao ຠ
Tai Le -
Marchen -	Tirhuta 𑒦	New Tai Lue ᦘ	Tai Viet -	Aksara Kawi
'Phags-pa -	Odia ଭ	Sharada 𑆨	Rejang -	Batak -	Buginese -
Zanabazar Square 𑨡	Bengali–Assamese	Takri 𑚡	Javanese ꦨ	Balinese ᬪ	Makasar -
Hangul (Note: The Origin of Hangul from 'Phags-pa is one of limited influence, inspiring at most a few basic letter shapes. Hangul does not function as an Indic abugida.) -	Northern Nagari -	Dogri 𑠡	Laṇḍā -	Sundanese ᮽ	Baybayin -
Modi 𑘥	Gujarati ભ	Khojki 𑈣	Khudabadi 𑋖	Mahajani 𑅫	Tagbanwa -
Devanagari	Nandinagari 𑧅	Kaithi	Gurmukhi ਭ	Multani 𑊟	Buhid -
Canadian Syllabics (Note: Although the basic letter forms of the Canadian Aboriginal Syllabics were derived from handwritten Devanagari letters, this abugida indicates vowel sounds by rotations of the letter form, rather than the use of vowel diacritics as is standard in Indic abugidas.) -	Soyombo (Note: May also be derived from Ranjana (see above)) 𑩳	Sylheti Nagari ꠜ	Gunjala Gondi 𑵯	Masaram Gondi (Note: Masaram Gondi acts as an Indic abugida, but its letterforms were not derived from any single precursor script.) 𑴣	Hanuno'o -

== Character encodings of Bha ==
Most Indic scripts are encoded in the Unicode Standard, and as such the letter Bha in those scripts can be represented in plain text with unique codepoint. Bha from several modern-use scripts can also be found in legacy encodings, such as ISCII.

Character information
Preview					భ		ଭ		ಭ		ഭ		ભ		ਭ	
Unicode name	DEVANAGARI LETTER BHA		BENGALI LETTER BHA		TELUGU LETTER BHA		ORIYA LETTER BHA		KANNADA LETTER BHA		MALAYALAM LETTER BHA		GUJARATI LETTER BHA		GURMUKHI LETTER BHA	
Encodings	decimal	hex	dec	hex	dec	hex	dec	hex	dec	hex	dec	hex	dec	hex	dec	hex
Unicode	2349	U+092D	2477	U+09AD	3117	U+0C2D	2861	U+0B2D	3245	U+0CAD	3373	U+0D2D	2733	U+0AAD	2605	U+0A2D
UTF-8	224 164 173	E0 A4 AD	224 166 173	E0 A6 AD	224 176 173	E0 B0 AD	224 172 173	E0 AC AD	224 178 173	E0 B2 AD	224 180 173	E0 B4 AD	224 170 173	E0 AA AD	224 168 173	E0 A8 AD
Numeric character reference	&#2349;	&#x92D;	&#2477;	&#x9AD;	&#3117;	&#xC2D;	&#2861;	&#xB2D;	&#3245;	&#xCAD;	&#3373;	&#xD2D;	&#2733;	&#xAAD;	&#2605;	&#xA2D;
ISCII	203	CB	203	CB	203	CB	203	CB	203	CB	203	CB	203	CB	203	CB

Character information
Preview	Ashoka Kushana Gupta		𐨧				𑌭	
Unicode name	BRAHMI LETTER BHA		KHAROSHTHI LETTER BHA		SIDDHAM LETTER BHA		GRANTHA LETTER BHA	
Encodings	decimal	hex	dec	hex	dec	hex	dec	hex
Unicode	69674	U+1102A	68135	U+10A27	71077	U+115A5	70445	U+1132D
UTF-8	240 145 128 170	F0 91 80 AA	240 144 168 167	F0 90 A8 A7	240 145 150 165	F0 91 96 A5	240 145 140 173	F0 91 8C AD
UTF-16	55300 56362	D804 DC2A	55298 56871	D802 DE27	55301 56741	D805 DDA5	55300 57133	D804 DF2D
Numeric character reference	&#69674;	&#x1102A;	&#68135;	&#x10A27;	&#71077;	&#x115A5;	&#70445;	&#x1132D;

Character information
Preview	བྷ		ྦྷ		𑨡		𑐨		𑰥		𑆨	
Unicode name	TIBETAN LETTER BHA		TIBETAN SUBJOINED LETTER BHA		ZANABAZAR SQUARE LETTER BHA		NEWA LETTER BHA		BHAIKSUKI LETTER BHA		SHARADA LETTER BHA	
Encodings	decimal	hex	dec	hex	dec	hex	dec	hex	dec	hex	dec	hex
Unicode	3927	U+0F57	4007	U+0FA7	72225	U+11A21	70696	U+11428	72741	U+11C25	70056	U+111A8
UTF-8	224 189 151	E0 BD 97	224 190 167	E0 BE A7	240 145 168 161	F0 91 A8 A1	240 145 144 168	F0 91 90 A8	240 145 176 165	F0 91 B0 A5	240 145 134 168	F0 91 86 A8
UTF-16	3927	0F57	4007	0FA7	55302 56865	D806 DE21	55301 56360	D805 DC28	55303 56357	D807 DC25	55300 56744	D804 DDA8
Numeric character reference	&#3927;	&#xF57;	&#4007;	&#xFA7;	&#72225;	&#x11A21;	&#70696;	&#x11428;	&#72741;	&#x11C25;	&#70056;	&#x111A8;

Character information
Preview	ဘ		ᨽ		ᦘ	
Unicode name	MYANMAR LETTER BHA		TAI THAM LETTER LOW PHA		NEW TAI LUE LETTER LOW PHA	
Encodings	decimal	hex	dec	hex	dec	hex
Unicode	4120	U+1018	6717	U+1A3D	6552	U+1998
UTF-8	225 128 152	E1 80 98	225 168 189	E1 A8 BD	225 166 152	E1 A6 98
Numeric character reference	&#4120;	&#x1018;	&#6717;	&#x1A3D;	&#6552;	&#x1998;

Character information
Preview	ភ		ຠ		ภ	
Unicode name	KHMER LETTER PHO		LAO LETTER PALI BHA		THAI CHARACTER PHO SAMPHAO	
Encodings	decimal	hex	dec	hex	dec	hex
Unicode	6039	U+1797	3744	U+0EA0	3616	U+0E20
UTF-8	225 158 151	E1 9E 97	224 186 160	E0 BA A0	224 184 160	E0 B8 A0
Numeric character reference	&#6039;	&#x1797;	&#3744;	&#xEA0;	&#3616;	&#xE20;

Character information
Preview	භ		𑄞		𑜘		𑤣		ꢩ		ꨞ	
Unicode name	SINHALA LETTER MAHAAPRAANA BAYANNA		CHAKMA LETTER BHAA		AHOM LETTER BHA		DIVES AKURU LETTER BHA		SAURASHTRA LETTER BHA		CHAM LETTER BHA	
Encodings	decimal	hex	dec	hex	dec	hex	dec	hex	dec	hex	dec	hex
Unicode	3511	U+0DB7	69918	U+1111E	71448	U+11718	71971	U+11923	43177	U+A8A9	43550	U+AA1E
UTF-8	224 182 183	E0 B6 B7	240 145 132 158	F0 91 84 9E	240 145 156 152	F0 91 9C 98	240 145 164 163	F0 91 A4 A3	234 162 169	EA A2 A9	234 168 158	EA A8 9E
UTF-16	3511	0DB7	55300 56606	D804 DD1E	55301 57112	D805 DF18	55302 56611	D806 DD23	43177	A8A9	43550	AA1E
Numeric character reference	&#3511;	&#xDB7;	&#69918;	&#x1111E;	&#71448;	&#x11718;	&#71971;	&#x11923;	&#43177;	&#xA8A9;	&#43550;	&#xAA1E;

Character information
Preview	𑘥		𑧅		𑩳		ꠜ		𑵯			
Unicode name	MODI LETTER BHA		NANDINAGARI LETTER BHA		SOYOMBO LETTER BHA		SYLOTI NAGRI LETTER BHO		GUNJALA GONDI LETTER BHA		KAITHI LETTER BHA	
Encodings	decimal	hex	dec	hex	dec	hex	dec	hex	dec	hex	dec	hex
Unicode	71205	U+11625	72133	U+119C5	72307	U+11A73	43036	U+A81C	73071	U+11D6F	69798	U+110A6
UTF-8	240 145 152 165	F0 91 98 A5	240 145 167 133	F0 91 A7 85	240 145 169 179	F0 91 A9 B3	234 160 156	EA A0 9C	240 145 181 175	F0 91 B5 AF	240 145 130 166	F0 91 82 A6
UTF-16	55301 56869	D805 DE25	55302 56773	D806 DDC5	55302 56947	D806 DE73	43036	A81C	55303 56687	D807 DD6F	55300 56486	D804 DCA6
Numeric character reference	&#71205;	&#x11625;	&#72133;	&#x119C5;	&#72307;	&#x11A73;	&#43036;	&#xA81C;	&#73071;	&#x11D6F;	&#69798;	&#x110A6;

Character information
Preview	𑒦		ᤓ		ꯚ	
Unicode name	TIRHUTA LETTER BHA		LIMBU LETTER BHA		MEETEI MAYEK LETTER BHAM	
Encodings	decimal	hex	dec	hex	dec	hex
Unicode	70822	U+114A6	6419	U+1913	43994	U+ABDA
UTF-8	240 145 146 166	F0 91 92 A6	225 164 147	E1 A4 93	234 175 154	EA AF 9A
UTF-16	55301 56486	D805 DCA6	6419	1913	43994	ABDA
Numeric character reference	&#70822;	&#x114A6;	&#6419;	&#x1913;	&#43994;	&#xABDA;

Character information
Preview	𑚡		𑠡		𑈣		𑋖		𑅫		𑊟	
Unicode name	TAKRI LETTER BHA		DOGRA LETTER BHA		KHOJKI LETTER BHA		KHUDAWADI LETTER BHA		MAHAJANI LETTER BHA		MULTANI LETTER BHA	
Encodings	decimal	hex	dec	hex	dec	hex	dec	hex	dec	hex	dec	hex
Unicode	71329	U+116A1	71713	U+11821	70179	U+11223	70358	U+112D6	69995	U+1116B	70303	U+1129F
UTF-8	240 145 154 161	F0 91 9A A1	240 145 160 161	F0 91 A0 A1	240 145 136 163	F0 91 88 A3	240 145 139 150	F0 91 8B 96	240 145 133 171	F0 91 85 AB	240 145 138 159	F0 91 8A 9F
UTF-16	55301 56993	D805 DEA1	55302 56353	D806 DC21	55300 56867	D804 DE23	55300 57046	D804 DED6	55300 56683	D804 DD6B	55300 56991	D804 DE9F
Numeric character reference	&#71329;	&#x116A1;	&#71713;	&#x11821;	&#70179;	&#x11223;	&#70358;	&#x112D6;	&#69995;	&#x1116B;	&#70303;	&#x1129F;

Character information
Preview	ᬪ		ꦨ	
Unicode name	BALINESE LETTER BA KEMBANG		JAVANESE LETTER BA MURDA	
Encodings	decimal	hex	dec	hex
Unicode	6954	U+1B2A	43432	U+A9A8
UTF-8	225 172 170	E1 AC AA	234 166 168	EA A6 A8
Numeric character reference	&#6954;	&#x1B2A;	&#43432;	&#xA9A8;

Character information
Preview	𑴣	
Unicode name	MASARAM GONDI LETTER BHA	
Encodings	decimal	hex
Unicode	72995	U+11D23
UTF-8	240 145 180 163	F0 91 B4 A3
UTF-16	55303 56611	D807 DD23
Numeric character reference	&#72995;	&#x11D23;
