= Ha (Indic) =

Letter "Ha" in Indic scripts

Example glyphs
- Bengali–Assamese: হ
- Tibetan: ཧ
- Tamil: ஹ
- Thai: ห
- Malayalam: ഹ
- Sinhala: හ
- Ashoka Brahmi: Ha
- Devanagari: ह

Cognates
- Hebrew: ה
- Greek: Ε
- Latin: E, Ɛ
- Cyrillic: E, Є, Э, Ҩ

Properties
- Phonemic representation: /h/
- IAST transliteration: h H
- ISCII code point: D8 (216)

Ha is a consonant of Indic abugidas. In modern Indic scripts, Ha is derived from the early "Ashoka" Brahmi letter after having gone through the Gupta letter.

== Āryabhaṭa numeration ==
Aryabhata used Devanagari letters for numbers, very similar to the Greek numerals, even after the invention of Indian numerals. The values of the different forms of ह are:

- ह [hə] = 100 (१००)
- हि [hi] = 10,000 (१० ०००)
- हु [hu] = 1,000,000 (१० ०० ०००)
- हृ [hr̩] = 100,000,000 (१० ०० ०० ०००)
- हॢ [hl̩] = ×10^{10} (१०^{१०})
- हे [heː] = ×10^{12} (×१०^{१२})
- है [həi̯] = ×10^{14} (×१०^{१४})
- हो [hoː] = ×10^{16} (×१०^{१६})
- हौ [həu̯] = ×10^{18} (×१०^{१८})

== Historic Ha ==
There are three different general early historic scripts - Brahmi and its variants, Kharoṣṭhī, and Tocharian, the so-called slanting Brahmi. Ha as found in standard Brahmi, was a simple geometric shape, with variations toward more flowing forms by the Gupta. The Tocharian Ha did not have an alternate Fremdzeichen form. The third form of ha, in Kharoshthi was probably derived from Aramaic separately from the Brahmi letter.

=== Brahmi Ha ===
The Brahmi letter, Ha, is probably derived from the Aramaic He, and is thus related to the modern Latin E and Greek Epsilon. Several identifiable styles of writing the Brahmi Ha can be found, most associated with a specific set of inscriptions from an artifact or diverse records from an historic period. As the earliest and most geometric style of Brahmi, the letters found on the Edicts of Ashoka and other records from around that time are normally the reference form for Brahmi letters, with vowel marks not attested until later forms of Brahmi back-formed to match the geometric writing style.

Brahmi Ha historic forms
Ashoka (3rd-1st c. BCE)	Girnar (~150 BCE)	Kushana (~150-250 CE)	Gujarat (~250 CE)	Gupta (~350 CE)

=== Tocharian Ha ===
The Tocharian letter is derived from the Brahmi, but does not have an alternate Fremdzeichen form.

Tocharian Ha with vowel marks
Ha	Hā	Hi	Hī	Hu	Hū	Hr	Hr̄	He	Hai	Ho	Hau	Hä

=== Kharoṣṭhī Ha ===
The Kharoṣṭhī letter is generally accepted as being derived from the Aramaic He, and is thus related to H and Eta, in addition to the Brahmi Ha.

== Devanagari Ha ==
Ha (ह) is a consonant of the Devanagari abugida. It ultimately arose from the Brahmi letter, after having gone through the Gupta letter. Letters that derive from it are the Gujarati letter હ, and the Modi letter 𑘮.

=== Devanagari-using Languages ===
In all languages, ह is pronounced as [ɦə] or [ɦ] when appropriate. Like all Indic scripts, Devanagari uses vowel marks attached to the base consonant to override the inherent /ə/ vowel:

Devanagari ह with vowel marks
Ha	Hā	Hi	Hī	Hu	Hū	Hr	Hr̄	Hl	Hl̄	He	Hai	Ho	Hau	H
ह	हा	हि	ही	हु	हू	हृ	हॄ	हॢ	हॣ	हे	है	हो	हौ	ह्

=== Conjuncts with ह ===
Devanagari exhibits conjunct ligatures, as is common in Indic scripts. In modern Devanagari texts, most conjuncts are formed by reducing the letter shape to fit tightly to the following letter, usually by dropping a character's vertical stem, sometimes referred to as a "half form". Some conjunct clusters are always represented by a true ligature, instead of a shape that can be broken into constituent independent letters. Vertically stacked conjuncts are ubiquitous in older texts, while only a few are still used routinely in modern Devanagari texts. Lacking a vertical stem to drop for making a half form, Ha either forms a stacked conjunct/ligature, or uses its full form with Virama. The use of ligatures and vertical conjuncts may vary across languages using the Devanagari script, with Marathi in particular avoiding their use where other languages would use them.

==== Ligature conjuncts of ह ====
True ligatures are quite rare in Indic scripts. The most common ligated conjuncts in Devanagari are in the form of a slight mutation to fit in context or as a consistent variant form appended to the adjacent characters. Those variants include Na and the Repha and Rakar forms of Ra. Nepali and Marathi texts use the "eyelash" Ra half form for an initial "R" instead of repha.

- Repha र্ (r) + ह (ha) gives the ligature rha: ^{note}

- Eyelash र্ (r) + ह (ha) gives the ligature rha:

- ह্ (h) + rakar र (ra) gives the ligature hra:

==== Stacked conjuncts of ह ====
Vertically stacked ligatures are the most common conjunct forms found in Devanagari text. Although the constituent characters may need to be stretched and moved slightly in order to stack neatly, stacked conjuncts can be broken down into recognizable base letters, or a letter and an otherwise standard ligature.

- छ্ (cʰ) + ह (ha) gives the ligature cʰha:

- ड্ (ḍ) + ह (ha) gives the ligature ḍha:

- ढ্ (ḍʱ) + ह (ha) gives the ligature ḍʱha:

- द্ (d) + ह (ha) gives the ligature dha:

- ह্ (h) + ब (ba) gives the ligature hba:

- ह্ (h) + च (ca) gives the ligature hca:

- ह্ (h) + ज (ja) gives the ligature hja:

- ह্ (h) + ज্ (j) + ञ (ña) gives the ligature hjña:

- ह্ (h) + क (ka) gives the ligature hka:

- ह্ (h) + ल (la) gives the ligature hla:

- ह্ (h) + ळ (ḷa) gives the ligature hḷa:

- ह্ (h) + म (ma) gives the ligature hma:

- ह্ (h) + न (na) gives the ligature hna:

- ह্ (h) + ण (ṇa) gives the ligature hṇa:

- ह্ (h) + ञ (ña) gives the ligature hña:

- ह্ (h) + व (va) gives the ligature hva:

- ह্ (h) + य (ya) gives the ligature hya:

- ङ্ (ŋ) + ह (ha) gives the ligature ŋha:

- ट্ (ṭ) + ह (ha) gives the ligature ṭha:

- ठ্ (ṭʰ) + ह (ha) gives the ligature ṭʰha:

== Bengali Ha ==
The Bengali script হ is derived from the Siddhaṃ, and is marked by a similar horizontal head line, but less geometric shape, than its Devanagari counterpart, ह. The inherent vowel of Bengali consonant letters is /ɔ/, so the bare letter হ will sometimes be transliterated as "ho" instead of "ha". Adding okar, the "o" vowel mark, gives a reading of /ho/. Like all Indic consonants, হ can be modified by marks to indicate another (or no) vowel than its inherent "a".

Bengali হ with vowel marks
ha	hā	hi	hī	hu	hū	hr	hr̄	he	hai	ho	hau	h
হ	হা	হি	হী	হু	হূ	হৃ	হৄ	হে	হৈ	হো	হৌ	হ্

=== হ in Bengali-using languages ===
হ is used as a basic consonant character in all of the major Bengali script orthographies, including Bengali and Assamese.

=== Conjuncts with হ ===
Bengali হ does not form conjuncts like most other letters, and can only be found in conjunction with Repha and Ya-phala.

- র্ (r) + হ (ha) gives the ligature rha, showing the repha prefix:

- র্ (r) + হ্ (h) + য (ya) gives the ligature rhya, with repha and the ya phala suffix:

== Gujarati Ha ==
Gujarati Ha.

Ha (હ) is the thirty-third consonant of the Gujarati abugida. It is derived from the Devanagari Ha ह with the top bar (shiro rekha) removed, and ultimately the Brahmi letter.

=== Gujarati-using Languages ===
The Gujarati script is used to write the Gujarati and Kutchi languages. In both languages, હ is pronounced as [hə] or [h] when appropriate. Like all Indic scripts, Gujarati uses vowel marks attached to the base consonant to override the inherent /ə/ vowel:

Ha	Hā	Hi	Hī	Hu	Hū	Hr	Hl	Hr̄	Hl̄	Hĕ	He	Hai	Hŏ	Ho	Hau	H
Gujarati Ha syllables, with vowel marks in red.

=== Conjuncts with હ ===
Gujarati હ exhibits conjunct ligatures, much like its parent Devanagari Script. While most Gujarati conjuncts can only be formed by reducing the letter shape to create a "half form" that fits tightly to following letter, Ha does not have a half form. A few conjunct clusters can be represented by a true ligature, instead of a shape that can be broken into constituent independent letters, and vertically stacked conjuncts can also be found in Gujarati, although much less commonly than in Devanagari. Lacking a half form, Ha will normally use an explicit virama when forming conjuncts without a true ligature. True ligatures are quite rare in Indic scripts. The most common ligated conjuncts in Gujarati are in the form of a slight mutation to fit in context or as a consistent variant form appended to the adjacent characters. Those variants include Na and the Repha and Rakar forms of Ra.

- ર્ (r) + હ (ha) gives the ligature RHa:

- હ્ (h) + ર (ra) gives the ligature HRa:

- હ્ (h) + ણ (ɳa) gives the ligature HṆa:

- હ્ (h) + ન (na) gives the ligature HNa:

- હ્ (h) + લ (la) gives the ligature HLa:

- હ્ (h) + વ (va) gives the ligature HVa:

== Telugu Ha ==
Telugu independent and subjoined Ha.

Ha (హ) is a consonant of the Telugu abugida. It ultimately arose from the Brahmi letter. It is closely related to the Kannada letter ಹ. Most Telugu consonants contain a v-shaped headstroke that is related to the horizontal headline found in other Indic scripts, although headstrokes do not connect adjacent letters in Telugu. The headstroke is normally lost when adding vowel matras. Telugu conjuncts are created by reducing trailing letters to a subjoined form that appears below the initial consonant of the conjunct. Many subjoined forms are created by dropping their headline, with many extending the end of the stroke of the main letter body to form an extended tail reaching up to the right of the preceding consonant. This subjoining of trailing letters to create conjuncts is in contrast to the leading half forms of Devanagari and Bengali letters. Ligature conjuncts are not a feature in Telugu, with the only non-standard construction being an alternate subjoined form of Ṣa (borrowed from Kannada) in the KṢa conjunct.

== Malayalam Ha ==
Malayalam letter Ha

Ha (ഹ) is a consonant of the Malayalam abugida. It ultimately arose from the Brahmi letter, via the Grantha letter Ha. Like in other Indic scripts, Malayalam consonants have the inherent vowel "a", and take one of several modifying vowel signs to represent syllables with another vowel or no vowel at all.

Malayalam Ha matras: Ha, Hā, Hi, Hī, Hu, Hū, Hr̥, Hr̥̄, Hl̥, Hl̥̄, He, Hē, Hai, Ho, Hō, Hau, and H.

=== Conjuncts of ഹ ===
As is common in Indic scripts, Malayalam joins letters together to form conjunct consonant clusters. There are several ways in which conjuncts are formed in Malayalam texts: using a post-base form of a trailing consonant placed under the initial consonant of a conjunct, a combined ligature of two or more consonants joined together, a conjoining form that appears as a combining mark on the rest of the conjunct, the use of an explicit candrakkala mark to suppress the inherent "a" vowel, or a special consonant form called a "chillu" letter, representing a bare consonant without the inherent "a" vowel. Texts written with the modern reformed Malayalam orthography, put̪iya lipi, may favor more regular conjunct forms than older texts in paḻaya lipi, due to changes undertaken in the 1970s by the Government of Kerala.

- ഹ് (h) + ന (na) gives the ligature hna:

- ഹ് (h) + മ (ma) gives the ligature hma:

== Odia Ha ==
Odia independent and subjoined letter Ha.

Ha (ହ) is a consonant of the Odia abugida. It ultimately arose from the Brahmi letter, via the Siddhaṃ letter Ha. Like in other Indic scripts, Odia consonants have the inherent vowel "a", and take one of several modifying vowel signs to represent syllables with another vowel or no vowel at all.

Odia Ha with vowel matras
Ha	Hā	Hi	Hī	Hu	Hū	Hr̥	Hr̥̄	Hl̥	Hl̥̄	He	Hai	Ho	Hau	H
ହ	ହା	ହି	ହୀ	ହୁ	ହୂ	ହୃ	ହୄ	ହୢ	ହୣ	ହେ	ହୈ	ହୋ	ହୌ	ହ୍

As is common in Indic scripts, Odia joins letters together to form conjunct consonant clusters. The most common conjunct formation is achieved by using a small subjoined form of trailing consonants. Most consonants' subjoined forms are identical to the full form, just reduced in size, although a few drop the curved headline or have a subjoined form not directly related to the full form of the consonant. The second type of conjunct formation is through pure ligatures, where the constituent consonants are written together in a single graphic form. ହ generates conjuncts only by subjoining and does not form ligatures.

== Kaithi Ha ==
Kaithi consonant Ha.

Ha (𑂯) is a consonant of the Kaithi abugida. It ultimately arose from the Brahmi letter, via the Siddhaṃ letter Ha. Like in other Indic scripts, Kaithi consonants have the inherent vowel "a", and take one of several modifying vowel signs to represent syllables with another vowel or no vowel at all.

Kaithi Ha with vowel matras
Ha	Hā	Hi	Hī	Hu	Hū	He	Hai	Ho	Hau	H
𑂯	𑂯𑂰	𑂯𑂱	𑂯𑂲	𑂯𑂳	𑂯𑂴	𑂯𑂵	𑂯𑂶	𑂯𑂷	𑂯𑂸	𑂯𑂹

=== Conjuncts of 𑂯 ===
As is common in Indic scripts, Kaithi joins letters together to form conjunct consonant clusters. The most common conjunct formation is achieved by using a half form of preceding consonants, although several consonants use an explicit virama. Most half forms are derived from the full form by removing the vertical stem. As is common in most Indic scripts, conjuncts of ra are indicated with a repha or rakar mark attached to the rest of the consonant cluster. In addition, there are a few vertical conjuncts that can be found in Kaithi writing, but true ligatures are not used in the modern Kaithi script.

- 𑂩୍ (r) + 𑂯 (ha) gives the ligature rha:

== Tirhuta Ha ==
Tirhuta consonant Ha

Ha (𑒯) is a consonant of the Tirhuta abugida. It ultimately arose from the Brahmi letter, via the Siddhaṃ letter Ha. Like in other Indic scripts, Tirhuta consonants have the inherent vowel "a", and take one of several modifying vowel signs to represent sylables with another vowel or no vowel at all.

Tirhuta Ha with vowel matras
Ha	Hā	Hi	Hī	Hu	Hū	Hṛ	Hṝ	Hḷ	Hḹ	Hē	He	Hai	Hō	Ho	Hau	H
𑒯	𑒯𑒰	𑒯𑒱	𑒯𑒲	𑒯𑒳	𑒯𑒴	𑒯𑒵	𑒯𑒶	𑒯𑒷	𑒯𑒸	𑒯𑒹	𑒯𑒺	𑒯𑒻	𑒯𑒼	𑒯𑒽	𑒯𑒾	𑒯𑓂

=== Conjuncts of 𑒯 ===
As is common in Indic scripts, Tirhuta joins letters together to form conjunct consonant clusters. The most common conjunct formation is achieved by using an explicit virama. As is common in most Indic scripts, conjuncts of ra are indicated with a repha or rakar mark attached to the rest of the consonant cluster. In addition, other consonants take unique combining forms when in conjunct with other letters, and there are several vertical conjuncts and true ligatures that can be found in Tirhuta writing.

- 𑒯୍ (h) + 𑒪 (la) gives the ligature hla:

- 𑒯୍ (h) + 𑒧 (ma) gives the ligature hma:

- 𑒯୍ (h) + 𑒢 (na) gives the ligature hna:

- 𑒯୍ (h) + 𑒝 (ṇa) gives the ligature hṇa:

- 𑒯 (h) + 𑒇 (ṛ) gives the ligature hṛ:

- 𑒯୍ (h) + 𑒩 (ra) gives the ligature hra:

- 𑒯 (h) + 𑒅 (u) gives the ligature hu:

- 𑒯 (h) + 𑒆 (ū) gives the ligature hū:

- 𑒯୍ (h) + 𑒫 (va) gives the ligature hva:

- 𑒯୍ (h) + 𑒨 (ya) gives the ligature hya:

- 𑒢୍ (n) + 𑒯 (ha) gives the ligature nha:

- 𑒩୍ (r) + 𑒯 (ha) gives the ligature rha:

- 𑒞୍ (t) + 𑒯 (ha) gives the ligature tha:

== Comparison of Ha ==
The various Indic scripts are generally related to each other through adaptation and borrowing, and as such the glyphs for cognate letters, including Ha, are related as well.

Comparison of Ha in different scripts

Aramaic
Kharoṣṭhī 𐨱	Ashoka Brahmi	Kushana Brahmi (Note: The middle "Kushana" form of Brahmi is a later style that emerged as Brahmi scripts were beginning to proliferate. Gupta Brahmi was definitely a stylistic descendant from Kushana, but other Brahmi-derived scripts may have descended from earlier forms.)	Tocharian (Note: Tocharian is probably derived from the middle period "Kushana" form of Brahmi, although artifacts from that time are not plentiful enough to establish a definite succession.)
Gupta Brahmi	Pallava
Kadamba -
Bhaiksuki 𑰮	Siddhaṃ	Grantha 𑌹	Cham ꨨ
Sinhala හ	Pyu / Old Mon (Note: Pyu and Old Mon are probably the precursors of the Burmese script, and may be derived from either the Pallava or Kadamba script) -
Tibetan	Newa 𑐴	Ahom 𑜑	Malayalam ഹ
Telugu హ	Burmese ဟ
Lepcha ᰝ	Ranjana	Saurashtra ꢲ	Dives Akuru 𑤭
Kannada ಹ	Kayah Li ꤟ
Limbu ᤜ	Soyombo (Note: May also be derived from Devangari (see bottom left of table)) 𑪂	Khmer ហ	Tamil ஹ
Chakma 𑄦	Tai Tham ᩉ / ᩌ
Meitei Mayek ꯍ	Gaudi -	Thai ห	Lao ຫ
Tai Le ᥞ
Marchen 𑲎	Tirhuta 𑒯	New Tai Lue ᦠ	Tai Viet ꪬ / ꪭ	Aksara Kawi
'Phags-pa ꡜ	Odia ହ	Sharada 𑆲	Rejang ꥁ	Batak ᯂ	Buginese ᨖ
Zanabazar Square 𑨱	Bengali–Assamese হ	Takri 𑚩	Javanese ꦲ	Balinese ᬳ	Makasar -
Hangul (Note: The Origin of Hangul from 'Phags-pa is one of limited influence, inspiring at most a few basic letter shapes. Hangul does not function as an Indic abugida.) -	Northern Nagari -	Dogri 𑠪	Laṇḍā -	Sundanese ᮠ	Baybayin ᜑ
Modi 𑘮	Gujarati હ	Khojki 𑈪	Khudabadi 𑋞	Mahajani 𑅱	Tagbanwa -
Devanagari ह	Nandinagari 𑧎	Kaithi	Gurmukhi ਹ	Multani 𑊦	Buhid ᝑ
Canadian Syllabics (Note: Although the basic letter forms of the Canadian Aboriginal Syllabics were derived from handwritten Devanagari letters, this abugida indicates vowel sounds by rotations of the letter form, rather than the use of vowel diacritics as is standard in Indic abugidas.) -	Soyombo (Note: May also be derived from Ranjana (see above)) 𑪂	Sylheti Nagari ꠢ	Gunjala Gondi 𑶇	Masaram Gondi (Note: Masaram Gondi acts as an Indic abugida, but its letterforms were not derived from any single precursor script.) 𑴬	Hanuno'o ᜱ

== Character encodings of Ha ==
Most Indic scripts are encoded in the Unicode Standard, and as such the letter Ha in those scripts can be represented in plain text with unique codepoint. Ha from several modern-use scripts can also be found in legacy encodings, such as ISCII.

Character information
Preview	ह		হ		ஹ		హ		ହ		ಹ		ഹ		હ		ਹ	
Unicode name	DEVANAGARI LETTER HA		BENGALI LETTER HA		TAMIL LETTER HA		TELUGU LETTER HA		ORIYA LETTER HA		KANNADA LETTER HA		MALAYALAM LETTER HA		GUJARATI LETTER HA		GURMUKHI LETTER HA	
Encodings	decimal	hex	dec	hex	dec	hex	dec	hex	dec	hex	dec	hex	dec	hex	dec	hex	dec	hex
Unicode	2361	U+0939	2489	U+09B9	3001	U+0BB9	3129	U+0C39	2873	U+0B39	3257	U+0CB9	3385	U+0D39	2745	U+0AB9	2617	U+0A39
UTF-8	224 164 185	E0 A4 B9	224 166 185	E0 A6 B9	224 174 185	E0 AE B9	224 176 185	E0 B0 B9	224 172 185	E0 AC B9	224 178 185	E0 B2 B9	224 180 185	E0 B4 B9	224 170 185	E0 AA B9	224 168 185	E0 A8 B9
Numeric character reference	&#2361;	&#x939;	&#2489;	&#x9B9;	&#3001;	&#xBB9;	&#3129;	&#xC39;	&#2873;	&#xB39;	&#3257;	&#xCB9;	&#3385;	&#xD39;	&#2745;	&#xAB9;	&#2617;	&#xA39;
ISCII	216	D8	216	D8	216	D8	216	D8	216	D8	216	D8	216	D8	216	D8	216	D8

Character information
Preview	Ashoka Kushana Gupta		𐨱				𑌹	
Unicode name	BRAHMI LETTER HA		KHAROSHTHI LETTER HA		SIDDHAM LETTER HA		GRANTHA LETTER HA	
Encodings	decimal	hex	dec	hex	dec	hex	dec	hex
Unicode	69683	U+11033	68145	U+10A31	71086	U+115AE	70457	U+11339
UTF-8	240 145 128 179	F0 91 80 B3	240 144 168 177	F0 90 A8 B1	240 145 150 174	F0 91 96 AE	240 145 140 185	F0 91 8C B9
UTF-16	55300 56371	D804 DC33	55298 56881	D802 DE31	55301 56750	D805 DDAE	55300 57145	D804 DF39
Numeric character reference	&#69683;	&#x11033;	&#68145;	&#x10A31;	&#71086;	&#x115AE;	&#70457;	&#x11339;

Character information
Preview	ཧ		ྷ		ꡜ		𑨱		𑐴		𑰮		𑆲	
Unicode name	TIBETAN LETTER HA		TIBETAN SUBJOINED LETTER HA		PHAGS-PA LETTER HA		ZANABAZAR SQUARE LETTER HA		NEWA LETTER HA		BHAIKSUKI LETTER HA		SHARADA LETTER HA	
Encodings	decimal	hex	dec	hex	dec	hex	dec	hex	dec	hex	dec	hex	dec	hex
Unicode	3943	U+0F67	4023	U+0FB7	43100	U+A85C	72241	U+11A31	70708	U+11434	72750	U+11C2E	70066	U+111B2
UTF-8	224 189 167	E0 BD A7	224 190 183	E0 BE B7	234 161 156	EA A1 9C	240 145 168 177	F0 91 A8 B1	240 145 144 180	F0 91 90 B4	240 145 176 174	F0 91 B0 AE	240 145 134 178	F0 91 86 B2
UTF-16	3943	0F67	4023	0FB7	43100	A85C	55302 56881	D806 DE31	55301 56372	D805 DC34	55303 56366	D807 DC2E	55300 56754	D804 DDB2
Numeric character reference	&#3943;	&#xF67;	&#4023;	&#xFB7;	&#43100;	&#xA85C;	&#72241;	&#x11A31;	&#70708;	&#x11434;	&#72750;	&#x11C2E;	&#70066;	&#x111B2;

Character information
Preview	ဟ		ᩉ		ᩌ		ᦠ	
Unicode name	MYANMAR LETTER HA		TAI THAM LETTER HIGH HA		TAI THAM LETTER LOW HA		NEW TAI LUE LETTER HIGH HA	
Encodings	decimal	hex	dec	hex	dec	hex	dec	hex
Unicode	4127	U+101F	6729	U+1A49	6732	U+1A4C	6560	U+19A0
UTF-8	225 128 159	E1 80 9F	225 169 137	E1 A9 89	225 169 140	E1 A9 8C	225 166 160	E1 A6 A0
Numeric character reference	&#4127;	&#x101F;	&#6729;	&#x1A49;	&#6732;	&#x1A4C;	&#6560;	&#x19A0;

Character information
Preview	ហ		ຫ		ห		ꪬ		ꪭ	
Unicode name	KHMER LETTER HA		LAO LETTER HO SUNG		THAI CHARACTER HO HIP		TAI VIET LETTER LOW HO		TAI VIET LETTER HIGH HO	
Encodings	decimal	hex	dec	hex	dec	hex	dec	hex	dec	hex
Unicode	6048	U+17A0	3755	U+0EAB	3627	U+0E2B	43692	U+AAAC	43693	U+AAAD
UTF-8	225 158 160	E1 9E A0	224 186 171	E0 BA AB	224 184 171	E0 B8 AB	234 170 172	EA AA AC	234 170 173	EA AA AD
Numeric character reference	&#6048;	&#x17A0;	&#3755;	&#xEAB;	&#3627;	&#xE2B;	&#43692;	&#xAAAC;	&#43693;	&#xAAAD;

Character information
Preview	හ		ꤟ		𑄦		ᥞ		𑜑		𑤭		ꢲ		ꨨ	
Unicode name	SINHALA LETTER HAYANNA		KAYAH LI LETTER HA		CHAKMA LETTER HAA		TAI LE LETTER HA		AHOM LETTER HA		DIVES AKURU LETTER HA		SAURASHTRA LETTER HA		CHAM LETTER HA	
Encodings	decimal	hex	dec	hex	dec	hex	dec	hex	dec	hex	dec	hex	dec	hex	dec	hex
Unicode	3524	U+0DC4	43295	U+A91F	69926	U+11126	6494	U+195E	71441	U+11711	71981	U+1192D	43186	U+A8B2	43560	U+AA28
UTF-8	224 183 132	E0 B7 84	234 164 159	EA A4 9F	240 145 132 166	F0 91 84 A6	225 165 158	E1 A5 9E	240 145 156 145	F0 91 9C 91	240 145 164 173	F0 91 A4 AD	234 162 178	EA A2 B2	234 168 168	EA A8 A8
UTF-16	3524	0DC4	43295	A91F	55300 56614	D804 DD26	6494	195E	55301 57105	D805 DF11	55302 56621	D806 DD2D	43186	A8B2	43560	AA28
Numeric character reference	&#3524;	&#xDC4;	&#43295;	&#xA91F;	&#69926;	&#x11126;	&#6494;	&#x195E;	&#71441;	&#x11711;	&#71981;	&#x1192D;	&#43186;	&#xA8B2;	&#43560;	&#xAA28;

Character information
Preview	𑘮		𑧎		𑪂		ꠢ		𑶇			
Unicode name	MODI LETTER HA		NANDINAGARI LETTER HA		SOYOMBO LETTER HA		SYLOTI NAGRI LETTER HO		GUNJALA GONDI LETTER HA		KAITHI LETTER HA	
Encodings	decimal	hex	dec	hex	dec	hex	dec	hex	dec	hex	dec	hex
Unicode	71214	U+1162E	72142	U+119CE	72322	U+11A82	43042	U+A822	73095	U+11D87	69807	U+110AF
UTF-8	240 145 152 174	F0 91 98 AE	240 145 167 142	F0 91 A7 8E	240 145 170 130	F0 91 AA 82	234 160 162	EA A0 A2	240 145 182 135	F0 91 B6 87	240 145 130 175	F0 91 82 AF
UTF-16	55301 56878	D805 DE2E	55302 56782	D806 DDCE	55302 56962	D806 DE82	43042	A822	55303 56711	D807 DD87	55300 56495	D804 DCAF
Numeric character reference	&#71214;	&#x1162E;	&#72142;	&#x119CE;	&#72322;	&#x11A82;	&#43042;	&#xA822;	&#73095;	&#x11D87;	&#69807;	&#x110AF;

Character information
Preview	𑒯		ᰝ		ᤜ		ꯍ		𑲎	
Unicode name	TIRHUTA LETTER HA		LEPCHA LETTER HA		LIMBU LETTER HA		MEETEI MAYEK LETTER HUK		MARCHEN LETTER HA	
Encodings	decimal	hex	dec	hex	dec	hex	dec	hex	dec	hex
Unicode	70831	U+114AF	7197	U+1C1D	6428	U+191C	43981	U+ABCD	72846	U+11C8E
UTF-8	240 145 146 175	F0 91 92 AF	225 176 157	E1 B0 9D	225 164 156	E1 A4 9C	234 175 141	EA AF 8D	240 145 178 142	F0 91 B2 8E
UTF-16	55301 56495	D805 DCAF	7197	1C1D	6428	191C	43981	ABCD	55303 56462	D807 DC8E
Numeric character reference	&#70831;	&#x114AF;	&#7197;	&#x1C1D;	&#6428;	&#x191C;	&#43981;	&#xABCD;	&#72846;	&#x11C8E;

Character information
Preview	𑚩		𑠪		𑈪		𑋞		𑅱		𑊦	
Unicode name	TAKRI LETTER HA		DOGRA LETTER HA		KHOJKI LETTER HA		KHUDAWADI LETTER HA		MAHAJANI LETTER HA		MULTANI LETTER HA	
Encodings	decimal	hex	dec	hex	dec	hex	dec	hex	dec	hex	dec	hex
Unicode	71337	U+116A9	71722	U+1182A	70186	U+1122A	70366	U+112DE	70001	U+11171	70310	U+112A6
UTF-8	240 145 154 169	F0 91 9A A9	240 145 160 170	F0 91 A0 AA	240 145 136 170	F0 91 88 AA	240 145 139 158	F0 91 8B 9E	240 145 133 177	F0 91 85 B1	240 145 138 166	F0 91 8A A6
UTF-16	55301 57001	D805 DEA9	55302 56362	D806 DC2A	55300 56874	D804 DE2A	55300 57054	D804 DEDE	55300 56689	D804 DD71	55300 56998	D804 DEA6
Numeric character reference	&#71337;	&#x116A9;	&#71722;	&#x1182A;	&#70186;	&#x1122A;	&#70366;	&#x112DE;	&#70001;	&#x11171;	&#70310;	&#x112A6;

Character information
Preview	ᬳ		ᯂ		ᨖ		ꦲ		ꥁ		ᮠ	
Unicode name	BALINESE LETTER HA		BATAK LETTER HA		BUGINESE LETTER HA		JAVANESE LETTER HA		REJANG LETTER HA		SUNDANESE LETTER HA	
Encodings	decimal	hex	dec	hex	dec	hex	dec	hex	dec	hex	dec	hex
Unicode	6963	U+1B33	7106	U+1BC2	6678	U+1A16	43442	U+A9B2	43329	U+A941	7072	U+1BA0
UTF-8	225 172 179	E1 AC B3	225 175 130	E1 AF 82	225 168 150	E1 A8 96	234 166 178	EA A6 B2	234 165 129	EA A5 81	225 174 160	E1 AE A0
Numeric character reference	&#6963;	&#x1B33;	&#7106;	&#x1BC2;	&#6678;	&#x1A16;	&#43442;	&#xA9B2;	&#43329;	&#xA941;	&#7072;	&#x1BA0;

Character information
Preview	ᜑ		ᝑ		ᜱ		𑴬	
Unicode name	TAGALOG LETTER HA		BUHID LETTER HA		HANUNOO LETTER HA		MASARAM GONDI LETTER HA	
Encodings	decimal	hex	dec	hex	dec	hex	dec	hex
Unicode	5905	U+1711	5969	U+1751	5937	U+1731	73004	U+11D2C
UTF-8	225 156 145	E1 9C 91	225 157 145	E1 9D 91	225 156 177	E1 9C B1	240 145 180 172	F0 91 B4 AC
UTF-16	5905	1711	5969	1751	5937	1731	55303 56620	D807 DD2C
Numeric character reference	&#5905;	&#x1711;	&#5969;	&#x1751;	&#5937;	&#x1731;	&#73004;	&#x11D2C;
