= Va (Indic) =

Letter "Va" in Indic scripts

Example glyphs
- Bengali–Assamese: Va
- Tibetan: ཝ
- Tamil: Va
- Thai: ว
- Malayalam: വ
- Sinhala: ව
- Ashoka Brahmi: Va
- Devanagari: Va

Cognates
- Hebrew: ו
- Greek: Ϝ (Ϛ), Υ (Ȣ)
- Latin: F, V, U, W, Y, Ⅎ
- Cyrillic: Ѕ, У (Ꙋ), Ѵ, Ю

Properties
- Phonemic representation: /ʋ/
- IAST transliteration: v V
- ISCII code point: D4 (212)

Va or Wa is a consonant of Indic abugidas. In modern Indic scripts, Va is derived from the early "Ashoka" Brahmi letter after having gone through the Gupta letter. It is generally romanized as "Va" in scripts for Indic languages, but as "Wa" in many scripts for other language families.

== Āryabhaṭa numeration ==
Aryabhata used Devanagari letters for numbers, very similar to the Greek numerals, even after the invention of Indian numerals. The values of the different forms of व are:

- व [ʋə] = 60 (६०)
- वि [ʋɪ] = 6,000 (६ ०००)
- वु [ʋʊ] = 600,000 (६ ०० ०००)
- वृ [ʋri] = 60,000,000 (६ ०० ०० ०००)
- वॢ [ʋlə] = 6×10^{9} (६×१०^{९})
- वे [ʋe] = 6×10^{11} (६×१०^{११})
- वै [ʋɛː] = 6×10^{13} (६×१०^{१३})
- वो [ʋoː] = 6×10^{15} (६×१०^{१५})
- वौ [ʋɔː] = 6×10^{17} (६×१०^{१७})

== Historic Va ==
There are three different general early historic scripts - Brahmi and its variants, Kharoṣṭhī, and Tocharian, the so-called slanting Brahmi. Va as found in standard Brahmi, was a simple geometric shape, with variations toward more flowing forms by the Gupta. The Tocharian Va had an alternate Fremdzeichen form,. The third form of va, in Kharoshthi was probably derived from Aramaic separately from the Brahmi letter.

=== Brahmi Va ===
The Brahmi letter, Va, is probably derived from the Aramaic Waw, and is thus related to the modern Latin F, V, U, W, Y, and Greek Upsilon. There are numerous distinguishable Brahmi Va writing styles, most of which are connected to a collection of inscriptions from an artifact or a variety of documents from a historical era. As the earliest and most geometric style of Brahmi, the letters found on the Edicts of Ashoka and other records from around that time are normally the reference form for Brahmi letters, with vowel marks not attested until later forms of Brahmi back-formed to match the geometric writing style.

Brahmi Va historic forms
Ashoka (3rd-1st c. BCE)	Girnar (~150 BCE)	Kushana (~150-250 CE)	Gujarat (~250 CE)	Gupta (~350 CE)

=== Tocharian Va ===
The Tocharian letter is derived from the Brahmi, and has an alternate Fremdzeichen form used in conjuncts and as an alternate representation of Vä.

Tocharian Va with vowel marks
Va	Vā	Vi	Vī	Vu	Vū	Vr	Vr̄	Ve	Vai	Vo	Vau	Vä	Fremdzeichen

=== Kharoṣṭhī Va ===
The Kharoṣṭhī letter is generally accepted as being derived from the Aramaic Waw, and is thus related to F, V, U, W, Y, and Upsilon, in addition to the Brahmi Va.

== Devanagari Va ==
Va (व) is a consonant of the Devanagari abugida. It ultimately arose from the Brahmi letter, after having gone through the Gupta letter. Letters that derive from it are the Gujarati letter વ, and the Modi letter 𑘪.

=== Old Nepali Va ===
In old Nepali language texts, a specific nuqta like dot is added to this glyph in order to represent the [wʌ], while the glyph by itself would be used to represent the bilabial stop [b].

Half form of Va.

=== Devanagari-using Languages ===
In most languages, व is pronounced as [və] or [v] when appropriate, while in Nepali it is [wʌ], however combination of [w] and /e, i, o, ʌi̯, r, w, j/ is constrained in Nepali, thus the letter is always pronounced as a bilabial stop [b] in such cases, but only sometimes otherwise. Like all Indic scripts, Devanagari uses vowel marks attached to the base consonant to override the inherent /ə/ vowel:

Devanagari व with vowel marks
Va	Vā	Vi	Vī	Vu	Vū	Vr	Vr̄	Vl	Vl̄	Ve	Vai	Vo	Vau	V
व	वा	वि	वी	वु	वू	वृ	वॄ	वॢ	वॣ	वे	वै	वो	वौ	व्

=== Conjuncts with व ===
Half form of Va.

Devanagari exhibits conjunct ligatures, as is common in Indic scripts. In modern Devanagari texts, most conjuncts are formed by reducing the letter shape to fit tightly to the following letter, usually by dropping a character's vertical stem, sometimes referred to as a "half form". Some conjunct clusters are always represented by a true ligature, instead of a shape that can be broken into constituent independent letters. Vertically stacked conjuncts are ubiquitous in older texts, while only a few are still used routinely in modern Devanagari texts. The use of ligatures and vertical conjuncts may vary across languages using the Devanagari script, with Marathi in particular preferring the use of half forms where texts in other languages would show ligatures and vertical stacks.

==== Ligature conjuncts of व ====
True ligatures are quite rare in Indic scripts. The most common ligated conjuncts in Devanagari are in the form of a slight mutation to fit in context or as a consistent variant form appended to the adjacent characters. Those variants include Na and the Repha and Rakar forms of Ra. Nepali and Marathi texts use the "eyelash" Ra half form for an initial "R" instead of repha.

- Repha र্ (r) + व (va) gives the ligature rva: ^{note}

- Eyelash र্ (r) + व (va) gives the ligature rva:

- व্ (v) + न (na) gives the ligature vna:

- व্ (v) + rakar र (ra) gives the ligature vra:

- द্ (d) + ध্ (dʱ) + व (va) gives the ligature ddʱva:

- द্ (d) + व (va) gives the ligature dva:

- द্ (d) + व্ (v) + य (ya) gives the ligature dvya:

- Repha र্ (r) + द্ (d) + व (va) gives the ligature rdva:

==== Stacked conjuncts of व ====
Vertically stacked ligatures are the most common conjunct forms found in Devanagari text. Although the constituent characters may need to be stretched and moved slightly in order to stack neatly, stacked conjuncts can be broken down into recognizable base letters, or a letter and an otherwise standard ligature.

- ब্ (b) + व (va) gives the ligature bva:

- छ্ (cʰ) + व (va) gives the ligature cʰva:

- च্ (c) + व (va) gives the ligature cva:

- ढ্ (ḍʱ) + व (va) gives the ligature ḍʱva:

- ड্ (ḍ) + व (va) gives the ligature ḍva:

- ह্ (h) + व (va) gives the ligature hva:

- झ্ (jʰ) + व (va) gives the ligature jʰva:

- ज্ (j) + ज্ (j) + व (va) gives the ligature jjva:

- ख্ (kʰ) + व (va) gives the ligature kʰva:

- क্ (k) + त্ (t) + व (va) gives the ligature ktva:

- क্ (k) + व (va) gives the ligature kva:

- ळ্ (ḷ) + व (va) gives the ligature ḷva:

- ल্ (l) + व (va) gives the ligature lva:

- ङ্ (ŋ) + व (va) gives the ligature ŋva:

- ञ্ (ñ) + व (va) gives the ligature ñva:

- फ্ (pʰ) + व (va) gives the ligature pʰva:

- Repha र্ (r) + स্ (s) + व (va) gives the ligature rsva:

- श্ (ʃ) + व (va) gives the ligature ʃva:

- ष্ (ṣ) + ट্ (ṭ) + व (va) gives the ligature ṣṭva:

- स্ (s) + व (va) gives the ligature sva:

- ठ্ (ṭʰ) + व (va) gives the ligature ṭʰva:

- ट্ (ṭ) + व (va) gives the ligature ṭva:

- त্ (t) + त্ (t) + व (va) gives the ligature ttva:

- त্ (t) + व (va) gives the ligature tva:

- व্ (v) + ब (ba) gives the ligature vba:

- व্ (v) + च (ca) gives the ligature vca:

- व্ (v) + छ (cʰa) gives the ligature vcʰa:

- व্ (v) + ड (ḍa) gives the ligature vḍa:

- व্ (v) + ग (ga) gives the ligature vga:

- व্ (v) + ज (ja) gives the ligature vja:

- व্ (v) + ज্ (j) + ञ (ña) gives the ligature vjña:

- व্ (v) + क (ka) gives the ligature vka:

- व্ (v) + ल (la) gives the ligature vla:

- व্ (v) + ङ (ŋa) gives the ligature vŋa:

- व্ (v) + ञ (ña) gives the ligature vña:

- व্ (v) + व (va) gives the ligature vva:

== Bengali Va ==
The Bengali script ব is derived from the Siddhaṃ, and is marked by a similar horizontal head line, but less geometric shape, than its Devanagari counterpart, व. Unlike many of its cognates in other Indic scripts, ব is primarily identified as the /b/ consonant, especially as an independent consonant. It tends to have no inherent pronunciation itself when in a non-head position of a conjunct conjunct, often serving as an indication of gemination (doubling) of the preceding consonant sound, although there are a few words where it retains its /b/ pronunciation. Like all Indic consonants, ব can be modified by marks to indicate another (or no) vowel than its inherent "a".

Bengali ব with vowel marks
ba	bā	bi	bī	bu	bū	br	br̄	be	bai	bo	bau	b
ব	বা	বি	বী	বু	বূ	বৃ	বৄ	বে	বৈ	বো	বৌ	ব্

=== ব in Bengali-using languages ===
ব is used as a basic consonant character in all of the major Bengali script orthographies, including Bengali and Assamese.

=== Conjuncts with non-head ব ===
Bengali ব exhibits conjunct ligatures, as is common in Indic scripts, with a tendency towards stacked ligatures. When used as the head (first) consonant in a conjunct, ব is normally pronounced as /b/.

==== Bengali Va-phala ====
Bengali Va-phala

Like Ra and Ya, the Bengali Va is almost always realized in a reduced form called "Va phala" (vo pholo) when found as the final consonant of a conjunct. This reduced form is appended at the bottom of a vertical stem, or otherwise attached at the bottom of a preceding consonant or conjunct.

- ভ্ (bʰ) + ব (va) gives the ligature bʰva:

- চ্ (c) + ছ্ (cʰ) + ব (va) gives the ligature ccʰva:

- চ্ (c) + ব (va) gives the ligature cva:

- ড্ (ḍ) + ব (va) gives the ligature ḍva:

- দ্ (d) + দ্ (d) + ব (va) gives the ligature ddva:

- দ্ (d) + ব (va) gives the ligature dva:

- গ্ (g) + ব (va) gives the ligature gva:

- জ্ (j) + জ্ (j) + ব (va) gives the ligature jjva:

- জ্ (j) + ব (va) gives the ligature jva:

- খ্ (kʰ) + ব (va) gives the ligature kʰva:

- ক্ (k) + ষ্ (ṣ) + ব (va) gives the ligature kṣva:

- ক্ (k) + ব (va) gives the ligature kva:

- ল্ (l) + ব (va) gives the ligature lva:

- ম্ (m) + ব (va) gives the ligature mva:

- ন্ (n) + দ্ (d) + ব (va) gives the ligature ndva:

- ন্ (n) + ত্ (t) + ব (va) gives the ligature ntva:

- ন্ (n) + ব (va) gives the ligature nva:

- র্ (r) + দ্ (d) + ব (va) gives the ligature rdva, with repha in addition to va phala:

- র্ (r) + শ্ (ʃ) + ব (va) gives the ligature rʃva, with repha in addition to va phala:

- শ্ (ʃ) + ব (va) gives the ligature ʃva:

- ষ্ (ṣ) + ব (va) gives the ligature ṣva:

- স্ (s) + ত্ (t) + ব (va) gives the ligature stva:

- স্ (s) + ব (va) gives the ligature sva:

- থ্ (tʰ) + ব (va) gives the ligature tʰva:

- ট্ (ṭ) + ব (va) gives the ligature ṭva:

- ত্ (t) + ত্ (t) + ব (va) gives the ligature ttva:

- ত্ (t) + ব (va) gives the ligature tva:

==== Other ব conjuncts ====
A few letters conjoin with ব by keeping it in its full form instead of the reduced Va-phala.

- ধ্ (dʱ) + ব (va) gives the ligature dʱva with full-form va:

- র্ (r) + ধ্ (dʱ) + ব (va) gives the ligature rdʱva, with repha:

- ম্ (m) + ব্ (v) + র (ra) gives the ligature mvra, with the ra phala suffix. Note that this is a different base conjunct than mva, above:

== Gujarati Va ==
Gujarati Va.

Va (વ) is the twenty-ninth consonant of the Gujarati abugida. It is derived from the Devanagari Va with the top bar (shiro rekha) removed, and ultimately the Brahmi letter.

=== Gujarati-using Languages ===
The Gujarati script is used to write the Gujarati and Kutchi languages. In both languages, વ is pronounced as [və] or [v] when appropriate. Like all Indic scripts, Gujarati uses vowel marks attached to the base consonant to override the inherent /ə/ vowel:

Va	Vā	Vi	Vī	Vu	Vū	Vr	Vl	Vr̄	Vl̄	Vĕ	Ve	Vai	Vŏ	Vo	Vau	V
Gujarati Va syllables, with vowel marks in red.

=== Conjuncts with વ ===
Half form of Va.

Gujarati વ exhibits conjunct ligatures, much like its parent Devanagari Script. Most Gujarati conjuncts can only be formed by reducing the letter shape to fit tightly to the following letter, usually by dropping a character's vertical stem, sometimes referred to as a "half form". A few conjunct clusters can be represented by a true ligature, instead of a shape that can be broken into constituent independent letters, and vertically stacked conjuncts can also be found in Gujarati, although much less commonly than in Devanagari. True ligatures are quite rare in Indic scripts. The most common ligated conjuncts in Gujarati are in the form of a slight mutation to fit in context or as a consistent variant form appended to the adjacent characters. Those variants include Na and the Repha and Rakar forms of Ra.

- ર્ (r) + વ (va) gives the ligature RVa:

- વ્ (v) + ર (ra) gives the ligature VRa:

- ટ્ (ʈ) + વ (va) gives the ligature ṬVa:

- ડ્ (ɖ) + વ (va) gives the ligature ḌVa:

- દ્ (d) + વ (va) gives the ligature DVa:

- વ્ (v) + ન (na) gives the ligature VNa:

- શ્ (ʃ) + વ (va) gives the ligature ŚVa:

- હ્ (h) + વ (va) gives the ligature HVa:

== Telugu Va ==
Telugu independent and subjoined Va.

Va (వ) is a consonant of the Telugu abugida. It ultimately arose from the Brahmi letter. It is closely related to the Kannada letter ವ. Most Telugu consonants contain a v-shaped headstroke that is related to the horizontal headline found in other Indic scripts, although headstrokes do not connect adjacent letters in Telugu. The headstroke is normally lost when adding vowel matras. Telugu conjuncts are created by reducing trailing letters to a subjoined form that appears below the initial consonant of the conjunct. Many subjoined forms are created by dropping their headline, with many extending the end of the stroke of the main letter body to form an extended tail reaching up to the right of the preceding consonant. This subjoining of trailing letters to create conjuncts is in contrast to the leading half forms of Devanagari and Bengali letters. Ligature conjuncts are not a feature in Telugu, with the only non-standard construction being an alternate subjoined form of Ṣa (borrowed from Kannada) in the KṢa conjunct.

== Malayalam Va ==
Malayalam letter Va

Va (വ) is a consonant of the Malayalam abugida. It ultimately arose from the Brahmi letter, via the Grantha letter Va. Like in other Indic scripts, Malayalam consonants have the inherent vowel "a", and take one of several modifying vowel signs to represent syllables with another vowel or no vowel at all.

Malayalam Va matras: Va, Vā, Vi, Vī, Vu, Vū, Vr̥, Vr̥̄, Vl̥, Vl̥̄, Ve, Vē, Vai, Vo, Vō, Vau, and V.

=== Conjuncts of വ ===
As is common in Indic scripts, Malayalam joins letters together to form conjunct consonant clusters. There are several ways in which conjuncts are formed in Malayalam texts: using a post-base form of a trailing consonant placed under the initial consonant of a conjunct, a combined ligature of two or more consonants joined, a conjoining form that appears as a combining mark on the rest of the conjunct, the use of an explicit candrakkala mark to suppress the inherent "a" vowel, or a special consonant form called a "chillu" letter, representing a bare consonant without the inherent "a" vowel. Texts written with the modern reformed Malayalam orthography, put̪iya lipi, may favor more regular conjunct forms than older texts in paḻaya lipi, due to changes undertaken in the 1970s by the Government of Kerala.

- വ് (v) + വ (va) gives the ligature vva:

== Odia Wa ==
Odia independent and subjoined letter Wa.

Wa (ୱ) is a consonant of the Odia abugida. It ultimately arose from the Brahmi letter, via the Siddhaṃ letter Va. Like in other Indic scripts, Odia consonants have the inherent vowel "a", and take one of several modifying vowel signs to represent syllables with another vowel or no vowel at all.

Odia Wa with vowel matras
Wa	Wā	Wi	Wī	Wu	Wū	Wr̥	Wr̥̄	Wl̥	Wl̥̄	We	Wai	Wo	Wau	W
ୱ	ୱା	ୱି	ୱୀ	ୱୁ	ୱୂ	ୱୃ	ୱୄ	ୱୢ	ୱୣ	ୱେ	ୱୈ	ୱୋ	ୱୌ	ୱ୍

As is common in Indic scripts, Odia joins letters together to form conjunct consonant clusters. The most common conjunct formation is achieved by using a small subjoined form of trailing consonants. Most consonants' subjoined forms are identical to the full form, just reduced in size, although a few drop the curved headline or have a subjoined form not directly related to the full form of the consonant. Wa shares its subjoined form with Ba, called "Ba Phala" or "Wa Phala" depending on its pronunciation in context. Ba is the character normally used for the /w/ and /v/ sounds of the letter Wa. ୱ generates conjuncts only by subjoining and does not form ligatures.

== Kaithi Va ==
Kaithi consonant and half-form Va.

Va (𑂫) is a consonant of the Kaithi abugida. It ultimately arose from the Brahmi letter, via the Siddhaṃ letter Va. Like in other Indic scripts, Kaithi consonants have the inherent vowel "a", and take one of several modifying vowel signs to represent syllables with another vowel or no vowel at all.

Kaithi Va with vowel matras
Va	Vā	Vi	Vī	Vu	Vū	Ve	Vai	Vo	Vau	V
𑂫	𑂫𑂰	𑂫𑂱	𑂫𑂲	𑂫𑂳	𑂫𑂴	𑂫𑂵	𑂫𑂶	𑂫𑂷	𑂫𑂸	𑂫𑂹

=== Conjuncts of 𑂫 ===
As is common in Indic scripts, Kaithi joins letters together to form conjunct consonant clusters. The most common conjunct formation is achieved by using a half form of preceding consonants, although several consonants use an explicit virama. Most half forms are derived from the full form by removing the vertical stem. As is common in most Indic scripts, conjuncts of ra are indicated with a repha or rakar mark attached to the rest of the consonant cluster. In addition, there are a few vertical conjuncts that can be found in Kaithi writing, but true ligatures are not used in the modern Kaithi script.

- 𑂫୍ (v) + 𑂩 (ra) gives the ligature vra:

== Tirhuta Va ==
Tirhuta consonant Va

Va (𑒫) is a consonant of the Tirhuta abugida. It ultimately arose from the Brahmi letter, via the Siddhaṃ letter Va. Like in other Indic scripts, Tirhuta consonants have the inherent vowel "a", and take one of several modifying vowel signs to represent sylables with another vowel or no vowel at all.

Tirhuta Va with vowel matras
Va	Vā	Vi	Vī	Vu	Vū	ṛ	ṝ	ḷ	ḹ	Vē	Ve	Vai	Vō	Vo	Vau	V
𑒫	𑒫𑒰	𑒫𑒱	𑒫𑒲	𑒫𑒳	𑒫𑒴	𑒫𑒵	𑒫𑒶	𑒫𑒷	𑒫𑒸	𑒫𑒹	𑒫𑒺	𑒫𑒻	𑒫𑒼	𑒫𑒽	𑒫𑒾	𑒫𑓂

=== Conjuncts of 𑒫 ===
As is common in Indic scripts, Tirhuta joins letters together to form conjunct consonant clusters. The most common conjunct formation is achieved by using an explicit virama. As is common in most Indic scripts, conjuncts of ra are indicated with a repha or rakar mark attached to the rest of the consonant cluster. In addition, other consonants take unique combining forms when in conjunct with other letters, and there are several vertical conjuncts and true ligatures that can be found in Tirhuta writing.

- 𑒦୍ (bʰ) + 𑒫 (va) gives the ligature bʰva:

- 𑒥୍ (b) + 𑒫 (va) gives the ligature bva:

- 𑒕୍ (cʰ) + 𑒫 (va) gives the ligature cʰva:

- 𑒔୍ (c) + 𑒫 (va) gives the ligature cva:

- 𑒜୍ (ḍʱ) + 𑒫 (va) gives the ligature ḍʱva:

- 𑒛୍ (ḍ) + 𑒫 (va) gives the ligature ḍva:

- 𑒡୍ (dʱ) + 𑒫 (va) gives the ligature dʱva:

- 𑒠୍ (d) + 𑒫 (va) gives the ligature dva:

- 𑒒୍ (ɡʱ) + 𑒫 (va) gives the ligature ɡʱva:

- 𑒑୍ (g) + 𑒫 (va) gives the ligature gva:

- 𑒯୍ (h) + 𑒫 (va) gives the ligature hva:

- 𑒗୍ (jʰ) + 𑒫 (va) gives the ligature jʰva:

- 𑒖୍ (j) + 𑒫 (va) gives the ligature jva:

- 𑒐୍ (kʰ) + 𑒫 (va) gives the ligature kʰva:

- 𑒏୍ (k) + 𑒫 (va) gives the ligature kva:

- 𑒪୍ (l) + 𑒫 (va) gives the ligature lva:

- 𑒧୍ (m) + 𑒫 (va) gives the ligature mva:

- 𑒓୍ (ŋ) + 𑒫 (va) gives the ligature ŋva:

- 𑒝୍ (ṇ) + 𑒫 (va) gives the ligature ṇva:

- 𑒢୍ (n) + 𑒫 (va) gives the ligature nva:

- 𑒘୍ (ñ) + 𑒫 (va) gives the ligature ñva:

- 𑒤୍ (pʰ) + 𑒫 (va) gives the ligature pʰva:

- 𑒣୍ (p) + 𑒫 (va) gives the ligature pva:

- 𑒩୍ (r) + 𑒫 (va) gives the ligature rva:

- 𑒬୍ (ʃ) + 𑒫 (va) gives the ligature ʃva:

- 𑒭୍ (ṣ) + 𑒫 (va) gives the ligature ṣva:

- 𑒮୍ (s) + 𑒫 (va) gives the ligature sva:

- 𑒟୍ (tʰ) + 𑒫 (va) gives the ligature tʰva:

- 𑒚୍ (ṭʰ) + 𑒫 (va) gives the ligature ṭʰva:

- 𑒙୍ (ṭ) + 𑒫 (va) gives the ligature ṭva:

- 𑒞୍ (t) + 𑒫 (va) gives the ligature tva:

- 𑒫୍ (v) + 𑒩 (ra) gives the ligature vra:

- 𑒫୍ (v) + 𑒫 (va) gives the ligature vva:

- 𑒨୍ (y) + 𑒫 (va) gives the ligature yva:

== Khmer Vo ==
វ	្វ	ួ
Independent	Subscript	ua
Khmer independent and subjoined letter Vo.

Vo (វ) is a consonant of the Khmer abugida. It ultimately arose from the Brahmi letter, via the Pallava letter Va. Like in other Indic scripts, Khmer consonants have the inherent vowel "a", and take one of several modifying vowel signs to represent syllables with another vowel. Actually, the sounds of the vowels are modified by the consonant; see the article on the Khmer writing system for details.

Khmer Vo with vowel matras
Va	Vā	Vi	Vī	Vu	Vū	Vr̥	Vr̥̄	Vl̥	Vl̥̄	Ve	Vai	Vo	Vau	Vẏ	Vȳ	Vua	Voe	Vẏa	Via	Vae	Và
វ	វា	វិ	វី	វុ	វូ	វ្ឫ	វ្ឬ	វ្ឭ	វ្ឮ	វេ	វៃ	វោ	វៅ	វឹ	វឺ	វួ	វើ	វឿ	វៀ	វែ	វៈ

Note: The vowels (other than vocalic liquids) are shown using the ALA-LC scheme.

Pali and Sanskrit are written as abugidas with the lack of a vowel between consonants notated as consonants indicated by vertically stacking the consonants without their touching. For phonetically final consonants, the lack of a vowel is marked by virama.

The Khmer language works the same, except that a different method is used for the last consonant of a word. The final consonant in a consonant stack is indicated as having no implicit vowel by applying tôndôkhéad to it. By default, a consonant surmounted by robat is silent and lacks an inherent vowel. The yŭkôlpĭntŭ positively indicates the presence of a final implicit vowel, plus its automatic glottal stop. Otherwise, there is no final vowel, unless the word is of Pali or Sanskrit origin, in which case the spelling is ambiguous. Up until the start of the 20th century, the lack of a final vowel could be indicating by subscripting the consonant, as then done in Lao and in other non-Indic languages using the Tai Tham script. As in the Thai, Lao and Tai Tham scripts, Va served as a mater lectionis representing the sound /ua/. In this rôle, it was subscripted. In Cambodian usage, a new form of subscript was developed for consonantal usage, and the two are now used contrastively.

== Tai Tham Wa ==
Tai Tham independent, subjoined and superscript letter Wa.

Wa (ᩅ) is a consonant of the Tai Tham abugida. It ultimately arose from the Brahmi letter, via the Pallava letter Va. Like in other Indic scripts, Tai Tham consonants have the inherent vowel "a", and take one of several modifying vowel signs to represent syllables with another vowel.

Tai Tham Wa with vowel matras
Syllable type	Va	Vā	Vi	Vī	Vư	Vư̄	Vu	Vū	Vē	Vǣ	Vō
Closed or open	ᩅ	ᩅᩤ	ᩅᩥ	ᩅᩦ	ᩅᩧ	ᩅᩨ	ᩅᩩ	ᩅᩪ	ᩅᩮ	ᩅᩯ	ᩅᩮᩤ
	Vai	Vaư	Vau				Vō̹i				
Open	ᩅᩱ	ᩅᩲ	ᩅᩮᩢᩤ	ᩅᩮᩫᩢᩤ	ᩅᩮᩫᩤ	ᩅᩳ	ᩅᩭ				
	Vo	Va	Vō	Vœ̄		Vō̹				Vo̹	
Open	ᩅᩰᩡ	ᩅᩡ	ᩅᩰ	ᩅᩮᩬᩥ	ᩅᩮᩦ	ᩅᩬᩴ	ᩅᩴ	ᩅᩬᩳ	ᩅᩳ	ᩅᩰᩬᩡ	ᩅᩰᩬ
Closed	ᩅᩫ	ᩅᩢ	ᩅᩰᩫ	ᩅᩮᩥ	ᩅᩮᩦ	ᩅᩬ				ᩅᩬᩢ	
	Vūa	Vīa		Vư̄a							
Open	ᩅ᩠ᩅᩫ	ᩅ᩠ᨿᩮ	ᩅᩮᩢ᩠ᨿ	ᩅᩮᩬᩥᩋ	ᩅᩮᩬᩨᩋ	ᩅᩮᩬᩨ					
Closed	ᩅ᩠ᩅ	ᩅ᩠ᨿ		ᩅᩮᩬᩥ	ᩅᩮᩬᩨ						

Notes:

1. The transliteration scheme is an amalgamation of the ALA-LC schemes of Khmer, Pali and Lao.
2. Many of the matras include subscript wa, subscript ya, subscript a or even the letter a itself. Anusvara and visarga are also used.
3. In the relevant Tai languages, a short vowel in an open syllable includes an underlyinɡ ɡlottal stop.

Additional short vowels not shown above may be synthesised from the corresponding long vowel by appending visarga for open syllables (as shown for Vo) or applying mai sat for closed syllables (as shown for Vo̹). Unlike the other languages, Lao instead replaces an ī or ư̄ glyph by the corresponding short vowel.

The lack of a vowel between consonants notated as consonants is indicated by vertically stacking the consonants, generally without their touching. The Brahmi style of writing final consonants small and low developed, as vestigially seen in Khmer and Lao, into using subscripting to indicate that a consonant had no vowel of its own. In theory this leaves it ambiguous as to whether a consonant precedes or follows the vowel, but ambiguous cases are rare. Finally, if there is no room for the consonant below, it may be left as an 'independent' consonant or. in some cases, written superscript. Occasionally the visible virama (ra haam) is used, but this may signify that the consonant so marked is silent. The vowel /a/ will be made explicit if the final consonant is notated by a letter and is included in the same stack as the initial consonant or is written in a stack just consisting of that consonant.

Thus Wa may appear as the 'base' consonant with almost any other consonant. Northern Thai traditionally allows it to form an initial consonant cluster with almost any other consonant sound, it can act as a mater lectionis (as shown in the list of matras above for Vūa), and it can be a final consonant, as in the fairly common rime -iv, e.g. 'to be hungry'. To accommodate a lack of space below the base consonants, there are several strategies:

1. Subscript Wa can be written significantly smaller than usual, typically at the size of anusvara. Certain other consonants also exhibit vertically compressed subscript forms, most notably La and Nga.
2. Subscript Wa can be nested within subscript Ma and Na, e.g. Northern Thai <hmūaḍ> /muːat/ 'to twist'.
3. A sequence of subscript items can be written horizontally, rather than vertically. This sequence can continue beneath another base consonant. It can sometime be hard to see that the second subscript belongs with the first consonant rather than the second.
4. For several letters, including Wa, if the space below the base letter is occupied, a final consonant can be written above instead. The result for Wa is frequently indistinguishable from anusvara, and is currently encoded the same, namely as TAI THAM SIGN MAI KANG. It occurs in the sequence <Ya, Wa>, as in the Tai Lue word ᨯ᩠ᨿᩴ '(just) one', where the subscripted letter Ya is used as a mater lectionis. This practice is extremely rare for Wa in Northern Thai.

For example, Northern Thai <hlūaṅ> 'big' can be written as:

1. - two stacks of (1) ha, la, wa all stacked vertically and (2) ṅa;
2. - two stacks: (1) a bent stack of ha, la below ha, wa to the right of la and (2) the single character ṅa. Visually, this is only subtly different from the meaningless two stacks of (1) ha, la and (2) ṅa, wa - ;
3. - two stacks of (1) ha, la and (2) wa, ṅa;

The first two alternatives have the same encoding in Unicode; the font and its configuration determine the rendering.

== Comparison of Va ==
The various Indic scripts are generally related to each other through adaptation and borrowing, and as such the glyphs for cognate letters, including Va, are related as well.

Comparison of Va in different scripts

Aramaic
Kharoṣṭhī 𐨬	Ashoka Brahmi	Kushana Brahmi (Note: The middle "Kushana" form of Brahmi is a later style that emerged as Brahmi scripts were beginning to proliferate. Gupta Brahmi was definitely a stylistic descendant from Kushana, but other Brahmi-derived scripts may have descended from earlier forms.)	Tocharian (Note: Tocharian is probably derived from the middle period "Kushana" form of Brahmi, although artifacts from that time are not plentiful enough to establish a definite succession.) /
Gupta Brahmi	Pallava
Kadamba -
Bhaiksuki 𑰪	Siddhaṃ	Grantha 𑌵	Cham ꨥ
Sinhala ව	Pyu / Old Mon (Note: Pyu and Old Mon are probably the precursors of the Burmese script, and may be derived from either the Pallava or Kadamba script) -
Tibetan ཝ	Newa 𑐰	Ahom -	Malayalam വ
Telugu వ	Burmese ဝ
Lepcha ᰟ	Ranjana	Saurashtra ꢮ	Dives Akuru 𑤩
Kannada ವ	Kayah Li ꤠ
Limbu ᤘ	Soyombo (Note: May also be derived from Devangari (see bottom left of table)) 𑩾	Khmer វ	Tamil
Chakma 𑄤	Tai Tham ᩅ
Meitei Mayek ꯋ	Gaudi -	Thai ว	Lao ວ
Tai Le ᥝ
Marchen 𑲅	Tirhuta 𑒫	New Tai Lue ᦞ / ᦛ	Tai Viet ꪫ / ꪪ	Aksara Kawi
'Phags-pa ꡓ	Odia ଵ	Sharada 𑆮	Rejang ꥀ	Batak ᯋ / ᯍ	Buginese ᨓ
Zanabazar Square 𑨭	Bengali-Assamese	Takri 𑚦	Javanese ꦮ	Balinese ᬯ	Makasar 𑻯
Hangul (Note: The Origin of Hangul from 'Phags-pa is one of limited influence, inspiring at most a few basic letter shapes. Hangul does not function as an Indic abugida.) -	Northern Nagari -	Dogri 𑠦	Laṇḍā -	Sundanese ᮝ	Baybayin ᜏ
Modi 𑘪	Gujarati વ	Khojki 𑈨	Khudabadi 𑋛	Mahajani 𑅯	Tagbanwa ᝯ
Devanagari	Nandinagari 𑧊	Kaithi	Gurmukhi ਵ	Multani 𑊤	Buhid ᝏ
Canadian Syllabics (Note: Although the basic letter forms of the Canadian Aboriginal Syllabics were derived from handwritten Devanagari letters, this abugida indicates vowel sounds by rotations of the letter form, rather than the use of vowel diacritics as is standard in Indic abugidas.) -	Soyombo (Note: May also be derived from Ranjana (see above)) 𑩾	Sylheti Nagari ꠛ	Gunjala Gondi 𑵭	Masaram Gondi (Note: Masaram Gondi acts as an Indic abugida, but its letterforms were not derived from any single precursor script.) 𑴨	Hanuno'o ᜯ

== Character encodings of Va ==
Most Indic scripts are encoded in the Unicode Standard, and as such the letter Va in those scripts can be represented in plain text with unique codepoint. Va from several modern-use scripts can also be found in legacy encodings, such as ISCII.

Character information
Preview							వ		ଵ		ವ		വ		વ		ਵ	
Unicode name	DEVANAGARI LETTER VA		BENGALI LETTER BA		TAMIL LETTER VA		TELUGU LETTER VA		ORIYA LETTER VA		KANNADA LETTER VA		MALAYALAM LETTER VA		GUJARATI LETTER VA		GURMUKHI LETTER VA	
Encodings	decimal	hex	dec	hex	dec	hex	dec	hex	dec	hex	dec	hex	dec	hex	dec	hex	dec	hex
Unicode	2357	U+0935	2476	U+09AC	2997	U+0BB5	3125	U+0C35	2869	U+0B35	3253	U+0CB5	3381	U+0D35	2741	U+0AB5	2613	U+0A35
UTF-8	224 164 181	E0 A4 B5	224 166 172	E0 A6 AC	224 174 181	E0 AE B5	224 176 181	E0 B0 B5	224 172 181	E0 AC B5	224 178 181	E0 B2 B5	224 180 181	E0 B4 B5	224 170 181	E0 AA B5	224 168 181	E0 A8 B5
Numeric character reference	&#2357;	&#x935;	&#2476;	&#x9AC;	&#2997;	&#xBB5;	&#3125;	&#xC35;	&#2869;	&#xB35;	&#3253;	&#xCB5;	&#3381;	&#xD35;	&#2741;	&#xAB5;	&#2613;	&#xA35;
ISCII	212	D4	212	D4	212	D4	212	D4	212	D4	212	D4	212	D4	212	D4	212	D4

Character information
Preview	Ashoka Kushana Gupta		𐨬				𑌵	
Unicode name	BRAHMI LETTER VA		KHAROSHTHI LETTER VA		SIDDHAM LETTER VA		GRANTHA LETTER VA	
Encodings	decimal	hex	dec	hex	dec	hex	dec	hex
Unicode	69679	U+1102F	68140	U+10A2C	71082	U+115AA	70453	U+11335
UTF-8	240 145 128 175	F0 91 80 AF	240 144 168 172	F0 90 A8 AC	240 145 150 170	F0 91 96 AA	240 145 140 181	F0 91 8C B5
UTF-16	55300 56367	D804 DC2F	55298 56876	D802 DE2C	55301 56746	D805 DDAA	55300 57141	D804 DF35
Numeric character reference	&#69679;	&#x1102F;	&#68140;	&#x10A2C;	&#71082;	&#x115AA;	&#70453;	&#x11335;

Character information
Preview	ཝ		ྭ		ꡓ		𑨭		𑐰		𑰪		𑆮	
Unicode name	TIBETAN LETTER WA		TIBETAN SUBJOINED LETTER WA		PHAGS-PA LETTER WA		ZANABAZAR SQUARE LETTER VA		NEWA LETTER WA		BHAIKSUKI LETTER VA		SHARADA LETTER VA	
Encodings	decimal	hex	dec	hex	dec	hex	dec	hex	dec	hex	dec	hex	dec	hex
Unicode	3933	U+0F5D	4013	U+0FAD	43091	U+A853	72237	U+11A2D	70704	U+11430	72746	U+11C2A	70062	U+111AE
UTF-8	224 189 157	E0 BD 9D	224 190 173	E0 BE AD	234 161 147	EA A1 93	240 145 168 173	F0 91 A8 AD	240 145 144 176	F0 91 90 B0	240 145 176 170	F0 91 B0 AA	240 145 134 174	F0 91 86 AE
UTF-16	3933	0F5D	4013	0FAD	43091	A853	55302 56877	D806 DE2D	55301 56368	D805 DC30	55303 56362	D807 DC2A	55300 56750	D804 DDAE
Numeric character reference	&#3933;	&#xF5D;	&#4013;	&#xFAD;	&#43091;	&#xA853;	&#72237;	&#x11A2D;	&#70704;	&#x11430;	&#72746;	&#x11C2A;	&#70062;	&#x111AE;

Character information
Preview	ဝ		ᩅ		ᩴ		ᦞ		ᦛ		ᧁ	
Unicode name	MYANMAR LETTER WA		TAI THAM LETTER WA		TAI THAM SIGN MAI KANG		NEW TAI LUE LETTER LOW VA		NEW TAI LUE LETTER HIGH VA		NEW TAI LUE LETTER FINAL V	
Encodings	decimal	hex	dec	hex	dec	hex	dec	hex	dec	hex	dec	hex
Unicode	4125	U+101D	6725	U+1A45	6772	U+1A74	6558	U+199E	6555	U+199B	6593	U+19C1
UTF-8	225 128 157	E1 80 9D	225 169 133	E1 A9 85	225 169 180	E1 A9 B4	225 166 158	E1 A6 9E	225 166 155	E1 A6 9B	225 167 129	E1 A7 81
Numeric character reference	&#4125;	&#x101D;	&#6725;	&#x1A45;	&#6772;	&#x1A74;	&#6558;	&#x199E;	&#6555;	&#x199B;	&#6593;	&#x19C1;

Character information
Preview	វ		ួ		ວ		ว		ꪫ		ꪪ	
Unicode name	KHMER LETTER VO		KHMER VOWEL SIGN UA		LAO LETTER WO		THAI CHARACTER WO WAEN		TAI VIET LETTER HIGH VO		TAI VIET LETTER LOW VO	
Encodings	decimal	hex	dec	hex	dec	hex	dec	hex	dec	hex	dec	hex
Unicode	6044	U+179C	6077	U+17BD	3751	U+0EA7	3623	U+0E27	43691	U+AAAB	43690	U+AAAA
UTF-8	225 158 156	E1 9E 9C	225 158 189	E1 9E BD	224 186 167	E0 BA A7	224 184 167	E0 B8 A7	234 170 171	EA AA AB	234 170 170	EA AA AA
Numeric character reference	&#6044;	&#x179C;	&#6077;	&#x17BD;	&#3751;	&#xEA7;	&#3623;	&#xE27;	&#43691;	&#xAAAB;	&#43690;	&#xAAAA;

Character information
Preview	ව		ꤠ		𑄤		ᥝ		𑤩		ꢮ		ꨥ	
Unicode name	SINHALA LETTER VAYANNA		KAYAH LI LETTER VA		CHAKMA LETTER WAA		TAI LE LETTER VA		DIVES AKURU LETTER VA		SAURASHTRA LETTER VA		CHAM LETTER VA	
Encodings	decimal	hex	dec	hex	dec	hex	dec	hex	dec	hex	dec	hex	dec	hex
Unicode	3520	U+0DC0	43296	U+A920	69924	U+11124	6493	U+195D	71977	U+11929	43182	U+A8AE	43557	U+AA25
UTF-8	224 183 128	E0 B7 80	234 164 160	EA A4 A0	240 145 132 164	F0 91 84 A4	225 165 157	E1 A5 9D	240 145 164 169	F0 91 A4 A9	234 162 174	EA A2 AE	234 168 165	EA A8 A5
UTF-16	3520	0DC0	43296	A920	55300 56612	D804 DD24	6493	195D	55302 56617	D806 DD29	43182	A8AE	43557	AA25
Numeric character reference	&#3520;	&#xDC0;	&#43296;	&#xA920;	&#69924;	&#x11124;	&#6493;	&#x195D;	&#71977;	&#x11929;	&#43182;	&#xA8AE;	&#43557;	&#xAA25;

Character information
Preview	𑘪		𑧊		𑩾		ꠛ		𑵭			
Unicode name	MODI LETTER VA		NANDINAGARI LETTER VA		SOYOMBO LETTER VA		SYLOTI NAGRI LETTER BO		GUNJALA GONDI LETTER VA		KAITHI LETTER VA	
Encodings	decimal	hex	dec	hex	dec	hex	dec	hex	dec	hex	dec	hex
Unicode	71210	U+1162A	72138	U+119CA	72318	U+11A7E	43035	U+A81B	73069	U+11D6D	69803	U+110AB
UTF-8	240 145 152 170	F0 91 98 AA	240 145 167 138	F0 91 A7 8A	240 145 169 190	F0 91 A9 BE	234 160 155	EA A0 9B	240 145 181 173	F0 91 B5 AD	240 145 130 171	F0 91 82 AB
UTF-16	55301 56874	D805 DE2A	55302 56778	D806 DDCA	55302 56958	D806 DE7E	43035	A81B	55303 56685	D807 DD6D	55300 56491	D804 DCAB
Numeric character reference	&#71210;	&#x1162A;	&#72138;	&#x119CA;	&#72318;	&#x11A7E;	&#43035;	&#xA81B;	&#73069;	&#x11D6D;	&#69803;	&#x110AB;

Character information
Preview	𑒫		ᰟ		ᤘ		ꯋ		𑲅	
Unicode name	TIRHUTA LETTER VA		LEPCHA LETTER VA		LIMBU LETTER WA		MEETEI MAYEK LETTER WAI		MARCHEN LETTER WA	
Encodings	decimal	hex	dec	hex	dec	hex	dec	hex	dec	hex
Unicode	70827	U+114AB	7199	U+1C1F	6424	U+1918	43979	U+ABCB	72837	U+11C85
UTF-8	240 145 146 171	F0 91 92 AB	225 176 159	E1 B0 9F	225 164 152	E1 A4 98	234 175 139	EA AF 8B	240 145 178 133	F0 91 B2 85
UTF-16	55301 56491	D805 DCAB	7199	1C1F	6424	1918	43979	ABCB	55303 56453	D807 DC85
Numeric character reference	&#70827;	&#x114AB;	&#7199;	&#x1C1F;	&#6424;	&#x1918;	&#43979;	&#xABCB;	&#72837;	&#x11C85;

Character information
Preview	𑚦		𑠦		𑈨		𑋛		𑅯		𑊤	
Unicode name	TAKRI LETTER VA		DOGRA LETTER VA		KHOJKI LETTER VA		KHUDAWADI LETTER VA		MAHAJANI LETTER VA		MULTANI LETTER VA	
Encodings	decimal	hex	dec	hex	dec	hex	dec	hex	dec	hex	dec	hex
Unicode	71334	U+116A6	71718	U+11826	70184	U+11228	70363	U+112DB	69999	U+1116F	70308	U+112A4
UTF-8	240 145 154 166	F0 91 9A A6	240 145 160 166	F0 91 A0 A6	240 145 136 168	F0 91 88 A8	240 145 139 155	F0 91 8B 9B	240 145 133 175	F0 91 85 AF	240 145 138 164	F0 91 8A A4
UTF-16	55301 56998	D805 DEA6	55302 56358	D806 DC26	55300 56872	D804 DE28	55300 57051	D804 DEDB	55300 56687	D804 DD6F	55300 56996	D804 DEA4
Numeric character reference	&#71334;	&#x116A6;	&#71718;	&#x11826;	&#70184;	&#x11228;	&#70363;	&#x112DB;	&#69999;	&#x1116F;	&#70308;	&#x112A4;

Character information
Preview	ᬯ		ᯋ		ᨓ		ꦮ		𑻯		ꥀ		ᮝ	
Unicode name	BALINESE LETTER WA		BATAK LETTER WA		BUGINESE LETTER VA		JAVANESE LETTER WA		MAKASAR LETTER VA		REJANG LETTER WA		SUNDANESE LETTER WA	
Encodings	decimal	hex	dec	hex	dec	hex	dec	hex	dec	hex	dec	hex	dec	hex
Unicode	6959	U+1B2F	7115	U+1BCB	6675	U+1A13	43438	U+A9AE	73455	U+11EEF	43328	U+A940	7069	U+1B9D
UTF-8	225 172 175	E1 AC AF	225 175 139	E1 AF 8B	225 168 147	E1 A8 93	234 166 174	EA A6 AE	240 145 187 175	F0 91 BB AF	234 165 128	EA A5 80	225 174 157	E1 AE 9D
UTF-16	6959	1B2F	7115	1BCB	6675	1A13	43438	A9AE	55303 57071	D807 DEEF	43328	A940	7069	1B9D
Numeric character reference	&#6959;	&#x1B2F;	&#7115;	&#x1BCB;	&#6675;	&#x1A13;	&#43438;	&#xA9AE;	&#73455;	&#x11EEF;	&#43328;	&#xA940;	&#7069;	&#x1B9D;

Character information
Preview	ᜏ		ᝯ		ᝏ		ᜯ		𑴨	
Unicode name	TAGALOG LETTER WA		TAGBANWA LETTER WA		BUHID LETTER WA		HANUNOO LETTER WA		MASARAM GONDI LETTER VA	
Encodings	decimal	hex	dec	hex	dec	hex	dec	hex	dec	hex
Unicode	5903	U+170F	5999	U+176F	5967	U+174F	5935	U+172F	73000	U+11D28
UTF-8	225 156 143	E1 9C 8F	225 157 175	E1 9D AF	225 157 143	E1 9D 8F	225 156 175	E1 9C AF	240 145 180 168	F0 91 B4 A8
UTF-16	5903	170F	5999	176F	5967	174F	5935	172F	55303 56616	D807 DD28
Numeric character reference	&#5903;	&#x170F;	&#5999;	&#x176F;	&#5967;	&#x174F;	&#5935;	&#x172F;	&#73000;	&#x11D28;
