= Na (Indic) =

Letter "Na" in Indic scripts

Example glyphs
- Bengali–Assamese: Na
- Tibetan: Na
- Tamil: Na
- Thai: น
- Malayalam: ന
- Sinhala: න
- Ashoka Brahmi: Na
- Devanagari: Na

Cognates
- Hebrew: נ ,ן
- Greek: Ν
- Latin: N
- Cyrillic: Н

Properties
- Phonemic representation: /n/
- IAST transliteration: n N
- ISCII code point: C6 (198)

Na is a consonant of Indic abugidas. In modern Indic scripts, Na is derived from the early "Ashoka" Brahmi letter after having gone through the Gupta letter.

== Āryabhaṭa numeration ==
Aryabhata used Devanagari letters for numbers, very similar to the Greek numerals, even after the invention of Indian numerals. The values of the different forms of न are:

- न [nə] = 20 (२०)
- नि [nɪ] = 2,000 (२ ०००)
- नु [nʊ] = 200,000 (२ ०० ०००)
- नृ [nri] = 20,000,000 (२ ०० ०० ०००)
- नॢ [nlə] = 2×10^{9} (२ ×१०^{९})
- ने [ne] = 2×10^{11} (×१०^{११})
- नै [nɛː] = 2×10^{13} (×१०^{१३})
- नो [noː] = 2×10^{15} (×१०^{१५})
- नौ [nɔː] = 2×10^{17} (×१०^{१७})

== Historic Na ==
There are three different general early historic scripts - Brahmi and its variants, Kharoṣṭhī, and Tocharian, the so-called slanting Brahmi. Na as found in standard Brahmi, was a simple geometric shape, with variations toward more flowing forms by the Gupta. The Tocharian Na had an alternate Fremdzeichen form,. The third form of na, in Kharoshthi was probably derived from Aramaic separately from the Brahmi letter.

=== Brahmi Na ===
The Brahmi letter, Na, is probably derived from the Aramaic Nun, and is thus related to the modern Latin N and Greek Nu. Several identifiable styles of writing the Brahmi Na can be found, most associated with a specific set of inscriptions from an artifact or diverse records from an historic period. As the earliest and most geometric style of Brahmi, the letters found on the Edicts of Ashoka and other records from around that time are normally the reference form for Brahmi letters, with vowel marks not attested until later forms of Brahmi back-formed to match the geometric writing style.

Brahmi Na historic forms
Ashoka (3rd-1st c. BCE)	Girnar (~150 BCE)	Kushana (~150-250 CE)	Gujarat (~250 CE)	Gupta (~350 CE)

=== Tocharian Na ===
The Tocharian letter is derived from the Brahmi, and has an alternate Fremdzeichen form used in conjuncts and as an alternate representation of Nä.

Tocharian Na with vowel marks
Na	Nā	Ni	Nī	Nu	Nū	Nr	Nr̄	Ne	Nai	No	Nau	Nä	Fremdzeichen

=== Kharoṣṭhī Na ===
The Kharoṣṭhī letter is generally accepted as being derived from the Aramaic Nun, and is thus related to N and Nu, in addition to the Brahmi Na.

== Devanagari Na ==
Na (न) is a consonant of the Devanagari abugida. It ultimately arose from the Brahmi letter, after having gone through the Gupta letter. Letters that derive from it are the Gujarati letter ન, and the Modi letter 𑘡.

=== Devanagari-using Languages ===
In all languages, न is pronounced as [nə] or [n] when appropriate. Like all Indic scripts, Devanagari uses vowel marks attached to the base consonant to override the inherent /ə/ vowel:

Devanagari न with vowel marks
Na	Nā	Ni	Nī	Nu	Nū	Nr	Nr̄	Nl	Nl̄	Ne	Nai	No	Nau	N
न	ना	नि	नी	नु	नू	नृ	नॄ	नॢ	नॣ	ने	नै	नो	नौ	न्

=== Conjuncts with न ===
Half form of Na.

Devanagari exhibits conjunct ligatures, as is common in Indic scripts. In modern Devanagari texts, most conjuncts are formed by reducing the letter shape to fit tightly to the following letter, usually by dropping a character's vertical stem, sometimes referred to as a "half form". Some conjunct clusters are always represented by a true ligature, instead of a shape that can be broken into constituent independent letters. Vertically stacked conjuncts are ubiquitous in older texts, while only a few are still used routinely in modern Devanagari texts. The use of ligatures and vertical conjuncts may vary across languages using the Devanagari script, with Marathi in particular preferring the use of half forms where texts in other languages would show ligatures and vertical stacks.

==== Ligature conjuncts of न ====
True ligatures are quite rare in Indic scripts. The most common ligated conjuncts in Devanagari are in the form of a slight mutation to fit in context or as a consistent variant form appended to the adjacent characters. Those variants include the Repha and Rakar forms of Ra. Nepali and Marathi texts use the "eyelash" Ra half form for an initial "R" instead of repha.

- न্ (n) + न (na) gives the ligature nna: ^{note}

- Repha र্ (r) + न (na) gives the ligature rna:

- Eyelash र্ (r) + न (na) gives the ligature rna:

- न্ (n) + rakar र (ra) gives the ligature nra:

==== Stacked conjuncts of न ====
Vertically stacked ligatures are the most common conjunct forms found in Devanagari text. Although the constituent characters may need to be stretched and moved slightly in order to stack neatly, stacked conjuncts can be broken down into recognizable base letters, or a letter and an otherwise standard ligature. As the trailing letter in many conjuncts, Na will show a reduced form, angling down and to the right in order to stack under the preceding consonant.

- भ্ (b^{h}) + न (na) gives the ligature b^{h}na:

- ब্ (b) + न (na) gives the ligature bna:

- छ্ (c^{h}) + न (na) gives the ligature c^{h}na:

- च্ (c) + न (na) gives the ligature cna:

- ढ্ (ḍʱ) + न (na) gives the ligature ḍʱna:

- ड্ (ḍ) + न (na) gives the ligature ḍna:

- ध্ (dʱ) + न (na) gives the ligature dʱna:

- द্ (d) + न (na) gives the ligature dna:

- घ্ (ɡʱ) + न (na) gives the ligature ɡʱna:

- ग্ (g) + न (na) gives the ligature gna:

- ग্ (g) + न্ (n) + य (ya) gives the ligature gnya:

- ह্ (h) + न (na) gives the ligature hna:

- झ্ (j^{h}) + न (na) gives the ligature j^{h}na:

- ज্ (j) + न (na) gives the ligature jna:

- ख্ (k^{h}) + न (na) gives the ligature k^{h}na:

- क্ (k) + न (na) gives the ligature kna:

- ल্ (l) + न (na) gives the ligature lna:

- म্ (m) + न (na) gives the ligature mna:

- न্ (n) + च (ca) gives the ligature nca:

- न্ (n) + द্ (d) + ध (dʱa) gives the ligature nddʱa:

- ङ্ (ŋ) + न (na) gives the ligature ŋna:

- न্ (n) + ज (ja) gives the ligature nja:

- न্ (n) + ज্ (j) + ञ (ña) gives the ligature njña:

- न্ (n) + ल (la) gives the ligature nla:

- ण্ (ṇ) + न (na) gives the ligature ṇna:

- न্ (n) + ञ (ña) gives the ligature nña:

- ञ্ (ñ) + न (na) gives the ligature ñna:

- फ্ (p^{h}) + न (na) gives the ligature p^{h}na:

- प্ (p) + न (na) gives the ligature pna:

- श্ (ʃ) + न (na) gives the ligature ʃna:

- स্ (s) + न (na) gives the ligature sna:

- ष্ (ṣ) + न (na) gives the ligature ṣna:

- थ্ (t^{h}) + न (na) gives the ligature t^{h}na:

- त্ (t) + न (na) gives the ligature tna:

- ठ্ (ṭ^{h}) + न (na) gives the ligature ṭ^{h}na:

- ट্ (ṭ) + न (na) gives the ligature ṭna:

- त্ (t) + त্ (t) + न (na) gives the ligature ttna:

- व্ (v) + न (na) gives the ligature vna:

- य্ (y) + न (na) gives the ligature yna:

== Bengali Na ==
The Bengali script ন is derived from the Siddhaṃ, and is marked by a similar horizontal head line, but less geometric shape, than its Devanagari counterpart, न. The inherent vowel of Bengali consonant letters is /ɔ/, so the bare letter ন will sometimes be transliterated as "no" instead of "na". Adding okar, the "o" vowel mark, gives a reading of /n̪o/. Like all Indic consonants, ন can be modified by marks to indicate another (or no) vowel than its inherent "a".

Bengali ন with vowel marks
na	nā	ni	nī	nu	nū	nr	nr̄	ne	nai	no	nau	n
ন	না	নি	নী	নু	নূ	নৃ	নৄ	নে	নৈ	নো	নৌ	ন্

=== ন in Bengali-using languages ===
ন is used as a basic consonant character in all of the major Bengali script orthographies, including Bengali and Assamese.

=== Conjuncts with ন ===
Bengali ন exhibits conjunct ligatures, as is common in Indic scripts, with a tendency towards a trailing ন realized as a reduced form in stacked ligatures, similar to Va-phala, and initial ন appending a reduced form onto the vertical stemline of the following consonant, or as a fully stacked ligature.

- ধ্ (dʱ) + ন (na) gives the ligature dʱna:

- ঘ্ (ɡʱ) + ন (na) gives the ligature ɡʱna:

- গ্ (g) + ন (na) gives the ligature gna:

- গ্ (g) + ন্ (n) + য (ya) gives the ligature gnya, with the ya phala suffix:

- ক্ (k) + ষ্ (ṣ) + ন (na) gives the ligature kṣna:

- ম্ (m) + ন (na) gives the ligature mna:

- ন্ (n) + দ (da) gives the ligature nda:

- ন্ (n) + ড (ḍa) gives the ligature nḍa:

- ন্ (n) + ড্ (ḍ) + র (ra) gives the ligature nḍra, with the ra phala suffix:

- ন্ (n) + ধ (dʱa) gives the ligature ndʱa:

- ন্ (n) + ধ্ (dʱ) + র (ra) gives the ligature ndʱra, with the ra phala suffix:

- ন্ (n) + ধ্ (dʱ) + য (ya) gives the ligature ndʱya, with the ya phala suffix:

- ন্ (n) + দ্ (d) + র (ra) gives the ligature ndra, with the ra phala suffix:

- ন্ (n) + দ্ (d) + ব (va) gives the ligature ndva, with the va phala suffix:

- ন্ (n) + দ্ (d) + য (ya) gives the ligature ndya, with the ya phala suffix:

- ন্ (n) + ম (ma) gives the ligature nma:

- ন্ (n) + ন (na) gives the ligature nna:

- ন্ (n) + ত (ta) gives the ligature nta:

- ন্ (n) + থ (t^{h}a) gives the ligature nt^{h}a:

- ন্ (n) + থ্ (t^{h}) + র (ra) gives the ligature nt^{h}ra, with the ra phala suffix:

- ন্ (n) + ত্ (t) + র (ra) gives the ligature ntra, with the ra phala suffix:

- ন্ (n) + ত্ (t) + র্ (r) + য (ya) gives the ligature ntrya, with the ra phala and ya phala suffixes

- ন্ (n) + ট (ṭa) gives the ligature nṭa:

- ন্ (n) + ঠ (ṭ^{h}a) gives the ligature nṭ^{h}a:

- ন্ (n) + ট্ (ṭ) + র (ra) gives the ligature nṭra, with the ra phala suffix:

- ন্ (n) + ত্ (t) + ব (va) gives the ligature ntva, with the va phala suffix:

- ন্ (n) + ত্ (t) + য (ya) gives the ligature ntya, with the ya phala suffix:

- ন্ (n) + ব (va) gives the ligature nva, with the va phala suffix:

- ন্ (n) + য (ya) gives the ligature nya, with the ya phala suffix:

- প্ (p) + ন (na) gives the ligature pna:

- র্ (r) + ন (na) gives the ligature rna, with the repha prefix:

- শ্ (ʃ) + ন (na) gives the ligature ʃna:

- স্ (s) + ন (na) gives the ligature sna:

- ত্ (t) + ন (na) gives the ligature tna:

== Gujarati Na ==
Gujarati Na.

Na (ન) is the twentieth consonant of the Gujarati abugida. It is derived from the Devanagari Na with the top bar (shiro rekha) removed, and ultimately the Brahmi letter.

=== Gujarati-using Languages ===
The Gujarati script is used to write the Gujarati and Kutchi languages. In both languages, ન is pronounced as [nə] or [n] when appropriate. Like all Indic scripts, Gujarati uses vowel marks attached to the base consonant to override the inherent /ə/ vowel:

Na	Nā	Ni	Nī	Nu	Nū	Nr	Nl	Nr̄	Nl̄	Nĕ	Ne	Nai	Nŏ	No	Nau	N
Gujarati Na syllables, with vowel marks in red.

=== Conjuncts with ન ===
Half form of Na.

Gujarati ન exhibits conjunct ligatures, much like its parent Devanagari Script. Most Gujarati conjuncts can only be formed by reducing the letter shape to fit tightly to the following letter, usually by dropping a character's vertical stem, sometimes referred to as a "half form". A few conjunct clusters can be represented by a true ligature, instead of a shape that can be broken into constituent independent letters, and vertically stacked conjuncts can also be found in Gujarati, although much less commonly than in Devanagari. True ligatures are quite rare in Indic scripts. The most common ligated conjuncts in Gujarati are in the form of a slight mutation to fit in context or as a consistent variant form appended to the adjacent characters. One of the most common variants includes a form of Na that angles downward. Other non-half form variants include the Repha and Rakar forms of Ra.

- ર્ (r) + ન (na) gives the ligature RNa:

- ન્ (n) + ર (ra) gives the ligature NRa:

- ન્ (n) + ન (na) gives the ligature NNa:

- ડ્ (ɖ) + ન (na) gives the ligature ḌNa:

- ઢ્ (ɖʱ) + ન (na) gives the ligature ḌhNa:

- ખ્ (k^{h}) + ન (na) gives the ligature KhNa:

- ગ્ (g) + ન (na) gives the ligature GNa:

- ઘ્ (ɡʱ) + ન (na) gives the ligature GhNa:

- ચ્ (c) + ન (na) gives the ligature CNa:

- ઞ્ (ɲ) + ન (na) gives the ligature ÑNa:

- ત્ (t) + ન (na) gives the ligature TNa:

- થ્ (t^{h}) + ન (na) gives the ligature ThNa:

- દ્ (d) + ન (na) gives the ligature DNa:

- ધ્ (dʱ) + ન (na) gives the ligature DhNa:

- પ્ (p) + ન (na) gives the ligature PNa:

- બ્ (b) + ન (na) gives the ligature BNa:

- ભ્ (b^{h}) + ન (na) gives the ligature BhNa:

- મ્ (m) + ન (na) gives the ligature MNa:

- ય્ (y) + ન (na) gives the ligature YNa:

- લ્ (l) + ન (na) gives the ligature LNa:

- ળ્ (ɭ̆) + ન (na) gives the ligature LlNa:

- વ્ (v) + ન (na) gives the ligature VNa:

- શ્ (ʃ) + ન (na) gives the ligature ŚNa:

- હ્ (h) + ન (na) gives the ligature HNa:

== Telugu Na ==
Telugu independent and subjoined Na.

Na (న) is a consonant of the Telugu abugida. It ultimately arose from the Brahmi letter. It is closely related to the Kannada letter ನ. Most Telugu consonants contain a v-shaped headstroke that is related to the horizontal headline found in other Indic scripts, although headstrokes do not connect adjacent letters in Telugu. The headstroke is normally lost when adding vowel matras. Telugu conjuncts are created by reducing trailing letters to a subjoined form that appears below the initial consonant of the conjunct. Many subjoined forms are created by dropping their headline, with many extending the end of the stroke of the main letter body to form an extended tail reaching up to the right of the preceding consonant. This subjoining of trailing letters to create conjuncts is in contrast to the leading half forms of Devanagari and Bengali letters. Ligature conjuncts are not a feature in Telugu, with the only non-standard construction being an alternate subjoined form of Ṣa (borrowed from Kannada) in the KṢa conjunct.

== Malayalam Na ==
Malayalam letter Na

Na (ന) is a consonant of the Malayalam abugida. It ultimately arose from the Brahmi letter, via the Grantha letter Na. Like in other Indic scripts, Malayalam consonants have the inherent vowel "a", and take one of several modifying vowel signs to represent syllables with another vowel or no vowel at all.

Malayalam Na matras: Na, Nā, Ni, Nī, Nu, Nū, Nr̥, Nr̥̄, Nl̥, Nl̥̄, Ne, Nē, Nai, No, Nō, Nau, and N.

=== Conjuncts of ന ===
Malayalam letter Chillu N

As is common in Indic scripts, Malayalam joins letters together to form conjunct consonant clusters. There are several ways in which conjuncts are formed in Malayalam texts: using a post-base form of a trailing consonant placed under the initial consonant of a conjunct, a combined ligature of two or more consonants joined together, a conjoining form that appears as a combining mark on the rest of the conjunct, the use of an explicit candrakkala mark to suppress the inherent "a" vowel, or a special consonant form called a "chillu" letter, representing a bare consonant without the inherent "a" vowel. Texts written with the modern reformed Malayalam orthography, put̪iya lipi, may favor more regular conjunct forms than older texts in paḻaya lipi, due to changes undertaken in the 1970s by the Government of Kerala.

- ന് (n) + ത (ta) gives the ligature nta:

- ന് (n) + ഥ (t^{h}a) gives the ligature nt^{h}a:

- ന് (n) + ദ (da) gives the ligature nda:

- ന് (n) + ധ (dʱa) gives the ligature ndʱa:

- ക് (k) + ന (na) gives the ligature kna:

- ഗ് (g) + ന (na) gives the ligature gna:

- ഘ് (ɡʱ) + ന (na) gives the ligature ɡʱna:

- ത് (t) + ന (na) gives the ligature tna:

- ന് (n) + ന (na) gives the ligature nna:

- പ് (p) + ന (na) gives the ligature pna:

- ശ് (ʃ) + ന (na) gives the ligature ʃna:

- സ് (s) + ന (na) gives the ligature sna:

- ഹ് (h) + ന (na) gives the ligature hna:

- ന് (n) + മ (ma) gives the ligature nma:

- ന് (n) + റ (rra) gives the ligature nrra:

== Canadian Aboriginal Syllabics Ne ==
ᓀ, ᓂ, ᓄ and ᓇ are the base characters "Ne", "Ni", "No" and "Na" in the Canadian Aboriginal Syllabics. The bare consonant ᓐ (N) is a small version of the A-series letter ᓇ, although the Western Cree letter ᐣ, derived from Pitman shorthand was the original bare consonant symbol for N. The character ᓀ is derived from a handwritten form of the Devanagari letter न, without the headline or vertical stem, and the forms for different vowels are derived by mirroring.

Unlike most writing systems without legacy computer encodings, complex Canadian syllabic letters are represented in Unicode with pre-composed characters, rather than with base characters and diacritical marks.

Variant	E-series		I-series		O-series		A-series			Other
N + vowel	ᓀ		ᓂ		ᓄ		ᓇ			ᢼ
N + vowel	Ne		Ni		No		Na			Nay
Small	-		ᣙ		ᓒ		ᓐ			ᐣ
Small	-		Ojibway N		Nh		N			Cree N
N with long vowels	-		ᓃ		ᓅ	ᓆ	ᓈ			ᓁ
N with long vowels	-		Nī		Nō	Cree Nō	Nā			Nāi
N + W-vowels	ᓉ	ᓊ	ᣆ	ᣇ	ᣊ	ᣋ	ᓋ		ᓌ	-
N + W-vowels	Nwe	Cree Nwe	Nwi	Ojibway Nwi	Now	Ojibway Now	Nwa		Cree Nwa	-
N + long W-vowels	-		ᣈ	ᣉ	ᣌ	ᣍ	ᓍ	ᓏ	ᓎ	-
N + long W-vowels	-		Nwī	Ojibway Nwī	Nwō	Ojibway Nwō	Nwā	Naskapi Nwā	Cree Nwā	-
Woods-Cree Th	ᖛ		ᖜ		ᖝ		ᖞ			ᖟ
Woods-Cree Th	The		Thi		Tho		Tha			Th

== Odia Na ==
Odia independent and subjoined letter Na.

Na (ନ) is a consonant of the Odia abugida. It ultimately arose from the Brahmi letter, via the Siddhaṃ letter Na. Like in other Indic scripts, Odia consonants have the inherent vowel "a", and take one of several modifying vowel signs to represent syllables with another vowel or no vowel at all.

Odia Na with vowel matras
Na	Nā	Ni	Nī	Nu	Nū	Nr̥	Nr̥̄	Nl̥	Nl̥̄	Ne	Nai	No	Nau	N
ନ	ନା	ନି	ନୀ	ନୁ	ନୂ	ନୃ	ନୄ	ନୢ	ନୣ	ନେ	ନୈ	ନୋ	ନୌ	ନ୍

=== Conjuncts of ନ ===
As is common in Indic scripts, Odia joins letters together to form conjunct consonant clusters. The most common conjunct formation is achieved by using a small subjoined form of trailing consonants. Most consonants' subjoined forms are identical to the full form, just reduced in size, although a few drop the curved headline or have a subjoined form not directly related to the full form of the consonant. The subjoined form of Na is one of these mismatched forms, and is referred to as "Na Phala". The second type of conjunct formation is through pure ligatures, where the constituent consonants are written together in a single graphic form. This ligature may be recognizable as being a combination of two characters or it can have a conjunct ligature unrelated to its constituent characters.

- ନ୍ (n) + ଦ (da) gives the ligature nda:

- ନ୍ (n) + ଧ (dʱa) gives the ligature ndʱa:

== Kaithi Na ==
Kaithi consonant and half-form Na.

Na (𑂢) is a consonant of the Kaithi abugida. It ultimately arose from the Brahmi letter, via the Siddhaṃ letter Na. Like in other Indic scripts, Kaithi consonants have the inherent vowel "a", and take one of several modifying vowel signs to represent syllables with another vowel or no vowel at all.

Kaithi Na with vowel matras
Na	Nā	Ni	Nī	Nu	Nū	Ne	Nai	No	Nau	N
𑂢	𑂢𑂰	𑂢𑂱	𑂢𑂲	𑂢𑂳	𑂢𑂴	𑂢𑂵	𑂢𑂶	𑂢𑂷	𑂢𑂸	𑂢𑂹

=== Conjuncts of 𑂢 ===
As is common in Indic scripts, Kaithi joins letters together to form conjunct consonant clusters. The most common conjunct formation is achieved by using a half form of preceding consonants, although several consonants use an explicit virama. Most half forms are derived from the full form by removing the vertical stem. As is common in most Indic scripts, conjuncts of ra are indicated with a repha or rakar mark attached to the rest of the consonant cluster. In addition, there are a few vertical conjuncts that can be found in Kaithi writing, but true ligatures are not used in the modern Kaithi script.

- 𑂩୍ (r) + 𑂢 (na) gives the ligature rna:

== Tirhuta Na ==
Tirhuta consonant Na

Na (𑒢) is a consonant of the Tirhuta abugida. It ultimately arose from the Brahmi letter, via the Siddhaṃ letter Na. Like in other Indic scripts, Tirhuta consonants have the inherent vowel "a", and take one of several modifying vowel signs to represent sylables with another vowel or no vowel at all.

Tirhuta Na with vowel matras
Na	Nā	Ni	Nī	Nu	Nū	Nṛ	Nṝ	Nḷ	Nḹ	Nē	Ne	Nai	Nō	No	Nau	N
𑒢	𑒢𑒰	𑒢𑒱	𑒢𑒲	𑒢𑒳	𑒢𑒴	𑒢𑒵	𑒢𑒶	𑒢𑒷	𑒢𑒸	𑒢𑒹	𑒢𑒺	𑒢𑒻	𑒢𑒼	𑒢𑒽	𑒢𑒾	𑒢𑓂

=== Conjuncts of 𑒢 ===
As is common in Indic scripts, Tirhuta joins letters together to form conjunct consonant clusters. The most common conjunct formation is achieved by using an explicit virama. As is common in most Indic scripts, conjuncts of ra are indicated with a repha or rakar mark attached to the rest of the consonant cluster. In addition, other consonants take unique combining forms when in conjunct with other letters, and there are several vertical conjuncts and true ligatures that can be found in Tirhuta writing.

- 𑒑୍ (g) + 𑒢 (na) gives the ligature gna:

- 𑒯୍ (h) + 𑒢 (na) gives the ligature hna:

- 𑒐୍ (kʰ) + 𑒢 (na) gives the ligature kʰna:

- 𑒢୍ (n) + 𑒠 (da) gives the ligature nda:

- 𑒢୍ (n) + 𑒡 (dʱa) gives the ligature ndʱa:

- 𑒢୍ (n) + 𑒯 (ha) gives the ligature nha:

- 𑒢୍ (n) + 𑒢 (na) gives the ligature nna:

- 𑒢୍ (n) + 𑒩 (ra) gives the ligature nra:

- 𑒢୍ (n) + 𑒞 (ta) gives the ligature nta:

- 𑒢 (n) + 𑒅 (u) gives the ligature nu:

- 𑒢୍ (n) + 𑒫 (va) gives the ligature nva:

- 𑒢୍ (n) + 𑒨 (ya) gives the ligature nya:

- 𑒤୍ (pʰ) + 𑒢 (na) gives the ligature pʰna:

- 𑒩୍ (r) + 𑒢 (na) gives the ligature rna:

- 𑒮୍ (s) + 𑒢 (na) gives the ligature sna:

- 𑒞୍ (t) + 𑒢 (na) gives the ligature tna:

== Comparison of Na ==
The various Indic scripts are generally related to each other through adaptation and borrowing, and as such the glyphs for cognate letters, including Na, are related as well.

Comparison of Na in different scripts

Aramaic
Kharoṣṭhī 𐨣	Ashoka Brahmi	Kushana Brahmi (Note: The middle "Kushana" form of Brahmi is a later style that emerged as Brahmi scripts were beginning to proliferate. Gupta Brahmi was definitely a stylistic descendant from Kushana, but other Brahmi-derived scripts may have descended from earlier forms.)	Tocharian (Note: Tocharian is probably derived from the middle period "Kushana" form of Brahmi, although artifacts from that time are not plentiful enough to establish a definite succession.) /
Gupta Brahmi	Pallava
Kadamba -
Bhaiksuki 𑰡	Siddhaṃ	Grantha 𑌨	Cham ꨘ
Sinhala න	Pyu / Old Mon (Note: Pyu and Old Mon are probably the precursors of the Burmese script, and may be derived from either the Pallava or Kadamba script) -
Tibetan	Newa 𑐣	Ahom 𑜃	Malayalam ന
Telugu న	Burmese န
Lepcha ᰍ	Ranjana	Saurashtra ꢥ	Dives Akuru 𑤟
Kannada ನ	Kayah Li ꤔ
Limbu ᤏ	Soyombo (Note: May also be derived from Devangari (see bottom left of table)) 𑩯	Khmer ន	Tamil
Chakma 𑄚	Tai Tham ᨶ
Meitei Mayek ꯅ	Gaudi -	Thai น	Lao ນ / ໜ
Tai Le ᥢ
Marchen 𑱽	Tirhuta 𑒢	New Tai Lue ᦓ / ᦐ	Tai Viet ꪙ / ꪘ	Aksara Kawi
'Phags-pa ꡋ	Odia ନ	Sharada 𑆤	Rejang ꤵ	Batak ᯉ	Buginese ᨊ
Zanabazar Square 𑨝	Bengali–Assamese	Takri 𑚝	Javanese ꦤ	Balinese ᬦ	Makasar 𑻨
Hangul (Note: The Origin of Hangul from 'Phags-pa is one of limited influence, inspiring at most a few basic letter shapes. Hangul does not function as an Indic abugida.) -	Northern Nagari -	Dogri 𑠝	Laṇḍā -	Sundanese ᮔ	Baybayin ᜈ
Modi 𑘡	Gujarati ન	Khojki 𑈞	Khudabadi 𑋑	Mahajani 𑅧	Tagbanwa ᝨ
Devanagari	Nandinagari 𑧁	Kaithi	Gurmukhi ਨ	Multani 𑊚	Buhid ᝈ
Canadian Syllabics (Note: Although the basic letter forms of the Canadian Aboriginal Syllabics were derived from handwritten Devanagari letters, this abugida indicates vowel sounds by rotations of the letter form, rather than the use of vowel diacritics as is standard in Indic abugidas.) ᓀ	Soyombo (Note: May also be derived from Ranjana (see above)) 𑩯	Sylheti Nagari ꠘ	Gunjala Gondi 𑵺	Masaram Gondi (Note: Masaram Gondi acts as an Indic abugida, but its letterforms were not derived from any single precursor script.) 𑴟	Hanuno'o ᜨ

== Character encodings of Na ==
Most Indic scripts are encoded in the Unicode Standard, and as such the letter Na in those scripts can be represented in plain text with unique codepoint. Na from several modern-use scripts can also be found in legacy encodings, such as ISCII.

Character information
Preview							న		ନ		ನ		ന		ન		ਨ	
Unicode name	DEVANAGARI LETTER NA		BENGALI LETTER NA		TAMIL LETTER NA		TELUGU LETTER NA		ORIYA LETTER NA		KANNADA LETTER NA		MALAYALAM LETTER NA		GUJARATI LETTER NA		GURMUKHI LETTER NA	
Encodings	decimal	hex	dec	hex	dec	hex	dec	hex	dec	hex	dec	hex	dec	hex	dec	hex	dec	hex
Unicode	2344	U+0928	2472	U+09A8	2984	U+0BA8	3112	U+0C28	2856	U+0B28	3240	U+0CA8	3368	U+0D28	2728	U+0AA8	2600	U+0A28
UTF-8	224 164 168	E0 A4 A8	224 166 168	E0 A6 A8	224 174 168	E0 AE A8	224 176 168	E0 B0 A8	224 172 168	E0 AC A8	224 178 168	E0 B2 A8	224 180 168	E0 B4 A8	224 170 168	E0 AA A8	224 168 168	E0 A8 A8
Numeric character reference	&#2344;	&#x928;	&#2472;	&#x9A8;	&#2984;	&#xBA8;	&#3112;	&#xC28;	&#2856;	&#xB28;	&#3240;	&#xCA8;	&#3368;	&#xD28;	&#2728;	&#xAA8;	&#2600;	&#xA28;
ISCII	198	C6	198	C6	198	C6	198	C6	198	C6	198	C6	198	C6	198	C6	198	C6

Character information
Preview	Ashoka Kushana Gupta		𐨣				𑌨	
Unicode name	BRAHMI LETTER NA		KHAROSHTHI LETTER NA		SIDDHAM LETTER NA		GRANTHA LETTER NA	
Encodings	decimal	hex	dec	hex	dec	hex	dec	hex
Unicode	69670	U+11026	68131	U+10A23	71073	U+115A1	70440	U+11328
UTF-8	240 145 128 166	F0 91 80 A6	240 144 168 163	F0 90 A8 A3	240 145 150 161	F0 91 96 A1	240 145 140 168	F0 91 8C A8
UTF-16	55300 56358	D804 DC26	55298 56867	D802 DE23	55301 56737	D805 DDA1	55300 57128	D804 DF28
Numeric character reference	&#69670;	&#x11026;	&#68131;	&#x10A23;	&#71073;	&#x115A1;	&#70440;	&#x11328;

Character information
Preview			ྣ		ꡋ		𑨝		𑐣		𑰡		𑆤	
Unicode name	TIBETAN LETTER NA		TIBETAN SUBJOINED LETTER NA		PHAGS-PA LETTER NA		ZANABAZAR SQUARE LETTER NA		NEWA LETTER NA		BHAIKSUKI LETTER NA		SHARADA LETTER NA	
Encodings	decimal	hex	dec	hex	dec	hex	dec	hex	dec	hex	dec	hex	dec	hex
Unicode	3923	U+0F53	4003	U+0FA3	43083	U+A84B	72221	U+11A1D	70691	U+11423	72737	U+11C21	70052	U+111A4
UTF-8	224 189 147	E0 BD 93	224 190 163	E0 BE A3	234 161 139	EA A1 8B	240 145 168 157	F0 91 A8 9D	240 145 144 163	F0 91 90 A3	240 145 176 161	F0 91 B0 A1	240 145 134 164	F0 91 86 A4
UTF-16	3923	0F53	4003	0FA3	43083	A84B	55302 56861	D806 DE1D	55301 56355	D805 DC23	55303 56353	D807 DC21	55300 56740	D804 DDA4
Numeric character reference	&#3923;	&#xF53;	&#4003;	&#xFA3;	&#43083;	&#xA84B;	&#72221;	&#x11A1D;	&#70691;	&#x11423;	&#72737;	&#x11C21;	&#70052;	&#x111A4;

Character information
Preview	န		ᨶ		ᦓ		ᦐ		ᧃ	
Unicode name	MYANMAR LETTER NA		TAI THAM LETTER NA		NEW TAI LUE LETTER LOW NA		NEW TAI LUE LETTER HIGH NA		NEW TAI LUE LETTER FINAL N	
Encodings	decimal	hex	dec	hex	dec	hex	dec	hex	dec	hex
Unicode	4116	U+1014	6710	U+1A36	6547	U+1993	6544	U+1990	6595	U+19C3
UTF-8	225 128 148	E1 80 94	225 168 182	E1 A8 B6	225 166 147	E1 A6 93	225 166 144	E1 A6 90	225 167 131	E1 A7 83
Numeric character reference	&#4116;	&#x1014;	&#6710;	&#x1A36;	&#6547;	&#x1993;	&#6544;	&#x1990;	&#6595;	&#x19C3;

Character information
Preview	ន		ນ		ໜ		น		ꪙ		ꪘ	
Unicode name	KHMER LETTER NO		LAO LETTER NO		LAO HO NO		THAI CHARACTER NO NU		TAI VIET LETTER HIGH NO		TAI VIET LETTER LOW NO	
Encodings	decimal	hex	dec	hex	dec	hex	dec	hex	dec	hex	dec	hex
Unicode	6035	U+1793	3737	U+0E99	3804	U+0EDC	3609	U+0E19	43673	U+AA99	43672	U+AA98
UTF-8	225 158 147	E1 9E 93	224 186 153	E0 BA 99	224 187 156	E0 BB 9C	224 184 153	E0 B8 99	234 170 153	EA AA 99	234 170 152	EA AA 98
Numeric character reference	&#6035;	&#x1793;	&#3737;	&#xE99;	&#3804;	&#xEDC;	&#3609;	&#xE19;	&#43673;	&#xAA99;	&#43672;	&#xAA98;

Character information
Preview	න		ꤔ		𑄚		ᥢ		𑜃		𑤟		ꢥ		ꨘ	
Unicode name	SINHALA LETTER DANTAJA NAYANNA		KAYAH LI LETTER NA		CHAKMA LETTER NAA		TAI LE LETTER NA		AHOM LETTER NA		DIVES AKURU LETTER NA		SAURASHTRA LETTER NA		CHAM LETTER NA	
Encodings	decimal	hex	dec	hex	dec	hex	dec	hex	dec	hex	dec	hex	dec	hex	dec	hex
Unicode	3505	U+0DB1	43284	U+A914	69914	U+1111A	6498	U+1962	71427	U+11703	71967	U+1191F	43173	U+A8A5	43544	U+AA18
UTF-8	224 182 177	E0 B6 B1	234 164 148	EA A4 94	240 145 132 154	F0 91 84 9A	225 165 162	E1 A5 A2	240 145 156 131	F0 91 9C 83	240 145 164 159	F0 91 A4 9F	234 162 165	EA A2 A5	234 168 152	EA A8 98
UTF-16	3505	0DB1	43284	A914	55300 56602	D804 DD1A	6498	1962	55301 57091	D805 DF03	55302 56607	D806 DD1F	43173	A8A5	43544	AA18
Numeric character reference	&#3505;	&#xDB1;	&#43284;	&#xA914;	&#69914;	&#x1111A;	&#6498;	&#x1962;	&#71427;	&#x11703;	&#71967;	&#x1191F;	&#43173;	&#xA8A5;	&#43544;	&#xAA18;

Character information
Preview	𑘡		𑧁		𑩯		ꠘ		𑵺			
Unicode name	MODI LETTER NA		NANDINAGARI LETTER NA		SOYOMBO LETTER NA		SYLOTI NAGRI LETTER NO		GUNJALA GONDI LETTER NA		KAITHI LETTER NA	
Encodings	decimal	hex	dec	hex	dec	hex	dec	hex	dec	hex	dec	hex
Unicode	71201	U+11621	72129	U+119C1	72303	U+11A6F	43032	U+A818	73082	U+11D7A	69794	U+110A2
UTF-8	240 145 152 161	F0 91 98 A1	240 145 167 129	F0 91 A7 81	240 145 169 175	F0 91 A9 AF	234 160 152	EA A0 98	240 145 181 186	F0 91 B5 BA	240 145 130 162	F0 91 82 A2
UTF-16	55301 56865	D805 DE21	55302 56769	D806 DDC1	55302 56943	D806 DE6F	43032	A818	55303 56698	D807 DD7A	55300 56482	D804 DCA2
Numeric character reference	&#71201;	&#x11621;	&#72129;	&#x119C1;	&#72303;	&#x11A6F;	&#43032;	&#xA818;	&#73082;	&#x11D7A;	&#69794;	&#x110A2;

Character information
Preview	𑒢		ᰍ		ᤏ		ꯅ		𑱽	
Unicode name	TIRHUTA LETTER NA		LEPCHA LETTER NA		LIMBU LETTER NA		MEETEI MAYEK LETTER NA		MARCHEN LETTER NA	
Encodings	decimal	hex	dec	hex	dec	hex	dec	hex	dec	hex
Unicode	70818	U+114A2	7181	U+1C0D	6415	U+190F	43973	U+ABC5	72829	U+11C7D
UTF-8	240 145 146 162	F0 91 92 A2	225 176 141	E1 B0 8D	225 164 143	E1 A4 8F	234 175 133	EA AF 85	240 145 177 189	F0 91 B1 BD
UTF-16	55301 56482	D805 DCA2	7181	1C0D	6415	190F	43973	ABC5	55303 56445	D807 DC7D
Numeric character reference	&#70818;	&#x114A2;	&#7181;	&#x1C0D;	&#6415;	&#x190F;	&#43973;	&#xABC5;	&#72829;	&#x11C7D;

Character information
Preview	𑚝		𑠝		𑈞		𑋑		𑅧		𑊚	
Unicode name	TAKRI LETTER NA		DOGRA LETTER NA		KHOJKI LETTER NA		KHUDAWADI LETTER NA		MAHAJANI LETTER NA		MULTANI LETTER NA	
Encodings	decimal	hex	dec	hex	dec	hex	dec	hex	dec	hex	dec	hex
Unicode	71325	U+1169D	71709	U+1181D	70174	U+1121E	70353	U+112D1	69991	U+11167	70298	U+1129A
UTF-8	240 145 154 157	F0 91 9A 9D	240 145 160 157	F0 91 A0 9D	240 145 136 158	F0 91 88 9E	240 145 139 145	F0 91 8B 91	240 145 133 167	F0 91 85 A7	240 145 138 154	F0 91 8A 9A
UTF-16	55301 56989	D805 DE9D	55302 56349	D806 DC1D	55300 56862	D804 DE1E	55300 57041	D804 DED1	55300 56679	D804 DD67	55300 56986	D804 DE9A
Numeric character reference	&#71325;	&#x1169D;	&#71709;	&#x1181D;	&#70174;	&#x1121E;	&#70353;	&#x112D1;	&#69991;	&#x11167;	&#70298;	&#x1129A;

Character information
Preview	ᬦ		ᯉ		ᨊ		ꦤ		𑻨		ꤵ		ᮔ	
Unicode name	BALINESE LETTER NA		BATAK LETTER NA		BUGINESE LETTER NA		JAVANESE LETTER NA		MAKASAR LETTER NA		REJANG LETTER NA		SUNDANESE LETTER NA	
Encodings	decimal	hex	dec	hex	dec	hex	dec	hex	dec	hex	dec	hex	dec	hex
Unicode	6950	U+1B26	7113	U+1BC9	6666	U+1A0A	43428	U+A9A4	73448	U+11EE8	43317	U+A935	7060	U+1B94
UTF-8	225 172 166	E1 AC A6	225 175 137	E1 AF 89	225 168 138	E1 A8 8A	234 166 164	EA A6 A4	240 145 187 168	F0 91 BB A8	234 164 181	EA A4 B5	225 174 148	E1 AE 94
UTF-16	6950	1B26	7113	1BC9	6666	1A0A	43428	A9A4	55303 57064	D807 DEE8	43317	A935	7060	1B94
Numeric character reference	&#6950;	&#x1B26;	&#7113;	&#x1BC9;	&#6666;	&#x1A0A;	&#43428;	&#xA9A4;	&#73448;	&#x11EE8;	&#43317;	&#xA935;	&#7060;	&#x1B94;

Character information
Preview	ᜈ		ᝨ		ᝈ		ᜨ		𑴟	
Unicode name	TAGALOG LETTER NA		TAGBANWA LETTER NA		BUHID LETTER NA		HANUNOO LETTER NA		MASARAM GONDI LETTER NA	
Encodings	decimal	hex	dec	hex	dec	hex	dec	hex	dec	hex
Unicode	5896	U+1708	5992	U+1768	5960	U+1748	5928	U+1728	72991	U+11D1F
UTF-8	225 156 136	E1 9C 88	225 157 168	E1 9D A8	225 157 136	E1 9D 88	225 156 168	E1 9C A8	240 145 180 159	F0 91 B4 9F
UTF-16	5896	1708	5992	1768	5960	1748	5928	1728	55303 56607	D807 DD1F
Numeric character reference	&#5896;	&#x1708;	&#5992;	&#x1768;	&#5960;	&#x1748;	&#5928;	&#x1728;	&#72991;	&#x11D1F;

Character information
Preview	ᓀ		ᓂ		ᓄ		ᓇ		ᓐ	
Unicode name	CANADIAN SYLLABICS NE		CANADIAN SYLLABICS NI		CANADIAN SYLLABICS NO		CANADIAN SYLLABICS NA		CANADIAN SYLLABICS N	
Encodings	decimal	hex	dec	hex	dec	hex	dec	hex	dec	hex
Unicode	5312	U+14C0	5314	U+14C2	5316	U+14C4	5319	U+14C7	5328	U+14D0
UTF-8	225 147 128	E1 93 80	225 147 130	E1 93 82	225 147 132	E1 93 84	225 147 135	E1 93 87	225 147 144	E1 93 90
Numeric character reference	&#5312;	&#x14C0;	&#5314;	&#x14C2;	&#5316;	&#x14C4;	&#5319;	&#x14C7;	&#5328;	&#x14D0;

- The full range of NE Canadian syllabic characters can be found at the codepoint ranges 14C0-14D0, 14D2, 158E-1596, 159B-159F, 1602-1607, 1670-1676, 18BB-18BC, 18C6-18CD, & 18D9.
