= Galik alphabet =

Extension to the traditional Mongolian script

Galik Ali Gali
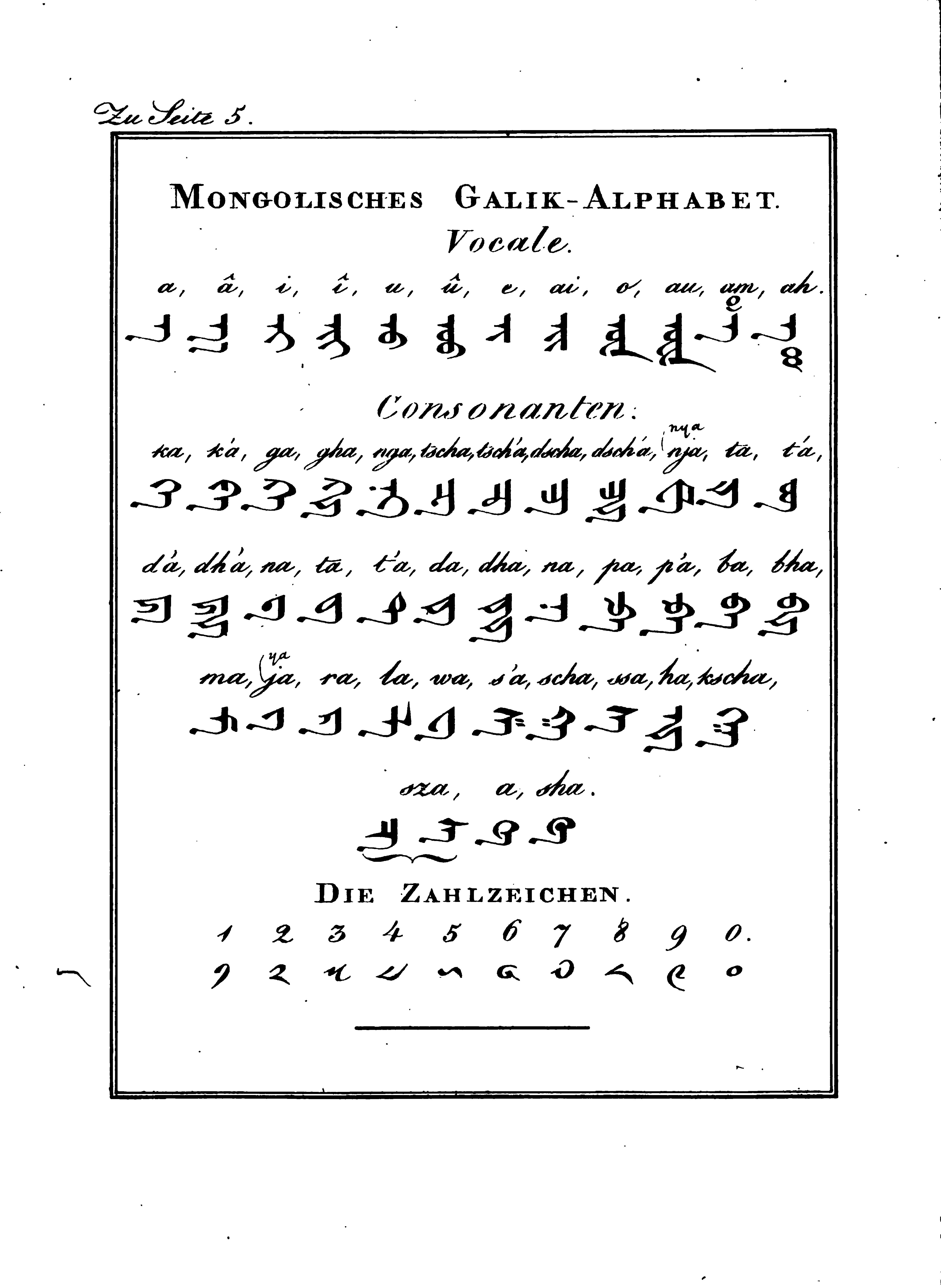
- Script type: Alphabet
- Creator: Ayuush Güüsh
- Period: 16th century
- Languages: Mongolian, Tibetan, Sanskrit

Related scripts
- Parent systems: Proto-Sinaitic alphabet: Phoenician alphabet; Aramaic alphabet; Syriac alphabet; Sogdian alphabet; Old Uyghur alphabet; Mongolian script; Galik
- Sister systems: Clear script Vagindra script

Twenty-One Hymns to the Rescuer Mother of Buddhas in four scripts: Tibetan, Manchu, Galik Mongolian, and Chinese

The Galik script (Mongolian: Али-гали үсэг, Ali-gali üseg) is an extension to the traditional Mongolian script. It was created in 1587 by the translator and scholar Ayuush Güüsh (Mongolian: Аюуш гүүш), inspired by the third Dalai Lama, Sonam Gyatso. He added extra characters for transcribing Tibetan and Sanskrit terms when translating religious texts, and later also from Chinese. Some of those characters are still in use today for writing foreign names.

Some authors (particularly historic ones like Isaac Taylor in his The Alphabet: an account of the origin and development of letters, 1883) don't distinguish between the Galik and standard Mongolian alphabets.

== Rendering ==
Reference image	Browser-rendered text	Transliteration
	ᠾᠠ᠋᠎ᠠ	ha‑a

== Letters ==
The order of the letters corresponds to the alphabetic order of Sanskrit.

Vowels
Mongolian script (Note: Scholarly/Scientific transliteration.)	Devanagari script	IAST	Tibetan script	Wylie (EWTS) (Note: THL Extended Wylie Transliteration Scheme – THL Extended Wylie Transliteration Scheme | Mandala Collections - Texts)
ᠠ᠋ a	अ	a	ཨ	a
ᠠ᠋᠎ᠠ a‑a (Note: For correct rendering, this should appear as a short tooth (ᠡ‍) + one connected, and one separated left-pointing tail (both).)	आ / ा	ā	ཨཱ	A
ᠢ i	इ / ि	i	ཨི	i
ᠢᠢ ii	ई / ी	ī	ཨཱི	I
⟨ᠦ᠋⟩	उ / ु	u	ཨུ	u
⟨ᠤᠦ⟩	ऊ / ू	ū	ཨཱུ	U
ᠷᠢ ri	ऋ / ृ	ṛ	རྀ	r-i
ᠷᠢᠢ rii	ॠ / ॄ	ṝ	རཱྀ	r-I
ᠯᠢ li	ऌ / ॢ	ḷ	ལྀ	l-i
ᠯᠢᠢ lii	ॡ / ॣ	ḹ	ལཱྀ	l-I
ᠧ ē/é	ए / े	e	ཨེ	e
ᠧᠧ ēē/éé	ऐ / ै	ai	ཨཻ	ai
⟨ᠣᠸᠠ⟩	ओ / ो	o	ཨོ	o
⟨ᠣᠸᠸᠠ⟩ (Note: For correct rendering, this should appear as a short tooth (ᠡ‍) + loop (‍ᠤ‍) + two long teeth with downturns (‍ᠧ‍) + a final with right-pointing tail (‍ᠡ).)	औ / ौ	au	ཨཽ	au
ᢀ᠋ᠠ᠋	अं	aṃ	ཨཾ	aM
ᠠ᠋ᢁ	अः	aḥ	ཨཿ	aH

Consonants
Mongolian script (Note: For correct rendering, all these final a's should appear as connected and left-pointing tails. A's directly preceded by any of the bow-shaped letters k, kh, g, p, ph, and b should also include a tooth in between.)	Devanagari	IAST	Tibetan	Wylie (EWTS)
ᢉᠠ	क	ka	ཀ	ka
ᢉᠠ / ᠻᠠ ka/kha	ख	kha	ཁ	kha
ᠺᠠ ga/ka	ग	ga	ག	ga
ᠺᠾᠠ᠋ gha/kha	घ	gha	གྷ	g+ha
⟨ᠡᠭᠡ⟩ / ᢊᠠ᠋ / ᢊᢇ	ङ	ṅa	ང	nga
ᡔᠠ᠋ / ᠴᠠ᠋	—	—	ཅ	ca
ᡓᠠ᠋ / ᢋᠠ᠋ / ᢖᠠ᠋ / ᠽᠠ᠋	च	ca	ཙ	tsa
ᠴᠠ᠋ ča	—	—	ཆ	cha
ᠼᠠ᠋ ca	छ	cha	ཚ	tsha
ᡔᠠ᠋ / ᢋᠠ᠋	—	—	ཇ	ja
⟨ᢋᠠ᠋ ~ ᢖᠠ᠋⟩^{?} / ᠽᠠ᠋	ज	ja	ཛ	dza
⟨ᢋᠾᠠ᠋ ~ ᢖᠾᠠ᠋⟩^{?} / ᠽᠾᠠ᠋	झ	jha	ཛྷ	dz+ha
ᡛᠠ᠋	ञ	ña	ཉ	nya
ᢌᠠ᠋	ट	ṭa	ཊ	Ta
⟨ᡂᠠ᠋⟩ / ᢍᠠ᠋	ठ	ṭha	ཋ	Tha
ᢎᠠ᠋	ड	ḍa	ཌ	Da
ᢎᠾᠠ᠋	ढ	ḍha	ཌྷ	D+ha
ᢏᠠ᠋	ण	ṇa	ཎ	Na
⟨ᠳ᠋ᠠ᠋⟩ / ᢐᠠ᠋	त	ta	ཏ	ta
ᠲᠠ᠋ ta	थ	tha	ཐ	tha
ᠳ᠋ᠠ᠋ da / ᢑᠠ᠋	द	da	ད	da
ᠳ᠋ᠾᠠ᠋ dha / ᢑᠾᠠ᠋	ध	dha	དྷ	d+ha
ᠨ᠋ᠠ᠋/ᠨᠠ᠋ na	न	na	ན	na
ᢒᠠ	प	pa	པ	pa
ᠪᠠ ba / ᠹᠠ fa / ᢓᠠ	फ	pha	ཕ	pha
ᠪᠠ ba	ब	ba	བ	ba
ᠪᠾᠠ᠋ bha	भ	bha	བྷ	b+ha
ᠮᠠ᠋ ma	म	ma	མ	ma
ᠶ᠋ᠠ᠋/ᠶᠠ᠋ ya	य	ya	ཡ	ya
ᠷᠠ᠋ ra	र	ra	ར	ra
ᠯᠠ᠋ la	ल	la	ལ	la
ᡀᠠ᠋ lha	—	—	ལྷ	lha
ᠸᠠ᠋ wa/va	व	va	ཝ	wa
ᢕᠠ᠋	—	—	ཞ	zha
⟨ᠰ᠋ᠠ᠋⟩ / ᠱᠠ᠋ ša	श	śa	ཤ	sha
ᢔᠠ᠋	ष	ṣa	ཥ	Sha
ᠰᠠ᠋ sa	स	sa	ས	sa
ᠾᠠ᠋ ha	ह	ha	ཧ	ha
ᢖᠠ᠋^{?} / ⟨ᢋᠠ᠋ ~ ᢖᠠ᠋⟩^{?}	—	—	ཟ	za
ᢗᠠ᠋	—	—	འ	'a
ᢉᢔᠠ᠋	क्ष	kṣa	ཀྵ	k+Sha

== Symbols and diacritics ==
Symbols and diacritics
Forms	Name	Examples	
Forms	Name	Mongolian	Tibetan equivalent
ᢀ	Anusvara One	ᢀᠠ᠋	ཨྃ
ᢀ᠋	Anusvara One	ᢀᠠ᠋	ཨྃ
ᢁ	Visarga One	ᠠ᠋ᢁ	ཨཿ
ᢁ᠋	Visarga One	ᠠ᠋ᢁ	ཨཿ
ᢂ	Damaru	ᢂᠻᠠ	ྈྑ
ᢃ	Ubadama	ᢃᠹᠠ	ྌྥ
ᢄ	Ubadama	ᢄᠹᠠ	ྉྥ
ᢅ	Baluda	ᢉᢅᠣᠸᠸᠠ (Note: For correct rendering, this should appear as a right-side diacritic.)	ཀཽ྅
ᢆ	Three Baluda	ᢉᢆᠣᠸᠸᠠ (Note: For correct rendering, this should appear as a right-side diacritic.)	ཀཽ྅྅྅

== See also ==
- Mongolian transliteration of Chinese characters
  - Sino–Mongolian Transliterations
