= Mac OS Devanagari encoding =

Apple computer text character encoding

Mac OS Devanagari
- Alias(es): x-mac-devanagari
- Created by: Apple, Inc
- Classification: Extended ASCII, Mac OS script
- Extends: US-ASCII
- Based on: ISCII

Mac OS Devanagari is a character set developed by Apple Inc.. It is an extension the Devanagari portion of IS 13194:1991 (ISCII-91), but it does not support the other scripts of ISCII.

== Character set ==
Mac Devanagari
	0	1	2	3	4	5	6	7	8	9	A	B	C	D	E	F
8x	×	−	–	—	‘	’	…	•	©	®	™					
9x	॥	॰														
Ax		ँ	ं	ः	अ	आ	इ	ई	उ	ऊ	ऋ	ऎ	ए	ऐ	ऍ	ऒ
Bx	ओ	औ	ऑ	क	ख	ग	घ	ङ	च	छ	ज	झ	ञ	ट	ठ	ड
Cx	ढ	ण	त	थ	द	ध	न	ऩ	प	फ	ब	भ	म	य	य़	र
Dx	ऱ	ल	ळ	ऴ	व	श	ष	स	ह	INV	ा	ि	ी	ु	ू	ृ
Ex	ॆ	े	ै	ॅ	ॊ	ो	ौ	ॉ	्	़	।					
Fx		०	१	२	३	४	५	६	७	८	९					

Byte pairs and ISCII-related features are described in the mapping file. For more information on the INV character, see Indian Script Code for Information Interchange § Special code points.
