= Ai (Indic) =

Letter "Ai" in Indic scripts

Example glyphs
- Bengali–Assamese: ঐ
- Tibetan: ཨཻ
- Tamil: ஐ
- Thai: ไ
- Malayalam: ഐ
- Sinhala: ඓ
- Ashoka Brahmi: Ai
- Devanagari: ऐ

Cognates
- Hebrew: ע
- Greek: Ο, Ω
- Latin: O
- Cyrillic: О, Ѡ, Ѿ, Ꙋ, Ю

Properties
- Phonemic representation: /ɐi/ /ɔi/ /ɛː/
- IAST transliteration: ai Ai
- ISCII code point: AD (173)

Ai is a vowel of Indic abugidas. In modern Indic scripts, Ai is derived from the early "Ashoka" Brahmi letter. As an Indic vowel, Ai comes in two normally distinct forms: 1) as an independent letter, and 2) as a vowel sign for modifying a base consonant. Bare consonants without a modifying vowel sign have the inherent "A" vowel.

== Āryabhaṭa numeration ==
Aryabhata used Devanagari letters for numbers, very similar to the Greek numerals, even after the invention of Indian numerals. The ै sign was used to modify a consonant's value ×10^{12}, but the vowel letter ऐ did not have an inherent value by itself.

== Historic Ai ==
There are three different general early historic scripts - Brahmi and its variants, Kharoṣṭhī, and Tocharian, the so-called slanting Brahmi. Ai as found in standard Brahmi, was a simple geometric shape, and retained the same basic form into later styles of Brahmi. Like all Brahmic scripts, Tocharian Ai has an accompanying vowel mark for modifying a base consonant. In Kharoṣṭhī, the only independent vowel letter is for the inherent A. All other independent vowels, including Ai are indicated with vowel marks added to the letter A.

=== Brahmi Ai ===
The Brahmi letter Ai, is probably derived from the altered Aramaic Ayin, and is thus related to the modern Latin O and Greek Omicron. Several identifiable styles of writing the Brahmi Ai can be found, most associated with a specific set of inscriptions from an artifact or diverse records from an historic period. As the earliest and most geometric style of Brahmi, the letters found on the Edicts of Ashoka and other records from around that time are normally the reference form for Brahmi letters, with some vowel marks not attested until later forms of Brahmi back-formed to match the geometric writing style.

Brahmi Ai historic forms
Ashoka (3rd-1st c. BCE)	Girnar (~150 BCE)	Kushana (~150-250 CE)	Gujarat (~250 CE)	Gupta (~350 CE)

=== Tocharian Ai ===
The Tocharian letter is derived from the Brahmi. Unlike some of the consonants, Tocharian vowels do not have a Fremdzeichen form.

Tocharian consonants with Ai vowel marks
Kai	Khai	Gai	Ghai	Cai	Chai	Jai	Jhai	Nyai	Ṭai	Ṭhai	Ḍai	Ḍhai	Ṇai
Tai	Thai	Dai	Dhai	Nai	Pai	Phai	Bai	Bhai	Mai	Yai	Rai	Lai	Vai
Śai	Ṣai	Sai	Hai										

=== Kharoṣṭhī Ai ===
The Kharoṣṭhī letter Ai is indicated with the E vowel mark plus the vowel length mark. As an independent vowel, Ai is indicated by adding the vowel marks to the independent vowel letter A.

== Devanagari Ai ==
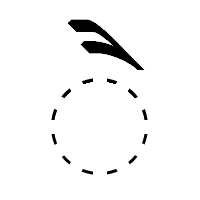
Devanagari independent Ai and Ai vowel sign.

Ai (ऐ) is a vowel of the Devanagari abugida. It ultimately arose from the Brahmi letter. Letters that derive from it are the Gujarati letter ઐ, and the Modi letter 𑘋.

=== Devanagari Using Languages ===
The Devanagari script is used to write the Hindi language, Sanskrit and the majority of Indo-Aryan languages. In most of these languages, ऐ is pronounced as [æ]. Like all Indic scripts, Devanagari vowels come in two forms: an independent vowel form for syllables that begin with a vowel sound, and a vowel sign attached to base consonant to override the inherent /ə/ vowel.

== Bengali Ai ==
Bengali independent Ai and Ai vowel sign.

Ai (ঐ) is a vowel of the Bengali abugida. It is derived from the Siddhaṃ letter, and is marked by the lack of horizontal head line and less geometric shape than its Devanagari counterpart, ऐ.

=== Bengali Script Using Languages ===
The Bengali script is used to write several languages of eastern India, notably the Bengali language and Assamese. In most languages, ঐ is pronounced as [oi]. Like all Indic scripts, Bengali vowels come in two forms: an independent vowel form for syllables that begin with a vowel sound, and a vowel sign attached to base consonant to override the inherent /ɔ/ vowel.

== Gujarati Ai ==
Gujarati independent Ai and Ai vowel sign.

Ai (ઐ) is a vowel of the Gujarati abugida. It is derived from the Devanagari Ai, and ultimately the Brahmi letter.

=== Gujarati-using Languages ===
The Gujarati script is used to write the Gujarati and Kutchi languages. In both languages, ઐ is pronounced as [ai]. Like all Indic scripts, Gujarati vowels come in two forms: an independent vowel form for syllables that begin with a vowel sound, and a vowel sign attached to base consonant to override the inherent /ə/ vowel.

== Telugu Ai ==
Telugu independent vowel and vowel sign Ai.

Ai (ఐ) is a vowel of the Telugu abugida. It ultimately arose from the Brahmi letter. It is closely related to the Kannada letter ಐ. Like in other Indic scripts, Telugu vowels have two forms: and independent letter for word and syllable-initial vowel sounds, and a vowel sign for changing the inherent "a" of Telugu consonant letters. Vowel signs in Telugu can interact with a base consonant in one of three ways: 1) the vowel sign touches or sits adjacent to the base consonant without modifying the shape of either 2) the vowel sign sits directly above the consonant, replacing its v-shaped headline, 3) the vowel sign and consonant interact, forming a ligature.

Telugu Ai vowel sign on క, ఖ, గ, ఘ & ఙ: Kai, Khai, Gai, Ghai and Ngai. Note that how the vowel sign interacts with the base consonant is dependent on the location of the headline, the absence of a headline, and the presence of a tail to attach to.

== Malayalam Ai ==
Malayalam independent vowel and vowel sign Ai.

Ai (ഐ) is a vowel of the Malayalam abugida. It ultimately arose from the Brahmi letter, via the Grantha letter ai. Like in other Indic scripts, Malayalam vowels have two forms: an independent letter for word and syllable-initial vowel sounds, and a vowel sign for changing the inherent "a" of consonant letters. Vowel signs in Malayalam usually sit adjacent to its base consonant - below, to the left, right, or both left and right, but are always pronounced after the consonant sound.

== Odia Ai ==
Odia independent vowel and vowel sign Ai

Ai (ଐ) is a vowel of the Odia abugida. It ultimately arose from the Brahmi letter, via the Siddhaṃ letter ai. Like in other Indic scripts, Odia vowels have two forms: an independent letter for word and syllable-initial vowel sounds, and a vowel sign for changing the inherent "a" of consonant letters. Vowel signs in Odia usually sit adjacent to its base consonant - below, to the left, right, or both left and right, but are always pronounced after the consonant sound. No base consonants are altered in form when adding a vowel sign, and there are no consonant+vowel ligatures in Odia.

== Kaithi Ai ==
Kaithi independent vowel and vowel sign Ai.

Ai (𑂊) is a vowel of the Kaithi abugida. It ultimately arose from the Brahmi letter, via the Siddhaṃ letter Ai. Like in other Indic scripts, Kaithi vowels have two forms: an independent letter for word and syllable-initial vowel sounds, and a vowel sign for changing the inherent "a" of consonant letters. Vowel signs in Kaithi usually sit adjacent to its base consonant - below, to the left, right, or both left and right, but are always pronounced after the consonant sound. No base consonants are altered in form when adding a vowel sign, and there are no consonant+vowel ligatures in Kaithi.

== Tirhuta Ai ==
Tirhuta independent vowel and vowel sign Ai.

Ai (𑒌) is a vowel of the Tirhuta abugida. It ultimately arose from the Brahmi letter, via the Siddhaṃ letter Ai. Like in other Indic scripts, Tirhuta vowels have two forms: an independent letter for word and syllable-initial vowel sounds, and a vowel sign for changing the inherent "a" of consonant letters. Vowel signs in Tirhuta usually sit adjacent to its base consonant - below, to the left, right, or both left and right, but are always pronounced after the consonant sound. No consonants are altered in form when adding the Ai vowel mark, although there are some consonant+vowel ligatures in Tirhuta.

== Comparison of Ai ==
The various Indic scripts are generally related to each other through adaptation and borrowing, and as such the glyphs for cognate letters, including Ai, are related as well.

Comparison of Ai in different scripts

Aramaic
Kharoṣṭhī -	Ashoka Brahmi / 𑁃	Kushana Brahmi (Note: The middle "Kushana" form of Brahmi is a later style that emerged as Brahmi scripts were beginning to proliferate. Gupta Brahmi was definitely a stylistic descendant from Kushana, but other Brahmi-derived scripts may have descended from earlier forms.) 𑀐 / 𑁃	Tocharian (Note: Tocharian is probably derived from the middle period "Kushana" form of Brahmi, although artifacts from that time are not plentiful enough to establish a definite succession.)
Gupta Brahmi 𑀐 / 𑁃	Pallava
Kadamba -
Bhaiksuki 𑰋 / 𑰹	Siddhaṃ / 𑖹	Grantha 𑌐 / 𑍈	Cham ꨄ / ꨰ
Sinhala ඓ / ෛ	Pyu / Old Mon (Note: Pyu and Old Mon are probably the precursors of the Burmese script, and may be derived from either the Pallava or Kadamba script) -
Tibetan ཻ	Newa 𑐋 / 𑐿	Ahom -	Malayalam ഐ / ൈ
Telugu ఐ / ై	Burmese ဲ
Lepcha -	Ranjana	Saurashtra ꢎ / ꢿ	Dives Akuru 𑤷
Kannada ಐ / ೈ	Kayah Li -
Limbu ᤤ	Soyombo (Note: May also be derived from Devangari (see bottom left of table)) 𑩗	Khmer ឰ / ៃ	Tamil ஐ / ை
Chakma 𑄭	Tai Tham ᩱ / ᩲ
Meitei Mayek ꫭ / ꯩ	Gaudi -	Thai ไ / ใ	Lao ໄ / ໃ
Tai Le ᥭ
Marchen -	Tirhuta 𑒌 / 𑒻	New Tai Lue ᦶ	Tai Viet ꪼ	Aksara Kawi 𑼏 / 𑼿
'Phags-pa -	Odia ଐ / ୈ	Sharada 𑆎 / 𑆽	Rejang ꥊ	Batak -	Buginese ᨛ
Zanabazar Square -	Bengali–Assamese ঐ / ৈ	Takri 𑚇 / 𑚳	Javanese ꦍ / ꦻ	Balinese ᬐ / ᬿ	Makasar -
Hangul (Note: The Origin of Hangul from 'Phags-pa is one of limited influence, inspiring at most a few basic letter shapes. Hangul does not function as an Indic abugida.) -	Northern Nagari -	Dogri 𑠇 / 𑠴	Laṇḍā -	Sundanese ᮆ / ᮦ	Baybayin -
Modi 𑘋 / 𑘺	Gujarati ઐ / ૈ	Khojki 𑈅 / 𑈱	Khudabadi 𑊷 / 𑋦	Mahajani -	Tagbanwa -
Devanagari ऐ / ै	Nandinagari 𑦫 / 𑧛	Kaithi / 𑂶	Gurmukhi ਐ / ੈ	Multani -	Buhid -
Canadian Syllabics (Note: Although the basic letter forms of the Canadian Aboriginal Syllabics were derived from handwritten Devanagari letters, this abugida indicates vowel sounds by rotations of the letter form, rather than the use of vowel diacritics as is standard in Indic abugidas.) -	Soyombo (Note: May also be derived from Ranjana (see above)) 𑩗	Sylheti Nagari ꠧ	Gunjala Gondi 𑵨 / 𑶑	Masaram Gondi (Note: Masaram Gondi acts as an Indic abugida, but its letterforms were not derived from any single precursor script.) 𑴈 / 𑴼	Hanuno'o -

== Character encodings of Ai ==
Most Indic scripts are encoded in the Unicode Standard, and as such the letter Ai in those scripts can be represented in plain text with unique codepoint. Ai from several modern-use scripts can also be found in legacy encodings, such as ISCII.

Character information
Preview	ऐ		ঐ		ஐ		ఐ		ଐ		ಐ		ഐ		ઐ		ਐ	
Unicode name	DEVANAGARI LETTER AI		BENGALI LETTER AI		TAMIL LETTER AI		TELUGU LETTER AI		ORIYA LETTER AI		KANNADA LETTER AI		MALAYALAM LETTER AI		GUJARATI LETTER AI		GURMUKHI LETTER AI	
Encodings	decimal	hex	dec	hex	dec	hex	dec	hex	dec	hex	dec	hex	dec	hex	dec	hex	dec	hex
Unicode	2320	U+0910	2448	U+0990	2960	U+0B90	3088	U+0C10	2832	U+0B10	3216	U+0C90	3344	U+0D10	2704	U+0A90	2576	U+0A10
UTF-8	224 164 144	E0 A4 90	224 166 144	E0 A6 90	224 174 144	E0 AE 90	224 176 144	E0 B0 90	224 172 144	E0 AC 90	224 178 144	E0 B2 90	224 180 144	E0 B4 90	224 170 144	E0 AA 90	224 168 144	E0 A8 90
Numeric character reference	&#2320;	&#x910;	&#2448;	&#x990;	&#2960;	&#xB90;	&#3088;	&#xC10;	&#2832;	&#xB10;	&#3216;	&#xC90;	&#3344;	&#xD10;	&#2704;	&#xA90;	&#2576;	&#xA10;
ISCII	173	AD	173	AD	173	AD	173	AD	173	AD	173	AD	173	AD	173	AD	173	AD

Character information
Preview	Ashoka Kushana Gupta				𑌐	
Unicode name	BRAHMI LETTER AI		SIDDHAM LETTER AI		GRANTHA LETTER AI	
Encodings	decimal	hex	dec	hex	dec	hex
Unicode	69648	U+11010	71051	U+1158B	70416	U+11310
UTF-8	240 145 128 144	F0 91 80 90	240 145 150 139	F0 91 96 8B	240 145 140 144	F0 91 8C 90
UTF-16	55300 56336	D804 DC10	55301 56715	D805 DD8B	55300 57104	D804 DF10
Numeric character reference	&#69648;	&#x11010;	&#71051;	&#x1158B;	&#70416;	&#x11310;

Character information
Preview	𑆎	
Unicode name	SHARADA LETTER AI	
Encodings	decimal	hex
Unicode	70030	U+1118E
UTF-8	240 145 134 142	F0 91 86 8E
UTF-16	55300 56718	D804 DD8E
Numeric character reference	&#70030;	&#x1118E;

Character information
Preview	ᦶ	
Unicode name	NEW TAI LUE VOWEL SIGN AE	
Encodings	decimal	hex
Unicode	6582	U+19B6
UTF-8	225 166 182	E1 A6 B6
Numeric character reference	&#6582;	&#x19B6;

Character information
Preview	ឰ		ໄ		ໃ		ไ		ใ		ꪼ	
Unicode name	KHMER INDEPENDENT VOWEL QAI		LAO VOWEL SIGN AI		LAO VOWEL SIGN AY		THAI CHARACTER SARA AI MAIMALAI		THAI CHARACTER SARA AI MAIMUAN		TAI VIET VOWEL AY	
Encodings	decimal	hex	dec	hex	dec	hex	dec	hex	dec	hex	dec	hex
Unicode	6064	U+17B0	3780	U+0EC4	3779	U+0EC3	3652	U+0E44	3651	U+0E43	43708	U+AABC
UTF-8	225 158 176	E1 9E B0	224 187 132	E0 BB 84	224 187 131	E0 BB 83	224 185 132	E0 B9 84	224 185 131	E0 B9 83	234 170 188	EA AA BC
Numeric character reference	&#6064;	&#x17B0;	&#3780;	&#xEC4;	&#3779;	&#xEC3;	&#3652;	&#xE44;	&#3651;	&#xE43;	&#43708;	&#xAABC;

Character information
Preview	ඓ		ᥭ		ꢎ		ꨄ	
Unicode name	SINHALA LETTER AIYANNA		TAI LE LETTER AI		SAURASHTRA LETTER AI		CHAM LETTER AI	
Encodings	decimal	hex	dec	hex	dec	hex	dec	hex
Unicode	3475	U+0D93	6509	U+196D	43150	U+A88E	43524	U+AA04
UTF-8	224 182 147	E0 B6 93	225 165 173	E1 A5 AD	234 162 142	EA A2 8E	234 168 132	EA A8 84
Numeric character reference	&#3475;	&#xD93;	&#6509;	&#x196D;	&#43150;	&#xA88E;	&#43524;	&#xAA04;

Character information
Preview	𑘋			
Unicode name	MODI LETTER AI		KAITHI LETTER AI	
Encodings	decimal	hex	dec	hex
Unicode	71179	U+1160B	69770	U+1108A
UTF-8	240 145 152 139	F0 91 98 8B	240 145 130 138	F0 91 82 8A
UTF-16	55301 56843	D805 DE0B	55300 56458	D804 DC8A
Numeric character reference	&#71179;	&#x1160B;	&#69770;	&#x1108A;

Character information
Preview	𑒌		ᤤ	
Unicode name	TIRHUTA LETTER AI		LIMBU VOWEL SIGN AI	
Encodings	decimal	hex	dec	hex
Unicode	70796	U+1148C	6436	U+1924
UTF-8	240 145 146 140	F0 91 92 8C	225 164 164	E1 A4 A4
UTF-16	55301 56460	D805 DC8C	6436	1924
Numeric character reference	&#70796;	&#x1148C;	&#6436;	&#x1924;

Character information
Preview	𑚇		𑈅		𑊷	
Unicode name	TAKRI LETTER AI		KHOJKI LETTER AI		KHUDAWADI LETTER AI	
Encodings	decimal	hex	dec	hex	dec	hex
Unicode	71303	U+11687	70149	U+11205	70327	U+112B7
UTF-8	240 145 154 135	F0 91 9A 87	240 145 136 133	F0 91 88 85	240 145 138 183	F0 91 8A B7
UTF-16	55301 56967	D805 DE87	55300 56837	D804 DE05	55300 57015	D804 DEB7
Numeric character reference	&#71303;	&#x11687;	&#70149;	&#x11205;	&#70327;	&#x112B7;

Character information
Preview	ᬐ		ꦍ		ᮆ	
Unicode name	BALINESE LETTER AIKARA		JAVANESE LETTER AI		SUNDANESE LETTER AE	
Encodings	decimal	hex	dec	hex	dec	hex
Unicode	6928	U+1B10	43405	U+A98D	7046	U+1B86
UTF-8	225 172 144	E1 AC 90	234 166 141	EA A6 8D	225 174 134	E1 AE 86
Numeric character reference	&#6928;	&#x1B10;	&#43405;	&#xA98D;	&#7046;	&#x1B86;
