= Perso-Arabic Script Code for Information Interchange =

Indian government standard

Perso-Arabic Script Code for Information Interchange (PASCII) is one of the Indian government standards for encoding languages using writing systems based on Perso-Arabic alphabet, in particular Kashmiri, Persian, Sindhi and Urdu. The ISCII encoding was originally intended to cover both the Brahmi-derived writing systems of India and the Arabic-based systems, but it was subsequently decided to encode the Arabic-based writing systems separately.

PASCII has now been rendered largely obsolete by Unicode. The encoding of the Arabic script in Unicode is based on ISO/IEC 8859-6 rather than PASCII

== Code page layout ==
The following table shows the character set for PASCII. Each character is shown with its decimal code and its Unicode equivalent.

PASCII
	0	1	2	3	4	5	6	7	8	9	A	B	C	D	E	F
0x	NUL	SOH	STX	ETX	EOT	ENQ	ACK	BEL	BS	HT	LF	VT	FF	CR	SO	SI
1x	DLE	DC1	DC2	DC3	DC4	NAK	SYN	ETB	CAN	EM	SUB	ESC	FS	GS	RS	US
2x	SP	!	"	#	$	%	&	'	(	)	*	+	,	-	.	/
3x	0	1	2	3	4	5	6	7	8	9	:	;	<	=	>	?
4x	@	A	B	C	D	E	F	G	H	I	J	K	L	M	N	O
5x	P	Q	R	S	T	U	V	W	X	Y	Z	[	\	]		_
6x	`	a	b	c	d	e	f	g	h	i	j	k	l	m	n	o
7x	p	q	r	s	t	u	v	w	x	y	z	{	|	}	~	DEL
8x		ـ	ا	آ	ب	ٻ	ڀ	پ	ڦ	ت	ة	ٿ	ٹ (Note: This character is displayed as ٽ (Unicode point 067D) for Sindhi texts.)	ٺ	ث	ج
9x	ڄ	ڃ	چ	ڇ	ح	خ	د	ڌ	ڈ (Note: This character is displayed as ڊ (Unicode point 068A) for Sindhi texts.)	ڏ	ڍ	ذ	ر	ڑ (Note: This character is displayed as ڙ (Unicode point 0699) for Sindhi texts.)	ڙﻬ	ز
Ax	ژ	س	ش	ص	ض	ط	ظ	ع	غ	ف	ق	ڪ (Note: This character is usually displayed as ک (Unicode point 06A9) in non-Sindhi texts. See also: Khē)	ک	گ	ڳ	ڱ
Bx	ل	م	ن	ں	ڻ	و	ۄ	ه	ھ	ء	ى	ؠ	ۓ	ے	َ	ِ
Cx	ُ	ٗ	ٔ	ٕ	ٔ (Note: This code space is used for Kashmiri hamza, an orthographic variation not used in Unicode. This diacritic on an alif is 0672 in Unicode.)	ٟ	ّ	ٓ	ۡ	ٰ	ٖ	(Note: This diacritic currently has no Unicode support. This diacritic on an alif is 0671 in Unicode.)	…	ؔ	،	ؐ
Dx	ؓ	ؒ	ؑ	ࣗ	(Note: This combining superscript letter kaf currently has no Unicode support.)	ۙ	ۚ	ۢ	؁ (Note: This punctuation mark currently has no Unicode support. Nearest equivalent shown.)	٪	٬	٫	۰	۱	۲	۳
Ex	۴	۵	۶	۷	۸	۹	!	“	”	‘	’	(	)	٭	+	ATR
Fx	-	/	؛	:	؟	=	۔	۝	●	٬	DM	LB	◌	·		
