= Ā (Indic) =

Letter "Ā" in Indic scripts

Example glyphs
- Bengali–Assamese: আ
- Tibetan: ཨཱ
- Tamil: ஆ
- Thai: า
- Malayalam: ആ
- Sinhala: ආ
- Ashoka Brahmi: Ā
- Devanagari: आ

Cognates
- Hebrew: א
- Greek: Α
- Latin: A, Ɑ
- Cyrillic: А, Я, Ҍ

Properties
- Phonemic representation: /ɑː/ /aː/
- IAST transliteration: ā Ā
- ISCII code point: A5 (165)

Ā is a vowel of Indic abugidas. In modern Indic scripts, Aa is derived from the early "Ashoka" Brahmi letter after having gone through the Gupta letter. As an Indic vowel, "Ā" comes in two normally distinct forms: 1) as an independent letter, and 2) as a vowel sign for modifying a base consonant. Bare consonants without a modifying vowel sign have the inherent short "A" vowel.

== Āryabhaṭa numeration ==
Aryabhata used Devanagari letters for numbers, very similar to the Greek numerals, even after the invention of Indian numerals. The "Ā" modifier could be used to indicate a consonant's base value, although the unmodified consonant had this value as well. The independent vowel letter आ was not used to indicate any numeric value in the Aryabhata system.

== Historic Ā ==
There are three different general early historic scripts - Brahmi and its variants, Kharoṣṭhī, and Tocharian, the so-called slanting Brahmi. Aa as found in standard Brahmi, was a simple geometric shape, with variations toward more flowing forms by the Gupta. Like all Brahmic scripts, Tocharian Ā has an accompanying vowel mark for modifying a base consonant. In Kharoṣṭhī, the only independent vowel letter is for the inherent A. All other independent vowels, including Ā are indicated with vowel marks added to the letter A.

=== Brahmi Ā ===
The Brahmi letter Ā, is probably derived from the Aramaic Alef, and is thus related to the modern Latin A and Greek Alpha. Several identifiable styles of writing the Brahmi Aa can be found, most associated with a specific set of inscriptions from an artifact or diverse records from an historic period. As the earliest and most geometric style of Brahmi, the letters found on the Edicts of Ashoka and other records from around that time are normally the reference form for Brahmi letters, with vowel marks not attested until later forms of Brahmi back-formed to match the geometric writing style.

Brahmi Ā historic forms
Ashoka (3rd-1st c. BCE)	Girnar (~150 BCE)	Kushana (~150-250 CE)	Gujarat (~250 CE)	Gupta (~350 CE)

=== Tocharian Ā ===
The Tocharian letter is derived from the Brahmi. Unlike some of the consonants, Tocharian vowels do not have a Fremdzeichen form.

Tocharian consonants with Ā vowel marks
Kaa	Khaa	Gaa	Ghaa	Caa	Chaa	Jaa	Jhaa	Nyaa	Ṭaa	Ṭhaa	Ḍaa	Ḍhaa	Ṇaa
Taa	Thaa	Daa	Dhaa	Naa	Paa	Phaa	Baa	Bhaa	Maa	Yaa	Raa	Laa	Vaa
Śaa	Ṣaa	Saa	Haa										

=== Kharoṣṭhī Ā ===
The Kharoṣṭhī letter Ā is indicated with the vowel length mark. As an independent vowel, Ā is indicated by adding this vowel mark to the independent vowel letter A.

== Devanagari Ā ==
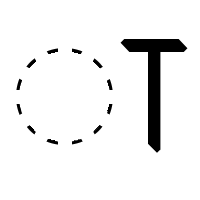
Devanagari independent Ā and Ā vowel sign.

Ā (आ) is a vowel of the Devanagari abugida. It ultimately arose from the Brahmi letter, after having gone through the Gupta letter. Letters that derive from it are the Gujarati letter આ, and the Modi letter 𑘁.

=== Devanagari Using Languages ===
The Devanagari script is used to write the Hindi language, Sanskrit and the majority of Indo-Aryan languages. In most of these languages, आ is pronounced as [aː] or [ɐː]. Like all Indic scripts, Devanagari vowels come in two forms: an independent vowel form for syllables that begin with a vowel sound, and a vowel sign attached to base consonant to override the inherent /ə/ vowel.

== Bengali Ā ==
Bengali independent Ā and Ā vowel sign.

Ā (আ) is a vowel of the Bengali abugida. It is derived from the Siddhaṃ letter, and is marked by a similar horizontal head line, but less geometric shape, than its Devanagari counterpart, आ.

=== Bengali Script Using Languages ===
The Bengali script is used to write several languages of eastern India, notably the Bengali language and Assamese. In most languages, আ is pronounced as [ä]. Like all Indic scripts, Bengali vowels come in two forms: an independent vowel form for syllables that begin with a vowel sound, and a vowel sign attached to base consonant to override the inherent /ɔ/ vowel.

== Tirhuta Ā ==
Tirhuta independent vowel and vowel sign Ā.

Ā (𑒂) is a vowel of the Tirhuta abugida. It ultimately arose from the Brahmi letter, via the Siddhaṃ letter Aa. Like in other Indic scripts, Tirhuta vowels have two forms: an independent letter for word and syllable-initial vowel sounds, and a vowel sign for changing the inherent "a" of consonant letters. Vowel signs in Tirhuta usually sit adjacent to its base consonant - below, to the left, right, or both left and right, but are always pronounced after the consonant sound. No consonants are altered in form when adding the Ā vowel mark, although there are some consonant+vowel ligatures in Tirhuta.

== Gujarati Ā ==
Gujarati independent Ā and Ā vowel sign.

Ā (આ) is a vowel of the Gujarati abugida. It is derived from the Devanagari Ā, and ultimately the Brahmi letter.

=== Gujarati-using Languages ===
The Gujarati script is used to write the Gujarati and Kutchi languages. In both languages, આ is pronounced as [ā]. Like all Indic scripts, Gujarati vowels come in two forms: an independent vowel form for syllables that begin with a vowel sound, and a vowel sign attached to base consonant to override the inherent /ə/ vowel.

== Telugu Ā ==
Telugu independent vowel and vowel sign Ā.

Ā (ఆ) is a vowel of the Telugu abugida. It ultimately arose from the Brahmi letter. It is closely related to the Kannada letter ಆ. Like in other Indic scripts, Telugu vowels have two forms: and independent letter for word and syllable-initial vowel sounds, and a vowel sign for changing the inherent "a" of Telugu consonant letters. Vowel signs in Telugu can interact with a base consonant in one of three ways: 1) the vowel sign touches or sits adjacent to the base consonant without modifying the shape of either 2) the vowel sign sits directly above the consonant, replacing its v-shaped headline, 3) the vowel sign and consonant interact, forming a ligature.

Telugu Hā, showing a consonant+vowel ligature

Telugu Ā vowel sign on క, ఖ, గ, ఘ & ఙ: Kā, Khā, Gā, Ghā and Ngā. Note that how the vowel sign interacts with the base consonant is dependent on the location of the headline, the absence of a headline, and the presence of a tail to attach to.

== Malayalam Ā ==
Malayalam independent vowel and vowel sign Ā.

Ā (ആ) is a vowel of the Malayalam abugida. It ultimately arose from the Brahmi letter, via the Grantha letter aa. Like in other Indic scripts, Malayalam vowels have two forms: an independent letter for word and syllable-initial vowel sounds, and a vowel sign for changing the inherent "a" of consonant letters. Vowel signs in Malayalam usually sit adjacent to its base consonant - below, to the left, right, or both left and right, but are always pronounced after the consonant sound.

== Odia Ā ==
Odia independent and vowel sign Ā

Ā (ଆ) is a vowel of the Odia abugida. It ultimately arose from the Brahmi letter, via the Siddhaṃ letter aa. Like in other Indic scripts, Odia vowels have two forms: an independent letter for word and syllable-initial vowel sounds, and a vowel sign for changing the inherent "a" of consonant letters. Vowel signs in Odia usually sit adjacent to its base consonant - below, to the left, right, or both left and right, but are always pronounced after the consonant sound. No base consonants are altered in form when adding a vowel sign, and there are no consonant+vowel ligatures in Odia.

== Kaithi Ā ==
Kaithi independent vowel and vowel sign Ā.

Ā (𑂄) is a vowel of the Kaithi abugida. It ultimately arose from the Brahmi letter, via the Siddhaṃ letter aa. Like in other Indic scripts, Kaithi vowels have two forms: an independent letter for word and syllable-initial vowel sounds, and a vowel sign for changing the inherent "a" of consonant letters. Vowel signs in Kaithi usually sit adjacent to its base consonant - below, to the left, right, or both left and right, but are always pronounced after the consonant sound. No base consonants are altered in form when adding a vowel sign, and there are no consonant+vowel ligatures in Kaithi.

== Comparison of Ā ==
The various Indic scripts are generally related to each other through adaptation and borrowing, and as such the glyphs for cognate letters, including Ā, are related as well.

Comparison of Ā in different scripts

Aramaic
Kharoṣṭhī 𐨌	Ashoka Brahmi / 𑀸	Kushana Brahmi (Note: The middle "Kushana" form of Brahmi is a later style that emerged as Brahmi scripts were beginning to proliferate. Gupta Brahmi was definitely a stylistic descendant from Kushana, but other Brahmi-derived scripts may have descended from earlier forms.) / 𑀸	Tocharian (Note: Tocharian is probably derived from the middle period "Kushana" form of Brahmi, although artifacts from that time are not plentiful enough to establish a definite succession.)
Gupta Brahmi / 𑀸	Pallava
Kadamba -
Bhaiksuki 𑰁 / 𑰯	Siddhaṃ / 𑖯	Grantha 𑌆 / 𑌾	Cham ꨩ
Sinhala ආ / ා	Pyu / Old Mon (Note: Pyu and Old Mon are probably the precursors of the Burmese script, and may be derived from either the Pallava or Kadamba script) -
Tibetan ཱ	Newa 𑐁 / 𑐵	Ahom 𑜡	Malayalam ആ / ാ
Telugu ఆ / ా	Burmese အာ / ာ, ါ
Lepcha ᰦ	Ranjana	Saurashtra ꢃ / ꢵ	Dives Akuru 𑤁 / 𑤱
Kannada ಆ / ಾ	Kayah Li -
Limbu -	Soyombo (Note: May also be derived from Devangari (see bottom left of table)) 𑩛	Khmer អា / ា	Tamil ஆ / ா
Chakma 𑄃 / 𑅅	Tai Tham ᩣ, ᩤ
Meitei Mayek ꯥ	Gaudi -	Thai า	Lao າ
Tai Le ᥣ
Marchen 𑲈 / 𑲰	Tirhuta 𑒂 / 𑒰	New Tai Lue ᦱ	Tai Viet ꪱ	Aksara Kawi 𑼅 / 𑼴, 𑼵
'Phags-pa -	Odia ଆ / ା	Sharada 𑆄 / 𑆳	Rejang -	Batak -	Buginese -
Zanabazar Square -	Bengali–Assamese আ / া	Takri 𑚁 / 𑚭	Javanese ꦴ	Balinese ᬆ / ᬵ	Makasar -
Hangul (Note: The Origin of Hangul from 'Phags-pa is one of limited influence, inspiring at most a few basic letter shapes. Hangul does not function as an Indic abugida.) -	Northern Nagari -	Dogri 𑠁 / 𑠬	Laṇḍā -	Sundanese -	Baybayin -
Modi 𑘁 / 𑘰	Gujarati આ / ા	Khojki 𑈁 / 𑈬	Khudabadi 𑊱 / 𑋠	Mahajani -	Tagbanwa -
Devanagari आ / ा	Nandinagari 𑦡 / 𑧑	Kaithi / 𑂰	Gurmukhi ਆ / ਾ	Multani -	Buhid -
Canadian Syllabics (Note: Although the basic letter forms of the Canadian Aboriginal Syllabics were derived from handwritten Devanagari letters, this abugida indicates vowel sounds by rotations of the letter form, rather than the use of vowel diacritics as is standard in Indic abugidas.) -	Soyombo (Note: May also be derived from Ranjana (see above)) 𑩛	Sylheti Nagari -	Gunjala Gondi 𑵡 / 𑶊	Masaram Gondi (Note: Masaram Gondi acts as an Indic abugida, but its letterforms were not derived from any single precursor script.) 𑴁 / 𑴱	Hanuno'o -

== Character encodings of Ā ==
Most Indic scripts are encoded in the Unicode Standard, and as such the letter Ā in those scripts can usually be represented in plain text with a single codepoint. However, if the letter A is used as a consonant or a vowel support, the letter Ā is usually encoded as letter A plus vowel sign Ā. Ā from several modern-use scripts can also be found in legacy encodings, such as ISCII.

Character information
Preview	आ		আ		ஆ		ఆ		ଆ		ಆ		ആ		આ		ਆ	
Unicode name	DEVANAGARI LETTER AA		BENGALI LETTER AA		TAMIL LETTER AA		TELUGU LETTER AA		ORIYA LETTER AA		KANNADA LETTER AA		MALAYALAM LETTER AA		GUJARATI LETTER AA		GURMUKHI LETTER AA	
Encodings	decimal	hex	dec	hex	dec	hex	dec	hex	dec	hex	dec	hex	dec	hex	dec	hex	dec	hex
Unicode	2310	U+0906	2438	U+0986	2950	U+0B86	3078	U+0C06	2822	U+0B06	3206	U+0C86	3334	U+0D06	2694	U+0A86	2566	U+0A06
UTF-8	224 164 134	E0 A4 86	224 166 134	E0 A6 86	224 174 134	E0 AE 86	224 176 134	E0 B0 86	224 172 134	E0 AC 86	224 178 134	E0 B2 86	224 180 134	E0 B4 86	224 170 134	E0 AA 86	224 168 134	E0 A8 86
Numeric character reference	&#2310;	&#x906;	&#2438;	&#x986;	&#2950;	&#xB86;	&#3078;	&#xC06;	&#2822;	&#xB06;	&#3206;	&#xC86;	&#3334;	&#xD06;	&#2694;	&#xA86;	&#2566;	&#xA06;
ISCII	165	A5	165	A5	165	A5	165	A5	165	A5	165	A5	165	A5	165	A5	165	A5

Character information
Preview	Ashoka Kushana Gupta		𐨌				𑌆	
Unicode name	BRAHMI LETTER AA		KHAROSHTHI VOWEL LENGTH MARK		SIDDHAM LETTER AA		GRANTHA LETTER AA	
Encodings	decimal	hex	dec	hex	dec	hex	dec	hex
Unicode	69638	U+11006	68108	U+10A0C	71041	U+11581	70406	U+11306
UTF-8	240 145 128 134	F0 91 80 86	240 144 168 140	F0 90 A8 8C	240 145 150 129	F0 91 96 81	240 145 140 134	F0 91 8C 86
UTF-16	55300 56326	D804 DC06	55298 56844	D802 DE0C	55301 56705	D805 DD81	55300 57094	D804 DF06
Numeric character reference	&#69638;	&#x11006;	&#68108;	&#x10A0C;	&#71041;	&#x11581;	&#70406;	&#x11306;

Character information
Preview	𑐁		𑰁		𑆄	
Unicode name	NEWA LETTER AA		BHAIKSUKI LETTER AA		SHARADA LETTER AA	
Encodings	decimal	hex	dec	hex	dec	hex
Unicode	70657	U+11401	72705	U+11C01	70020	U+11184
UTF-8	240 145 144 129	F0 91 90 81	240 145 176 129	F0 91 B0 81	240 145 134 132	F0 91 86 84
UTF-16	55301 56321	D805 DC01	55303 56321	D807 DC01	55300 56708	D804 DD84
Numeric character reference	&#70657;	&#x11401;	&#72705;	&#x11C01;	&#70020;	&#x11184;

Character information
Preview	ᦱ	
Unicode name	NEW TAI LUE VOWEL SIGN AA	
Encodings	decimal	hex
Unicode	6577	U+19B1
UTF-8	225 166 177	E1 A6 B1
Numeric character reference	&#6577;	&#x19B1;

- See further below for Burmese and Tai Tham codepoints.

Character information
Preview	າ		า		ꪱ	
Unicode name	LAO VOWEL SIGN AA		THAI CHARACTER SARA AA		TAI VIET VOWEL AA	
Encodings	decimal	hex	dec	hex	dec	hex
Unicode	3762	U+0EB2	3634	U+0E32	43697	U+AAB1
UTF-8	224 186 178	E0 BA B2	224 184 178	E0 B8 B2	234 170 177	EA AA B1
Numeric character reference	&#3762;	&#xEB2;	&#3634;	&#xE32;	&#43697;	&#xAAB1;

- See further below for Khmer codepoints.

Character information
Preview	ආ		𑄃		𑜡		𑤁		ꢃ		ꨩ	
Unicode name	SINHALA LETTER AAYANNA		CHAKMA LETTER AA		AHOM VOWEL SIGN AA		DIVES AKURU LETTER AA		SAURASHTRA LETTER AA		CHAM VOWEL SIGN AA	
Encodings	decimal	hex	dec	hex	dec	hex	dec	hex	dec	hex	dec	hex
Unicode	3462	U+0D86	69891	U+11103	71457	U+11721	71937	U+11901	43139	U+A883	43561	U+AA29
UTF-8	224 182 134	E0 B6 86	240 145 132 131	F0 91 84 83	240 145 156 161	F0 91 9C A1	240 145 164 129	F0 91 A4 81	234 162 131	EA A2 83	234 168 169	EA A8 A9
UTF-16	3462	0D86	55300 56579	D804 DD03	55301 57121	D805 DF21	55302 56577	D806 DD01	43139	A883	43561	AA29
Numeric character reference	&#3462;	&#xD86;	&#69891;	&#x11103;	&#71457;	&#x11721;	&#71937;	&#x11901;	&#43139;	&#xA883;	&#43561;	&#xAA29;

Character information
Preview	𑘁		𑦡		𑵡			
Unicode name	MODI LETTER AA		NANDINAGARI LETTER AA		GUNJALA GONDI LETTER AA		KAITHI LETTER AA	
Encodings	decimal	hex	dec	hex	dec	hex	dec	hex
Unicode	71169	U+11601	72097	U+119A1	73057	U+11D61	69764	U+11084
UTF-8	240 145 152 129	F0 91 98 81	240 145 166 161	F0 91 A6 A1	240 145 181 161	F0 91 B5 A1	240 145 130 132	F0 91 82 84
UTF-16	55301 56833	D805 DE01	55302 56737	D806 DDA1	55303 56673	D807 DD61	55300 56452	D804 DC84
Numeric character reference	&#71169;	&#x11601;	&#72097;	&#x119A1;	&#73057;	&#x11D61;	&#69764;	&#x11084;

Character information
Preview	𑒂		ᰦ		ꯥ		𑲰	
Unicode name	TIRHUTA LETTER AA		LEPCHA VOWEL SIGN AA		MEETEI MAYEK VOWEL SIGN ANAP		MARCHEN VOWEL SIGN AA	
Encodings	decimal	hex	dec	hex	dec	hex	dec	hex
Unicode	70786	U+11482	7206	U+1C26	44005	U+ABE5	72880	U+11CB0
UTF-8	240 145 146 130	F0 91 92 82	225 176 166	E1 B0 A6	234 175 165	EA AF A5	240 145 178 176	F0 91 B2 B0
UTF-16	55301 56450	D805 DC82	7206	1C26	44005	ABE5	55303 56496	D807 DCB0
Numeric character reference	&#70786;	&#x11482;	&#7206;	&#x1C26;	&#44005;	&#xABE5;	&#72880;	&#x11CB0;

Character information
Preview	𑚁		𑠁		𑈁		𑊱	
Unicode name	TAKRI LETTER AA		DOGRA LETTER AA		KHOJKI LETTER AA		KHUDAWADI LETTER AA	
Encodings	decimal	hex	dec	hex	dec	hex	dec	hex
Unicode	71297	U+11681	71681	U+11801	70145	U+11201	70321	U+112B1
UTF-8	240 145 154 129	F0 91 9A 81	240 145 160 129	F0 91 A0 81	240 145 136 129	F0 91 88 81	240 145 138 177	F0 91 8A B1
UTF-16	55301 56961	D805 DE81	55302 56321	D806 DC01	55300 56833	D804 DE01	55300 57009	D804 DEB1
Numeric character reference	&#71297;	&#x11681;	&#71681;	&#x11801;	&#70145;	&#x11201;	&#70321;	&#x112B1;

Character information
Preview	ᬆ		ꦴ	
Unicode name	BALINESE LETTER AKARA TEDUNG		JAVANESE VOWEL SIGN TARUNG	
Encodings	decimal	hex	dec	hex
Unicode	6918	U+1B06	43444	U+A9B4
UTF-8	225 172 134	E1 AC 86	234 166 180	EA A6 B4
Numeric character reference	&#6918;	&#x1B06;	&#43444;	&#xA9B4;

Character information
Preview	𑴁	
Unicode name	MASARAM GONDI LETTER AA	
Encodings	decimal	hex
Unicode	72961	U+11D01
UTF-8	240 145 180 129	F0 91 B4 81
UTF-16	55303 56577	D807 DD01
Numeric character reference	&#72961;	&#x11D01;

Character information
Preview	အာ		ာ		ါ		ᩋᩣ		ᩣ		ᩤ		អា		ា	
Unicode name	(UNNAMED SEQUENCE FOR MYANMAR VOWEL LETTER)		MYANMAR VOWEL SIGN AA		MYANMAR VOWEL SIGN TALL AA		(UNNAMED SEQUENCE FOR TAI THAM VOWEL LETTER)		TAI THAM VOWEL SIGN AA		TAI THAM VOWEL SIGN TALL AA		(UNNAMED SEQUENCE FOR KHMER VOWEL LETTER)		KHMER VOWEL SIGN AA	
Encodings	decimal	hex	dec	hex	dec	hex	dec	hex	dec	hex	dec	hex	dec	hex	dec	hex
Unicode	4129 4140	U+1021+102C	4140	U+102C	4139	U+102B	6731 6755	U+1A4B+1A63	6755	U+1A63	6756	U+1A64	6050 6070	U+17A2+17B6	6070	U+17B6
UTF-8	225 128 161 225 128 172	E1 80 A1 E1 80 AC	225 128 172	E1 80 AC	225 128 171	E1 80 AB	225 169 139 225 169 163	E1 A9 8B E1 A9 A3	225 169 163	E1 A9 A3	225 169 164	E1 A9 A4	225 158 162 225 158 182	E1 9E A2 E1 9E B6	225 158 182	E1 9E B6
Numeric character reference	&#4129;&#4140;	&#x1021;&#x102C;	&#4140;	&#x102C;	&#4139;	&#x102B;	&#6731;&#6755;	&#x1A4B;&#x1A63;	&#6755;	&#x1A63;	&#6756;	&#x1A64;	&#6050;&#6070;	&#x17A2;&#x17B6;	&#6070;	&#x17B6;
