= Ī (Indic) =

Letter "Ī" in Indic scripts

Example glyphs
- Bengali–Assamese: ঈ
- Tibetan: ཨཱི
- Tamil: ஈ
- Thai: ี
- Malayalam: ഈ
- Sinhala: ඊ
- Ashoka Brahmi: Ī
- Devanagari: ई

Cognates
- Hebrew: ע
- Greek: Ο, Ω
- Latin: O
- Cyrillic: О, Ѡ, Ѿ, Ꙋ, Ю

Properties
- Phonemic representation: /iː/
- IAST transliteration: ī Ī
- ISCII code point: A7 (167)

Ī is a vowel of Indic abugidas. In modern Indic scripts, Ī is derived from the early "Ashoka" Brahmi letter. As an Indic vowel, Ī comes in two normally distinct forms: 1) as an independent letter, and 2) as a vowel sign for modifying a base consonant. Bare consonants without a modifying vowel sign have the inherent "A" vowel.

== Āryabhaṭa numeration ==
Aryabhata used Devanagari letters for numbers, very similar to the Greek numerals, even after the invention of Indian numerals. The ई sign ी was used to modify a consonant's value ×10^{2}, but the vowel letter did not have an inherent value by itself.

== Historic Ī ==
There are three different general early historic scripts - Brahmi and its variants, Kharoṣṭhī, and Tocharian, the so-called slanting Brahmi. Ī as found in standard Brahmi, was a simple geometric shape, with variations toward more flowing forms by the Gujarat. Like all Brahmic scripts, Tocharian Ī has an accompanying vowel mark for modifying a base consonant. In Kharoṣṭhī, the only independent vowel letter is for the inherent A. All other independent vowels, including Ī are indicated with vowel marks added to the letter A.

=== Brahmi Ī ===
The Brahmi letter Ī, is probably derived from the altered Aramaic Ayin, and is thus related to the modern Latin O and Greek Omicron. Several identifiable styles of writing the Brahmi Ī can be found, most associated with a specific set of inscriptions from an artifact or diverse records from an historic period. As the earliest and most geometric style of Brahmi, the letters found on the Edicts of Ashoka and other records from around that time are normally the reference form for Brahmi letters, with vowel marks not attested until later forms of Brahmi back-formed to match the geometric writing style.

Brahmi Ī historic forms
Ashoka (3rd-1st c. BCE)	Girnar (~150 BCE)	Kushana (~150-250 CE)	Gujarat (~250 CE)	Gupta (~350 CE)
	No sample	No sample		No sample

=== Tocharian Ī ===
The Tocharian letter is derived from the Brahmi. Unlike some of the consonants, Tocharian vowels do not have a Fremdzeichen form.

Tocharian consonants with Ī vowel mark
Kī	Khī	Gī	Ghī	Cī	Chī	Jī	Jhī	Nyī	Ṭī	Ṭhī	Ḍī	Ḍhī	Ṇī
Tī	Thī	Dī	Dhī	Nī	Pī	Phī	Bī	Bhī	Mī	Yī	Rī	Lī	Vī
Śī	Ṣī	Sī	Hī										

=== Kharoṣṭhī Ī ===
The Kharoṣṭhī letter Ī is indicated with the I vowel mark plus the vowel length mark. As an independent vowel, Ī is indicated by adding the vowel marks to the independent vowel letter A.

== Devanagari Ī ==
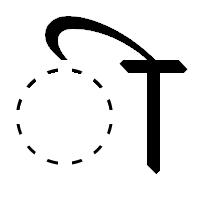
Devanagari independent Ī and Ī vowel sign.

Ī (ई) is a vowel of the Devanagari abugida. It ultimately arose from the Brahmi letter. Letters that derive from it are the Gujarati letter ઈ, and the Modi letter 𑘃.

=== Devanagari Using Languages ===
The Devanagari script is used to write the Hindi language, Sanskrit and the majority of Indo-Aryan languages. In most of these languages, ई is pronounced as [ī]. Like all Indic scripts, Devanagari vowels come in two forms: an independent vowel form for syllables that begin with a vowel sound, and a vowel sign attached to base consonant to override the inherent /ə/ vowel.

== Bengali Ī ==
Bengali independent Ī and Ī vowel sign.

Ī (ঈ) is a vowel of the Bengali abugida. It is derived from the Siddhaṃ letter, and is marked by a similar horizontal head line, but less geometric shape, than its Devanagari counterpart, ई.

=== Bengali Script Using Languages ===
The Bengali script is used to write several languages of eastern India, notably the Bengali language and Assamese. In most languages, ঈ is pronounced as [ī]. Like all Indic scripts, Bengali vowels come in two forms: an independent vowel form for syllables that begin with a vowel sound, and a vowel sign attached to base consonant to override the inherent /ɔ/ vowel.

== Gujarati Ī ==
Gujarati independent Ī and Ī vowel sign.

Ī (ઈ) is a vowel of the Gujarati abugida. It is derived from the Devanagari Ī, and ultimately the Brahmi letter.

=== Gujarati-using Languages ===
The Gujarati script is used to write the Gujarati and Kutchi languages. In both languages, ઈ is pronounced as [ī]. Like all Indic scripts, Gujarati vowels come in two forms: an independent vowel form for syllables that begin with a vowel sound, and a vowel sign attached to base consonant to override the inherent /ə/ vowel. In addition to the standard vowel sign, Ī forms a unique ligature when combined with the consonant J:

- જ (j) + ઈ (ī) gives the ligature jī:

== Telugu Ī ==
Telugu independent vowel and vowel sign Ī.

Ī (ఈ) is a vowel of the Telugu abugida. It ultimately arose from the Brahmi letter. It is closely related to the Kannada letter ಈ. Like in other Indic scripts, Telugu vowels have two forms: and independent letter for word and syllable-initial vowel sounds, and a vowel sign for changing the inherent "a" of Telugu consonant letters. Vowel signs in Telugu can interact with a base consonant in one of three ways: 1) the vowel sign touches or sits adjacent to the base consonant without modifying the shape of either 2) the vowel sign sits directly above the consonant, replacing its v-shaped headline, 3) the vowel sign and consonant interact, forming a ligature.

Telugu Ī vowel sign on క, ఖ, గ, ఘ & ఙ: Kī, Khī, Gī, Ghī and Ngī. Note that how the vowel sign interacts with the base consonant is dependent on the location of the headline, the absence of a headline, and the presence of a tail to attach to.

== Malayalam Ī ==
Malayalam independent vowel and vowel sign Ī.

Ī (ഈ) is a vowel of the Malayalam abugida. It ultimately arose from the Brahmi letter, via the Grantha letter ī. Like in other Indic scripts, Malayalam vowels have two forms: an independent letter for word and syllable-initial vowel sounds, and a vowel sign for changing the inherent "a" of consonant letters. Vowel signs in Malayalam usually sit adjacent to its base consonant - below, to the left, right, or both left and right, but are always pronounced after the consonant sound.

== Odia Ī ==
Odia independent vowel and vowel sign Ī

Ī (ଈ) is a vowel of the Odia abugida. It ultimately arose from the Brahmi letter, via the Siddhaṃ letter ī. Like in other Indic scripts, Odia vowels have two forms: an independent letter for word and syllable-initial vowel sounds, and a vowel sign for changing the inherent "a" of consonant letters. Vowel signs in Odia usually sit adjacent to its base consonant - below, to the left, right, or both left and right, but are always pronounced after the consonant sound. No base consonants are altered in form when adding a vowel sign, and there are no consonant+vowel ligatures in Odia.

== Kaithi Ī ==
Kaithi independent vowel and vowel sign Ī.

Ī (𑂆) is a vowel of the Kaithi abugida. It ultimately arose from the Brahmi letter, via the Siddhaṃ letter Ī. Like in other Indic scripts, Kaithi vowels have two forms: an independent letter for word and syllable-initial vowel sounds, and a vowel sign for changing the inherent "a" of consonant letters. Vowel signs in Kaithi usually sit adjacent to its base consonant - below, to the left, right, or both left and right, but are always pronounced after the consonant sound. No base consonants are altered in form when adding a vowel sign, and there are no consonant+vowel ligatures in Kaithi.

== Tirhuta Ī ==
Tirhuta independent vowel and vowel sign Ī.

Ī (𑒄) is a vowel of the Tirhuta abugida. It ultimately arose from the Brahmi letter, via the Siddhaṃ letter Ii. Like in other Indic scripts, Tirhuta vowels have two forms: an independent letter for word and syllable-initial vowel sounds, and a vowel sign for changing the inherent "a" of consonant letters. Vowel signs in Tirhuta usually sit adjacent to its base consonant - below, to the left, right, or both left and right, but are always pronounced after the consonant sound. No consonants are altered in form when adding the Ī vowel mark, although there are some consonant+vowel ligatures in Tirhuta.

== Comparison of Ī ==
The various Indic scripts are generally related to each other through adaptation and borrowing, and as such the glyphs for cognate letters, including Ī, are related as well.

Comparison of Ī in different scripts

Aramaic
Kharoṣṭhī 𐨁𐨌	Ashoka Brahmi / 𑀻	Kushana Brahmi (Note: The middle "Kushana" form of Brahmi is a later style that emerged as Brahmi scripts were beginning to proliferate. Gupta Brahmi was definitely a stylistic descendant from Kushana, but other Brahmi-derived scripts may have descended from earlier forms.) 𑀈 / 𑀻	Tocharian (Note: Tocharian is probably derived from the middle period "Kushana" form of Brahmi, although artifacts from that time are not plentiful enough to establish a definite succession.) -
Gupta Brahmi 𑀈 / 𑀻	Pallava
Kadamba -
Bhaiksuki 𑰃 / 𑰱	Siddhaṃ / 𑖱	Grantha 𑌈 / 𑍀	Cham ꨫ
Sinhala ඊ / ී	Pyu / Old Mon (Note: Pyu and Old Mon are probably the precursors of the Burmese script, and may be derived from either the Pallava or Kadamba script) -
Tibetan ཱི	Newa 𑐃 / 𑐷	Ahom 𑜣	Malayalam ഈ / ീ
Telugu ఈ / ీ	Burmese ဤ / ီ
Lepcha -	Ranjana	Saurashtra ꢅ / ꢷ	Dives Akuru 𑤃 / 𑤲
Kannada ಈ / ೀ	Kayah Li -
Limbu -	Soyombo (Note: May also be derived from Devangari (see bottom left of table)) 𑩑𑩛	Khmer ឦ / ី	Tamil ஈ / ீ
Chakma 𑄩	Tai Tham ᩎ / ᩦ
Meitei Mayek ꫫ	Gaudi -	Thai ี	Lao ີ
Tai Le -
Marchen -	Tirhuta 𑒄 / 𑒲	New Tai Lue -	Tai Viet -	Aksara Kawi 𑼇 / 𑼷
'Phags-pa -	Odia ଈ / ୀ	Sharada 𑆆 / 𑆵	Rejang -	Batak -	Buginese -
Zanabazar Square -	Bengali–Assamese ঈ / ী	Takri 𑚃 / 𑚯	Javanese ꦇ / ꦷ	Balinese ᬈ / ᬷ	Makasar -
Hangul (Note: The Origin of Hangul from 'Phags-pa is one of limited influence, inspiring at most a few basic letter shapes. Hangul does not function as an Indic abugida.) -	Northern Nagari -	Dogri 𑠃 / 𑠮	Laṇḍā -	Sundanese -	Baybayin -
Modi 𑘃 / 𑘲	Gujarati ઈ / ી	Khojki 𑈂 / 𑈮	Khudabadi 𑊳 / 𑋢	Mahajani -	Tagbanwa -
Devanagari ई / ी	Nandinagari 𑦣 / 𑧓	Kaithi / 𑂲	Gurmukhi ਈ / ੀ	Multani -	Buhid -
Canadian Syllabics (Note: Although the basic letter forms of the Canadian Aboriginal Syllabics were derived from handwritten Devanagari letters, this abugida indicates vowel sounds by rotations of the letter form, rather than the use of vowel diacritics as is standard in Indic abugidas.) -	Soyombo (Note: May also be derived from Ranjana (see above)) 𑩑𑩛	Sylheti Nagari -	Gunjala Gondi 𑵣 / 𑶌	Masaram Gondi (Note: Masaram Gondi acts as an Indic abugida, but its letterforms were not derived from any single precursor script.) 𑴃 / 𑴳	Hanuno'o -

== Character encodings of Ī ==
Most Indic scripts are encoded in the Unicode Standard, and as such the letter Ī in those scripts can be represented in plain text with unique codepoint. Ī from several modern-use scripts can also be found in legacy encodings, such as ISCII.

Character information
Preview	ई		ঈ		ஈ		ఈ		ଈ		ಈ		ഈ		ઈ		ਈ	
Unicode name	DEVANAGARI LETTER II		BENGALI LETTER II		TAMIL LETTER II		TELUGU LETTER II		ORIYA LETTER II		KANNADA LETTER II		MALAYALAM LETTER II		GUJARATI LETTER II		GURMUKHI LETTER II	
Encodings	decimal	hex	dec	hex	dec	hex	dec	hex	dec	hex	dec	hex	dec	hex	dec	hex	dec	hex
Unicode	2312	U+0908	2440	U+0988	2952	U+0B88	3080	U+0C08	2824	U+0B08	3208	U+0C88	3336	U+0D08	2696	U+0A88	2568	U+0A08
UTF-8	224 164 136	E0 A4 88	224 166 136	E0 A6 88	224 174 136	E0 AE 88	224 176 136	E0 B0 88	224 172 136	E0 AC 88	224 178 136	E0 B2 88	224 180 136	E0 B4 88	224 170 136	E0 AA 88	224 168 136	E0 A8 88
Numeric character reference	&#2312;	&#x908;	&#2440;	&#x988;	&#2952;	&#xB88;	&#3080;	&#xC08;	&#2824;	&#xB08;	&#3208;	&#xC88;	&#3336;	&#xD08;	&#2696;	&#xA88;	&#2568;	&#xA08;
ISCII	167	A7	167	A7	167	A7	167	A7	167	A7	167	A7	167	A7	167	A7	167	A7

Character information
Preview	Ashoka Kushana Gupta				𑌈	
Unicode name	BRAHMI LETTER II		SIDDHAM LETTER II		GRANTHA LETTER II	
Encodings	decimal	hex	dec	hex	dec	hex
Unicode	69640	U+11008	71043	U+11583	70408	U+11308
UTF-8	240 145 128 136	F0 91 80 88	240 145 150 131	F0 91 96 83	240 145 140 136	F0 91 8C 88
UTF-16	55300 56328	D804 DC08	55301 56707	D805 DD83	55300 57096	D804 DF08
Numeric character reference	&#69640;	&#x11008;	&#71043;	&#x11583;	&#70408;	&#x11308;

Character information
Preview	𑐃		𑰃		𑆆	
Unicode name	NEWA LETTER II		BHAIKSUKI LETTER II		SHARADA LETTER II	
Encodings	decimal	hex	dec	hex	dec	hex
Unicode	70659	U+11403	72707	U+11C03	70022	U+11186
UTF-8	240 145 144 131	F0 91 90 83	240 145 176 131	F0 91 B0 83	240 145 134 134	F0 91 86 86
UTF-16	55301 56323	D805 DC03	55303 56323	D807 DC03	55300 56710	D804 DD86
Numeric character reference	&#70659;	&#x11403;	&#72707;	&#x11C03;	&#70022;	&#x11186;

Character information
Preview	ဤ		ᩎ	
Unicode name	MYANMAR LETTER II		TAI THAM LETTER II	
Encodings	decimal	hex	dec	hex
Unicode	4132	U+1024	6734	U+1A4E
UTF-8	225 128 164	E1 80 A4	225 169 142	E1 A9 8E
Numeric character reference	&#4132;	&#x1024;	&#6734;	&#x1A4E;

Character information
Preview	ឦ		ี	
Unicode name	KHMER INDEPENDENT VOWEL QII		THAI CHARACTER SARA II	
Encodings	decimal	hex	dec	hex
Unicode	6054	U+17A6	3637	U+0E35
UTF-8	225 158 166	E1 9E A6	224 184 181	E0 B8 B5
Numeric character reference	&#6054;	&#x17A6;	&#3637;	&#xE35;

Character information
Preview	ඊ		𑤃		ꢅ	
Unicode name	SINHALA LETTER IIYANNA		DIVES AKURU LETTER II		SAURASHTRA LETTER II	
Encodings	decimal	hex	dec	hex	dec	hex
Unicode	3466	U+0D8A	71939	U+11903	43141	U+A885
UTF-8	224 182 138	E0 B6 8A	240 145 164 131	F0 91 A4 83	234 162 133	EA A2 85
UTF-16	3466	0D8A	55302 56579	D806 DD03	43141	A885
Numeric character reference	&#3466;	&#xD8A;	&#71939;	&#x11903;	&#43141;	&#xA885;

Character information
Preview	𑘃		𑦣		𑵣			
Unicode name	MODI LETTER II		NANDINAGARI LETTER II		GUNJALA GONDI LETTER II		KAITHI LETTER II	
Encodings	decimal	hex	dec	hex	dec	hex	dec	hex
Unicode	71171	U+11603	72099	U+119A3	73059	U+11D63	69766	U+11086
UTF-8	240 145 152 131	F0 91 98 83	240 145 166 163	F0 91 A6 A3	240 145 181 163	F0 91 B5 A3	240 145 130 134	F0 91 82 86
UTF-16	55301 56835	D805 DE03	55302 56739	D806 DDA3	55303 56675	D807 DD63	55300 56454	D804 DC86
Numeric character reference	&#71171;	&#x11603;	&#72099;	&#x119A3;	&#73059;	&#x11D63;	&#69766;	&#x11086;

Character information
Preview	𑒄	
Unicode name	TIRHUTA LETTER II	
Encodings	decimal	hex
Unicode	70788	U+11484
UTF-8	240 145 146 132	F0 91 92 84
UTF-16	55301 56452	D805 DC84
Numeric character reference	&#70788;	&#x11484;

Character information
Preview	𑚃		𑠃		𑊳	
Unicode name	TAKRI LETTER II		DOGRA LETTER II		KHUDAWADI LETTER II	
Encodings	decimal	hex	dec	hex	dec	hex
Unicode	71299	U+11683	71683	U+11803	70323	U+112B3
UTF-8	240 145 154 131	F0 91 9A 83	240 145 160 131	F0 91 A0 83	240 145 138 179	F0 91 8A B3
UTF-16	55301 56963	D805 DE83	55302 56323	D806 DC03	55300 57011	D804 DEB3
Numeric character reference	&#71299;	&#x11683;	&#71683;	&#x11803;	&#70323;	&#x112B3;

Character information
Preview	ᬈ		ꦇ	
Unicode name	BALINESE LETTER IKARA TEDUNG		JAVANESE LETTER II	
Encodings	decimal	hex	dec	hex
Unicode	6920	U+1B08	43399	U+A987
UTF-8	225 172 136	E1 AC 88	234 166 135	EA A6 87
Numeric character reference	&#6920;	&#x1B08;	&#43399;	&#xA987;

Character information
Preview	𑴃	
Unicode name	MASARAM GONDI LETTER II	
Encodings	decimal	hex
Unicode	72963	U+11D03
UTF-8	240 145 180 131	F0 91 B4 83
UTF-16	55303 56579	D807 DD03
Numeric character reference	&#72963;	&#x11D03;
