= Ū (Indic) =

Letter "Ū" in Indic scripts

Example glyphs
- Bengali–Assamese: ঊ
- Tibetan: ཨཱུ
- Tamil: ஊ
- Thai: ู
- Malayalam: ഊ
- Sinhala: ඌ
- Ashoka Brahmi: 𑀊
- Devanagari: ऊ

Cognates
- Hebrew: ו
- Greek: Ϝ (Ϛ), Υ (Ȣ)
- Latin: F, V, U, W, Y, Ⅎ
- Cyrillic: Ѕ, У (Ӯ), Ѵ, Ю

Properties
- Phonemic representation: /uː/
- IAST transliteration: ū Ū
- ISCII code point: A9 (169)

Ū is a vowel of Indic abugidas. In modern Indic scripts, Ū is derived from the early "Ashoka" Brahmi letter. As an Indic vowel, Ū comes in two normally distinct forms: as an independent letter and as a vowel sign for modifying a base consonant. Bare consonants without a modifying vowel sign have the inherent "A" vowel.

== Āryabhaṭa numeration ==
Aryabhata used Devanagari letters for numbers, very similar to the Greek numerals, even after the invention of Indian numerals. The ू modifier sign was used to modify a consonant's value ×10^{4}, but the vowel letter ऊ did not have an inherent value by itself.

== Historic Ū ==
There are three different general early historic scripts - Brahmi and its variants, Kharoṣṭhī, and Tocharian, the so-called slanting Brahmi. Ū as found in standard Brahmi, was a simple geometric shape, with variations toward more flowing forms by the Gujarat. Like all Brahmic scripts, Tocharian Ū has an accompanying vowel mark for modifying a base consonant. In Kharoṣṭhī, the only independent vowel letter is for the inherent A. All other independent vowels, including Ū are indicated with vowel marks added to the letter A.

=== Brahmi Ū ===
The Brahmi letter Ū, is probably derived from the altered Aramaic Waw, and is thus related to the modern Latin F, V, U, W, Y and Greek Upsilon. Several identifiable styles of writing the Brahmi Ū can be found, most associated with a specific set of inscriptions from an artifact or diverse records from an historic period. As the earliest and most geometric style of Brahmi, the letters found on the Edicts of Ashoka and other records from around that time are normally the reference form for Brahmi letters, with some vowel marks not attested until later forms of Brahmi back-formed to match the geometric writing style.

Brahmi Ū historic forms
Ashoka (3rd-1st c. BCE)	Girnar (~150 BCE)	Kushana (~150-250 CE)	Gujarat (~250 CE)	Gupta (~350 CE)
	No sample	No sample		No sample

=== Tocharian Ū ===
The Tocharian letter is derived from the Brahmi. Unlike some of the consonants, Tocharian vowels do not have a Fremdzeichen form.

Tocharian consonants with Ū vowel marks
Kū	Khū	Gū	Ghū	Cū	Chū	Jū	Jhū	Nyū	Ṭū	Ṭhū	Ḍū	Ḍhū	Ṇū
Tū	Thū	Dū	Dhū	Nū	Pū	Phū	Bū	Bhū	Mū	Yū	Rū	Lū	Vū
Śū	Ṣū	Sū	Hū										

=== Kharoṣṭhī Ū ===
The Kharoṣṭhī letter Ū is indicated with the U vowel mark plus the vowel length mark. As an independent vowel, Ū is indicated by adding the vowel marks to the independent vowel letter A.

== Devanagari Ū ==
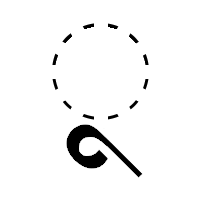
Devanagari independent Ū and Ū vowel sign.

Ū (ऊ) is a vowel of the Devanagari abugida. It ultimately arose from the Brahmi letter. Letters that derive from it are the Gujarati letter ઊ, and the Modi letter 𑘅.

=== Devanagari Using Languages ===
The Devanagari script is used to write the Hindi language, Sanskrit and the majority of Indo-Aryan languages. In most of these languages, ऊ is pronounced as [uː]. Like all Indic scripts, Devanagari vowels come in two forms: an independent vowel form for syllables that begin with a vowel sound, and a vowel sign attached to base consonant to override the inherent /ə/ vowel.

== Bengali Ū ==
Bengali independent Ū and Ū vowel sign.

Ū (ঊ) is a vowel of the Bengali abugida. It is derived from the Siddhaṃ letter, and is marked by a similar horizontal head line, but less geometric shape, than its Devanagari counterpart, ऊ.

=== Bengali Script Using Languages ===
The Bengali script is used to write several languages of eastern India, notably the Bengali language and Assamese. In most languages, ঊ is pronounced as [uː]. Like all Indic scripts, Bengali vowels come in two forms: an independent vowel form for syllables that begin with a vowel sound, and a vowel sign attached to base consonant to override the inherent /ɔ/ vowel.

== Gujarati Ū ==
Gujarati independent Ū and Ū vowel sign.

Ū (ઊ) is a vowel of the Gujarati abugida. It is derived from the Devanagari Ū, and ultimately the Brahmi letter.

=== Gujarati-using Languages ===
The Gujarati script is used to write the Gujarati and Kutchi languages. In both languages, ઊ is pronounced as [u]; there is no phonemic distinction from U (ઉ) in Gujarati. Like all Indic scripts, Gujarati vowels come in two forms: an independent vowel form for syllables that begin with a vowel sound, and a vowel sign attached to base consonant to override the inherent /ə/ vowel. In addition to the standard vowel sign, Ū forms a unique ligature when combined with the consonant R:

- ર (r) + ઊ (ū) gives the ligature રૂ (rū):

== Telugu Script ==
Telugu independent vowel and vowel sign Ū.

Ū (ఊ) is a vowel of the Telugu abugida. It ultimately arose from the Brahmi letter. It is closely related to the Kannada letter ಊ. Like in other Indic scripts, Telugu vowels have two forms: and independent letter for word and syllable-initial vowel sounds, and a vowel sign for changing the inherent "a" of Telugu consonant letters. Vowel signs in Telugu can interact with a base consonant in one of three ways: 1) the vowel sign touches or sits adjacent to the base consonant without modifying the shape of either 2) the vowel sign sits directly above the consonant, replacing its v-shaped headline, 3) the vowel sign and consonant interact, forming a ligature.

Telugu Ū vowel sign on క, ఖ, గ, ఘ & ఙ: Kū, Khū, Gū, Ghū and Ngū. As a right-side attaching vowel mark, it does not alter the shape of the underlying consonant, although there are variants of the vowel mark that attach in different ways.

== Malayalam Ū ==
Malayalam independent vowel and vowel sign Ū.

Ū (ഊ) is a vowel of the Malayalam abugida. It ultimately arose from the Brahmi letter, via the Grantha letter uu. Like in other Indic scripts, Malayalam vowels have two forms: an independent letter for word and syllable-initial vowel sounds, and a vowel sign for changing the inherent "a" of consonant letters. Vowel signs in Malayalam usually sit adjacent to its base consonant - below, to the left, right, or both left and right, but are always pronounced after the consonant sound. Some vowel signs, such as Ū, can also form a ligature with some consonants, although this is much more common in old-style paḻaya lipi texts than in the modern reformed paḻaya lipi orthography.

Malayalam Ū vowel sign on ക, ഖ, ഗ, ഘ, & ങ: Kū, Khū, Gū, Ghū and Ngū in paḻaya lipi.

== Odia Ū ==
Odia independent vowel and vowel sign Ū.

Ū (ଊ) is a vowel of the Odia abugida. It ultimately arose from the Brahmi letter, via the Siddhaṃ letter uu. Like in other Indic scripts, Odia vowels have two forms: an independent letter for word and syllable-initial vowel sounds, and a vowel sign for changing the inherent "a" of consonant letters. Vowel signs in Odia usually sit adjacent to its base consonant - below, to the left, right, or both left and right, but are always pronounced after the consonant sound. No base consonants are altered in form when adding a vowel sign, and there are no consonant+vowel ligatures in Odia.

== Kaithi Ū ==
Kaithi independent vowel and vowel sign Ū.

Ū (𑂈) is a vowel of the Kaithi abugida. It ultimately arose from the Brahmi letter, via the Siddhaṃ letter Uu. Like in other Indic scripts, Kaithi vowels have two forms: an independent letter for word and syllable-initial vowel sounds, and a vowel sign for changing the inherent "a" of consonant letters. Vowel signs in Kaithi usually sit adjacent to its base consonant - below, to the left, right, or both left and right, but are always pronounced after the consonant sound. No base consonants are altered in form when adding a vowel sign, and there are no consonant+vowel ligatures in Kaithi.

== Tirhuta Ū ==
Tirhuta independent vowel and vowel sign Ū.

Ū (𑒆) is a vowel of the Tirhuta abugida. It ultimately arose from the Brahmi letter, via the Siddhaṃ letter Uu. Like in other Indic scripts, Tirhuta vowels have two forms: an independent letter for word and syllable-initial vowel sounds, and a vowel sign for changing the inherent "a" of consonant letters. Vowel signs in Tirhuta usually sit adjacent to its base consonant - below, to the left, right, or both left and right, but are always pronounced after the consonant sound. Several consonants are altered in form when adding the Ū vowel mark, unlike most Tirhuta vowels.

=== Conjuncts of 𑒆 ===
As is common in Indic scripts, Tirhuta joins letters together to form ligatures and conjuncts. Unlike most Indic scripts, Tirhuta not only has ligatures and conjuncts of consonant clusters, but also forms ligatures of consonants + vowel marks. Ū (𑒆) is one of the vowels that form ligatures with some consonants.

- 𑒦୍ (bʰ) + 𑒆 (ū) gives the ligature bʰū:

- 𑒡୍ (dʱ) + 𑒆 (ū) gives the ligature dʱū:

- 𑒯୍ (h) + 𑒆 (ū) gives the ligature hū:

- 𑒏୍ (k) + 𑒆 (ū) gives the ligature kū:

- 𑒩୍ (r) + 𑒆 (ū) gives the ligature rū:

- 𑒞୍ (t) + 𑒆 (ū) gives the ligature tū:

== Comparison of Ū ==
The various Indic scripts are generally related to each other through adaptation and borrowing, and as such the glyphs for cognate letters, including Ū, are related as well.

Comparison of Ū in different scripts

Aramaic
Kharoṣṭhī -	Ashoka Brahmi / 𑀽	Kushana Brahmi (Note: The middle "Kushana" form of Brahmi is a later style that emerged as Brahmi scripts were beginning to proliferate. Gupta Brahmi was definitely a stylistic descendant from Kushana, but other Brahmi-derived scripts may have descended from earlier forms.) 𑀊 / 𑀽	Tocharian (Note: Tocharian is probably derived from the middle period "Kushana" form of Brahmi, although artifacts from that time are not plentiful enough to establish a definite succession.) -
Gupta Brahmi 𑀊 / 𑀽	Pallava -
Kadamba -
Bhaiksuki 𑰅 / 𑰳	Siddhaṃ / 𑖳	Grantha 𑌊 / 𑍂	Cham -
Sinhala ඌ / ූ	Pyu / Old Mon (Note: Pyu and Old Mon are probably the precursors of the Burmese script, and may be derived from either the Pallava or Kadamba script) -
Tibetan ཨཱུ	Newa 𑐅 / 𑐹	Ahom 𑜥	Malayalam ഊ / ൂ
Telugu ఊ / ూ	Burmese ဦ / ူ
Lepcha ᰫ	Ranjana	Saurashtra ꢇ / ꢹ	Dives Akuru 𑤅 / 𑤴
Kannada ಊ / ೂ	Kayah Li -
Limbu -	Soyombo (Note: May also be derived from Devangari (see bottom left of table)) 𑩓𑩛	Khmer ឩ / ូ	Tamil ஊ / ூ
Chakma 𑄫	Tai Tham ᩐ / ᩪ
Meitei Mayek ꫬ	Gaudi -	Thai ู	Lao ູ
Tai Le -
Marchen -	Tirhuta 𑒆 / 𑒴	New Tai Lue ᦴ	Tai Viet -	Aksara Kawi 𑼉 / 𑼹
'Phags-pa -	Odia ଊ / ୂ	Sharada 𑆈 / 𑆷	Rejang -	Batak -	Buginese -
Zanabazar Square -	Bengali–Assamese ঊ / ূ	Takri 𑚅 / 𑚱	Javanese ꦉ / ꦹ	Balinese ᬊ / ᬹ	Makasar -
Hangul (Note: The Origin of Hangul from 'Phags-pa is one of limited influence, inspiring at most a few basic letter shapes. Hangul does not function as an Indic abugida.) -	Northern Nagari -	Dogri 𑠅 / 𑠰	Laṇḍā -	Sundanese -	Baybayin -
Modi 𑘅 / 𑘴	Gujarati ઊ / ૂ	Khojki -	Khudabadi 𑊵 / 𑋤	Mahajani -	Tagbanwa -
Devanagari ऊ / ू	Nandinagari 𑦥 / 𑧕	Kaithi / 𑂴	Gurmukhi ਊ / ੂ	Multani -	Buhid -
Canadian Syllabics (Note: Although the basic letter forms of the Canadian Aboriginal Syllabics were derived from handwritten Devanagari letters, this abugida indicates vowel sounds by rotations of the letter form, rather than the use of vowel diacritics as is standard in Indic abugidas.) -	Soyombo (Note: May also be derived from Ranjana (see above)) 𑩓𑩛	Sylheti Nagari -	Gunjala Gondi 𑵥 / 𑶎	Masaram Gondi (Note: Masaram Gondi acts as an Indic abugida, but its letterforms were not derived from any single precursor script.) 𑴅 / 𑴵	Hanuno'o -

== Character encodings of Ū ==
Most Indic scripts are encoded in the Unicode Standard, and as such the letter Ū in those scripts can be represented in plain text with unique codepoint. Ū from several modern-use scripts can also be found in legacy encodings, such as ISCII.

Character information
Preview	ऊ		ঊ		ஊ		ఊ		ଊ		ಊ		ഊ		ઊ		ਊ	
Unicode name	DEVANAGARI LETTER UU		BENGALI LETTER UU		TAMIL LETTER UU		TELUGU LETTER UU		ORIYA LETTER UU		KANNADA LETTER UU		MALAYALAM LETTER UU		GUJARATI LETTER UU		GURMUKHI LETTER UU	
Encodings	decimal	hex	dec	hex	dec	hex	dec	hex	dec	hex	dec	hex	dec	hex	dec	hex	dec	hex
Unicode	2314	U+090A	2442	U+098A	2954	U+0B8A	3082	U+0C0A	2826	U+0B0A	3210	U+0C8A	3338	U+0D0A	2698	U+0A8A	2570	U+0A0A
UTF-8	224 164 138	E0 A4 8A	224 166 138	E0 A6 8A	224 174 138	E0 AE 8A	224 176 138	E0 B0 8A	224 172 138	E0 AC 8A	224 178 138	E0 B2 8A	224 180 138	E0 B4 8A	224 170 138	E0 AA 8A	224 168 138	E0 A8 8A
Numeric character reference	&#2314;	&#x90A;	&#2442;	&#x98A;	&#2954;	&#xB8A;	&#3082;	&#xC0A;	&#2826;	&#xB0A;	&#3210;	&#xC8A;	&#3338;	&#xD0A;	&#2698;	&#xA8A;	&#2570;	&#xA0A;
ISCII	169	A9	169	A9	169	A9	169	A9	169	A9	169	A9	169	A9	169	A9	169	A9

Character information
Preview	Ashoka Kushana Gupta				𑌊	
Unicode name	BRAHMI LETTER UU		SIDDHAM LETTER UU		GRANTHA LETTER UU	
Encodings	decimal	hex	dec	hex	dec	hex
Unicode	69642	U+1100A	71045	U+11585	70410	U+1130A
UTF-8	240 145 128 138	F0 91 80 8A	240 145 150 133	F0 91 96 85	240 145 140 138	F0 91 8C 8A
UTF-16	55300 56330	D804 DC0A	55301 56709	D805 DD85	55300 57098	D804 DF0A
Numeric character reference	&#69642;	&#x1100A;	&#71045;	&#x11585;	&#70410;	&#x1130A;

Character information
Preview	𑐅		𑰅		𑆈	
Unicode name	NEWA LETTER UU		BHAIKSUKI LETTER UU		SHARADA LETTER UU	
Encodings	decimal	hex	dec	hex	dec	hex
Unicode	70661	U+11405	72709	U+11C05	70024	U+11188
UTF-8	240 145 144 133	F0 91 90 85	240 145 176 133	F0 91 B0 85	240 145 134 136	F0 91 86 88
UTF-16	55301 56325	D805 DC05	55303 56325	D807 DC05	55300 56712	D804 DD88
Numeric character reference	&#70661;	&#x11405;	&#72709;	&#x11C05;	&#70024;	&#x11188;

Character information
Preview	ဦ		ᩐ	
Unicode name	MYANMAR LETTER UU		TAI THAM LETTER UU	
Encodings	decimal	hex	dec	hex
Unicode	4134	U+1026	6736	U+1A50
UTF-8	225 128 166	E1 80 A6	225 169 144	E1 A9 90
Numeric character reference	&#4134;	&#x1026;	&#6736;	&#x1A50;

Character information
Preview	ឩ	
Unicode name	KHMER INDEPENDENT VOWEL QUU	
Encodings	decimal	hex
Unicode	6057	U+17A9
UTF-8	225 158 169	E1 9E A9
Numeric character reference	&#6057;	&#x17A9;

Character information
Preview	ඌ		𑤅		ꢇ	
Unicode name	SINHALA LETTER UUYANNA		DIVES AKURU LETTER UU		SAURASHTRA LETTER UU	
Encodings	decimal	hex	dec	hex	dec	hex
Unicode	3468	U+0D8C	71941	U+11905	43143	U+A887
UTF-8	224 182 140	E0 B6 8C	240 145 164 133	F0 91 A4 85	234 162 135	EA A2 87
UTF-16	3468	0D8C	55302 56581	D806 DD05	43143	A887
Numeric character reference	&#3468;	&#xD8C;	&#71941;	&#x11905;	&#43143;	&#xA887;

Character information
Preview	𑘅		𑦥		𑵥			
Unicode name	MODI LETTER UU		NANDINAGARI LETTER UU		GUNJALA GONDI LETTER UU		KAITHI LETTER UU	
Encodings	decimal	hex	dec	hex	dec	hex	dec	hex
Unicode	71173	U+11605	72101	U+119A5	73061	U+11D65	69768	U+11088
UTF-8	240 145 152 133	F0 91 98 85	240 145 166 165	F0 91 A6 A5	240 145 181 165	F0 91 B5 A5	240 145 130 136	F0 91 82 88
UTF-16	55301 56837	D805 DE05	55302 56741	D806 DDA5	55303 56677	D807 DD65	55300 56456	D804 DC88
Numeric character reference	&#71173;	&#x11605;	&#72101;	&#x119A5;	&#73061;	&#x11D65;	&#69768;	&#x11088;

Character information
Preview	𑒆	
Unicode name	TIRHUTA LETTER UU	
Encodings	decimal	hex
Unicode	70790	U+11486
UTF-8	240 145 146 134	F0 91 92 86
UTF-16	55301 56454	D805 DC86
Numeric character reference	&#70790;	&#x11486;

Character information
Preview	𑚅		𑠅		𑊵	
Unicode name	TAKRI LETTER UU		DOGRA LETTER UU		KHUDAWADI LETTER UU	
Encodings	decimal	hex	dec	hex	dec	hex
Unicode	71301	U+11685	71685	U+11805	70325	U+112B5
UTF-8	240 145 154 133	F0 91 9A 85	240 145 160 133	F0 91 A0 85	240 145 138 181	F0 91 8A B5
UTF-16	55301 56965	D805 DE85	55302 56325	D806 DC05	55300 57013	D804 DEB5
Numeric character reference	&#71301;	&#x11685;	&#71685;	&#x11805;	&#70325;	&#x112B5;

Character information
Preview	ᬊ	
Unicode name	BALINESE LETTER UKARA TEDUNG	
Encodings	decimal	hex
Unicode	6922	U+1B0A
UTF-8	225 172 138	E1 AC 8A
Numeric character reference	&#6922;	&#x1B0A;

Character information
Preview	𑴅	
Unicode name	MASARAM GONDI LETTER UU	
Encodings	decimal	hex
Unicode	72965	U+11D05
UTF-8	240 145 180 133	F0 91 B4 85
UTF-16	55303 56581	D807 DD05
Numeric character reference	&#72965;	&#x11D05;
