= E (Indic) =

Letter "E" in Indic scripts

Example glyphs
- Bengali–Assamese: এ
- Tibetan: ཨེ
- Tamil: ஏ
- Thai: เ
- Malayalam: എ
- Sinhala: එ
- Ashoka Brahmi: E
- Devanagari: ए

Properties
- Phonemic representation: /eː/
- IAST transliteration: e E
- ISCII code point: AC (172)

E is a vowel of Indic abugidas. In modern Indic scripts, E is derived from the early "Ashoka" Brahmi letter after having gone through the Gupta letter. As an Indic vowel, E comes in two normally distinct forms: 1) as an independent letter, and 2) as a vowel sign for modifying a base consonant. Bare consonants without a modifying vowel sign have the inherent "A" vowel.

== Āryabhaṭa numeration ==
Aryabhata used Devanagari letters for numbers, very similar to the Greek numerals, even after the invention of Indian numerals. The े sign was used to modify a consonant's value ×10^{10}, but the vowel letter ए did not have an inherent value by itself.

== Historic Ē ==
There are three different general early historic scripts - Brahmi and its variants, Kharoṣṭhī, and Tocharian, the so-called slanting Brahmi. E as found in standard Brahmi, was a simple geometric shape, and remained basically unchanged all the way through the generally more flowing Gupta as. Like all Brahmic scripts, Tocharian E has an accompanying vowel mark for modifying a base consonant. In Kharoṣṭhī, the only independent vowel letter is for the inherent A. All other independent vowels, including E are indicated with vowel marks added to the letter A.

=== Brahmi Ē ===
The Brahmi letter E, is probably derived from the Aramaic Ayin, and is thus related to the modern Latin O and Greek Omicron. Several identifiable styles of writing the Brahmi E can be found, most associated with a specific set of inscriptions from an artifact or diverse records from an historic period. As the earliest and most geometric style of Brahmi, the letters found on the Edicts of Ashoka and other records from around that time are normally the reference form for Brahmi letters, with some vowel marks not attested until later forms of Brahmi back-formed to match the geometric writing style.

Brahmi E historic forms
Ashoka (3rd-1st c. BCE)	Girnar (~150 BCE)	Kushana (~150-250 CE)	Gujarat (~250 CE)	Gupta (~350 CE)

=== Tocharian Ē ===
The Tocharian letter is derived from the Brahmi. Unlike some of the consonants, Tocharian vowels do not have a Fremdzeichen form.

Tocharian consonants with E vowel marks
Ke	Khe	Ge	Ghe	Ce	Che	Je	Jhe	Nye	Ṭe	Ṭhe	Ḍe	Ḍhe	Ṇe
Te	The	De	Dhe	Ne	Pe	Phe	Be	Bhe	Me	Ye	Re	Le	Ve
Śe	Ṣe	Se	He										

=== Kharoṣṭhī E ===
The Kharoṣṭhī letter E is indicated with the vowel mark. As an independent vowel, E is indicated by adding the vowel mark to the independent vowel letter A.

== Devanagari Ē ==
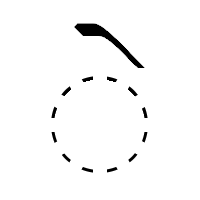
Devanagari independent Ē and Ē vowel sign.

Ē (ए) is a vowel of the Devanagari abugida. It ultimately arose from the Brahmi letter, after having gone through the Gupta letter. Letters that derive from it are the Gujarati letter એ, and the Modi letter 𑘊.

=== Devanagari Using Languages ===
The Devanagari script is used to write the Hindi language, Sanskrit and the majority of Indo-Aryan languages. In most of these languages, ए is pronounced as [e]. Like all Indic scripts, Devanagari vowels come in two forms: an independent vowel form for syllables that begin with a vowel sound, and a vowel sign attached to base consonant to override the inherent /ə/ vowel.

== Bengali Ē ==
Bengali independent Ē and Ē vowel sign.

Ē (এ) is a vowel of the Bengali abugida. It is derived from the Siddhaṃ letter, and is marked by the lack of horizontal head line and less geometric shape than its Devanagari counterpart, ए.

=== Bengali Script Using Languages ===
The Bengali script is used to write several languages of eastern India, notably the Bengali language and Assamese. In most languages, এ is pronounced as [e]. Like all Indic scripts, Bengali vowels come in two forms: an independent vowel form for syllables that begin with a vowel sound, and a vowel sign attached to base consonant to override the inherent /ɔ/ vowel.

== Gujarati Ē ==
Gujarati independent E and E vowel sign.

Ē (એ) is a vowel of the Gujarati abugida. It is derived from the Devanagari Ē, and ultimately the Brahmi letter.

=== Gujarati-using Languages ===
The Gujarati script is used to write the Gujarati and Kutchi languages. In both languages, એ is pronounced as [e]. Like all Indic scripts, Gujarati vowels come in two forms: an independent vowel form for syllables that begin with a vowel sound, and a vowel sign attached to base consonant to override the inherent /ə/ vowel.

=== Gujarati Candra E ===
Gujarati independent Candra E and Candra E vowel sign.

Candra E (ઍ short E) is a vowel of the Gujarati abugida. It is derived from the Devanagari Candra E, and ultimately the Brahmi letter.

==== Gujarati-using Languages ====
The Gujarati script is used to write the Gujarati and Kutchi languages. In both languages, ઍ is pronounced as [ɛ]. Like all Indic scripts, Gujarati vowels come in two forms: an independent vowel form for syllables that begin with a vowel sound, and a vowel sign attached to base consonant to override the inherent /ə/ vowel.

== Javanese E ==
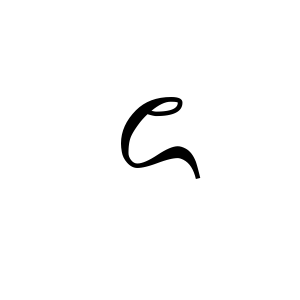
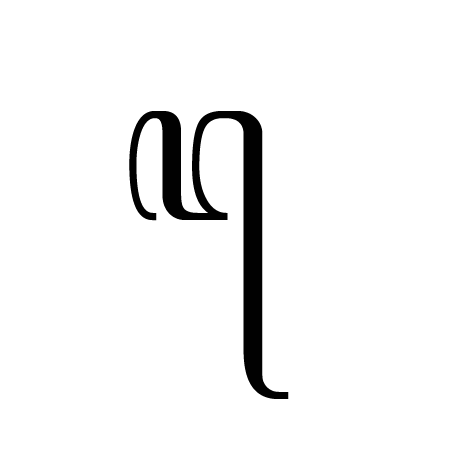
Javanese independent vowel and vowel sign E.

In the Javanese script, the subjunct letter of /e/ is also known as taling.

== Telugu E ==
Telugu independent vowel and vowel sign E.

E (ఎ) is a vowel of the Telugu abugida. It ultimately arose from the Brahmi letter. It is closely related to the Kannada letter ಎ. Like in other Indic scripts, Telugu vowels have two forms: and independent letter for word and syllable-initial vowel sounds, and a vowel sign for changing the inherent "a" of Telugu consonant letters. Vowel signs in Telugu can interact with a base consonant in one of three ways: 1) the vowel sign touches or sits adjacent to the base consonant without modifying the shape of either 2) the vowel sign sits directly above the consonant, replacing its v-shaped headline, 3) the vowel sign and consonant interact, forming a ligature.

Telugu E vowel sign on క, ఖ, గ, ఘ & ఙ: Ke, Khe, Ge, Ghe and Nge. Note that how the vowel sign interacts with the base consonant is dependent on the location of the headline, the absence of a headline, and the presence of a tail to attach to.

=== Telugu Ē ===
Telugu independent Ē vowel and vowel sign .

In addition, Telugu also contains a second E vowel, Ē (ఏ). It is also derived from the Brahmi letter. It is closely related to the Kannada letter ಏ. The long Ē vowel sign interacts with base consonants the same as the short E.

Telugu vowel sign on క, ఖ, గ, ఘ & ఙ: Kē, Khē, Gē, Ghē and Ngē. Note that how the vowel sign interacts with the base consonant is dependent on the location of the headline, the absence of a headline, and the presence of a tail to attach to.

== Malayalam E ==
Malayalam independent vowel and vowel sign E.

E (എ) is a vowel of the Malayalam abugida. It ultimately arose from the Brahmi letter, via the Grantha letter e. Like in other Indic scripts, Malayalam vowels have two forms: an independent letter for word and syllable-initial vowel sounds, and a vowel sign for changing the inherent "a" of consonant letters. Vowel signs in Malayalam usually sit adjacent to its base consonant - below, to the left, right, or both left and right, but are always pronounced after the consonant sound.

=== Malayalam Ē ===
Malayalam independent vowel and vowel sign Ē.

Ē (ഏ, Long E) is a vowel of the Malayalam abugida. It is ultimately a derivation of a predecessor to Malayalam short "E" that arose after Grantha. Like other Malayalam vowels, Ē has two forms: an independent letter for word and syllable-initial vowel sounds, and a vowel sign for changing the inherent "a" of consonant letters. Vowel signs in Malayalam usually sit adjacent to its base consonant - below, to the left, right, or both left and right, but are always pronounced after the consonant sound.

== Canadian Aboriginal Syllabics Vowels ==
ᐁ, ᐃ, ᐅ and ᐊ are the bare vowel characters in the Canadian Aboriginal Syllabics. ᐞ is derived from the vowel series, and has the value of a glottal stop. Unlike the bare-consonant forms of most Canadian syllabic letters that are a small version of the A-series letter, ᐞ is a small version of the I-series ᐃ. The base character ᐁ is derived from a handwritten form of the Devanagari letter ए. Unlike most writing systems without legacy computer encodings, complex Canadian syllabic letters are represented in Unicode with pre-composed characters, rather than with base characters and diacritical marks.

Variant	E-series		I-series			O-series			A-series			Other
Bare vowels	ᐁ		ᐃ			ᐅ			ᐊ			-
Bare vowels	E		I			O			A			-
Small	-		ᐞ	ᣜ	ᣝ	-			-			ᐜ
Small	-		ʔ	Eastern W	Western W	-			-			Ai
Long vowels	-		ᐄ			ᐆ	ᐇ		ᐋ			
Long vowels	-		Ī			Ō	Cree Ō		Ā			
W- vowels	ᐌ	ᐍ	ᐎ		ᐏ	ᐒ	ᐓ		ᐗ	ᐘ		-
W- vowels	We	Cree We	Wi		Cree Wi	Wo	Cree Wo		Wa	Cree Wa		-
W- long vowels	-		ᐐ		ᐑ	ᐔ	ᐕ	ᐖ	ᐙ	ᐚ	ᐛ	-
W- long vowels	-		Wī		Cree Wī	Wō	Cree Wō	Naskapi Wō	Wā	Cree Wā	Naskapi Wā	-
Carrier vowels	ᐈ		ᐉ			-			-			-
Carrier vowels	Ē		I			-			-			-
Vowels with ring diacritic	-		ᐂ			ᢰ			ᢱ	ᢲ	ᢳ	-
Vowels with ring diacritic	-		Āi			Oy			Ay	Āy	Way	-

== Odia E ==
Odia independent vowel and vowel sign E

E (ଏ) is a vowel of the Odia abugida. It ultimately arose from the Brahmi letter, via the Siddhaṃ letter e. Like in other Indic scripts, Odia vowels have two forms: an independent letter for word and syllable-initial vowel sounds, and a vowel sign for changing the inherent "a" of consonant letters. Vowel signs in Odia usually sit adjacent to its base consonant - below, to the left, right, or both left and right, but are always pronounced after the consonant sound. No base consonants are altered in form when adding a vowel sign, and there are no consonant+vowel ligatures in Odia.

== Kaithi E ==
Kaithi independent vowel and vowel sign E.

E (𑂉) is a vowel of the Kaithi abugida. It ultimately arose from the Brahmi letter, via the Siddhaṃ letter E. Like in other Indic scripts, Kaithi vowels have two forms: an independent letter for word and syllable-initial vowel sounds, and a vowel sign for changing the inherent "a" of consonant letters. Vowel signs in Kaithi usually sit adjacent to its base consonant - below, to the left, right, or both left and right, but are always pronounced after the consonant sound. No base consonants are altered in form when adding a vowel sign, and there are no consonant+vowel ligatures in Kaithi.

== Tirhuta E ==
Tirhuta independent vowel and vowel sign E.

E (𑒋) is a vowel of the Tirhuta abugida. It ultimately arose from the Brahmi letter, via the Siddhaṃ letter E. Like in other Indic scripts, Tirhuta vowels have two forms: an independent letter for word and syllable-initial vowel sounds, and a vowel sign for changing the inherent "a" of consonant letters. Vowel signs in Tirhuta usually sit adjacent to its base consonant - below, to the left, right, or both left and right, but are always pronounced after the consonant sound. No consonants are altered in form when adding the E vowel mark, although there are some consonant+vowel ligatures in Tirhuta.

== Comparison of E ==
The various Indic scripts are generally related to each other through adaptation and borrowing, and as such the glyphs for cognate letters, including E, are related as well.

Comparison of E in different scripts

Aramaic
Kharoṣṭhī 𐨅	Ashoka Brahmi / 𑁂	Kushana Brahmi (Note: The middle "Kushana" form of Brahmi is a later style that emerged as Brahmi scripts were beginning to proliferate. Gupta Brahmi was definitely a stylistic descendant from Kushana, but other Brahmi-derived scripts may have descended from earlier forms.) / 𑁂	Tocharian (Note: Tocharian is probably derived from the middle period "Kushana" form of Brahmi, although artifacts from that time are not plentiful enough to establish a definite succession.)
Gupta Brahmi / 𑁂	Pallava
Kadamba -
Bhaiksuki 𑰊 / 𑰸	Siddhaṃ / 𑖸	Grantha 𑌏 / 𑍇	Cham ꨃ / ꨮ
Sinhala එ / ෙ	Pyu / Old Mon (Note: Pyu and Old Mon are probably the precursors of the Burmese script, and may be derived from either the Pallava or Kadamba script) -
Tibetan ེ	Newa 𑐊 / 𑐹	Ahom 𑜦	Malayalam ഏ / േ
Telugu ఏ / ే	Burmese ဧ / ေ
Lepcha ᰬ	Ranjana	Saurashtra ꢌ / ꢾ	Dives Akuru 𑤆 / 𑤵
Kannada ಏ / ೇ	Kayah Li ꤧ
Limbu ᤧ	Soyombo (Note: May also be derived from Devangari (see bottom left of table)) 𑩔	Khmer ឯ / េ	Tamil ஏ / ே
Chakma 𑄆	Tai Tham ᩑ / ᩮ
Meitei Mayek ꫠ / ꯦ	Gaudi -	Thai เ	Lao ເ
Tai Le ᥫ
Marchen 𑲳	Tirhuta 𑒋 / 𑒹	New Tai Lue ᦵ	Tai Viet ꪹ	Aksara Kawi 𑼎 / 𑼾
'Phags-pa ꡠ	Odia ଏ / େ	Sharada 𑆍 / 𑆼	Rejang ꥉ	Batak ᯩ / ᯧ / ᯨ	Buginese ᨙ
Zanabazar Square 𑨄	Bengali–Assamese এ / ে	Takri 𑚆 / 𑚲	Javanese ꦌ / ꦺ	Balinese ᬏ / ᬾ	Makasar 𑻵
Hangul (Note: The Origin of Hangul from 'Phags-pa is one of limited influence, inspiring at most a few basic letter shapes. Hangul does not function as an Indic abugida.) ㅔ	Northern Nagari -	Dogri 𑠆 / 𑠳	Laṇḍā -	Sundanese ᮈ / ᮨ	Baybayin -
Modi 𑘊 / 𑘹	Gujarati એ / ે	Khojki 𑈄 / 𑈰	Khudabadi 𑊶 / 𑋥	Mahajani 𑅓	Tagbanwa -
Devanagari ए / े	Nandinagari 𑦪 / 𑧚	Kaithi / 𑂵	Gurmukhi ਏ / ੇ	Multani 𑊃	Buhid -
Canadian Syllabics (Note: Although the basic letter forms of the Canadian Aboriginal Syllabics were derived from handwritten Devanagari letters, this abugida indicates vowel sounds by rotations of the letter form, rather than the use of vowel diacritics as is standard in Indic abugidas.) ᐁ	Soyombo (Note: May also be derived from Ranjana (see above)) 𑩔	Sylheti Nagari ꠄ / ꠦ	Gunjala Gondi 𑵧 / 𑶐	Masaram Gondi (Note: Masaram Gondi acts as an Indic abugida, but its letterforms were not derived from any single precursor script.) 𑴆 / 𑴺	Hanuno'o -

== Character encodings of E ==
Most Indic scripts are encoded in the Unicode Standard, and as such the letter E in those scripts can be represented in plain text with unique codepoint. E from several modern-use scripts can also be found in legacy encodings, such as ISCII.

Character information
Preview	ए		এ		ஏ		ఏ		ଏ		ಏ		ഏ		એ		ਏ	
Unicode name	DEVANAGARI LETTER E		BENGALI LETTER E		TAMIL LETTER EE		TELUGU LETTER EE		ORIYA LETTER E		KANNADA LETTER EE		MALAYALAM LETTER EE		GUJARATI LETTER E		GURMUKHI LETTER EE	
Encodings	decimal	hex	dec	hex	dec	hex	dec	hex	dec	hex	dec	hex	dec	hex	dec	hex	dec	hex
Unicode	2319	U+090F	2447	U+098F	2959	U+0B8F	3087	U+0C0F	2831	U+0B0F	3215	U+0C8F	3343	U+0D0F	2703	U+0A8F	2575	U+0A0F
UTF-8	224 164 143	E0 A4 8F	224 166 143	E0 A6 8F	224 174 143	E0 AE 8F	224 176 143	E0 B0 8F	224 172 143	E0 AC 8F	224 178 143	E0 B2 8F	224 180 143	E0 B4 8F	224 170 143	E0 AA 8F	224 168 143	E0 A8 8F
Numeric character reference	&#2319;	&#x90F;	&#2447;	&#x98F;	&#2959;	&#xB8F;	&#3087;	&#xC0F;	&#2831;	&#xB0F;	&#3215;	&#xC8F;	&#3343;	&#xD0F;	&#2703;	&#xA8F;	&#2575;	&#xA0F;
ISCII	172	AC	172	AC	172	AC	172	AC	172	AC	172	AC	172	AC	172	AC	172	AC

Character information
Preview	Ashoka Kushana Gupta				𑌏	
Unicode name	BRAHMI LETTER E		SIDDHAM LETTER E		GRANTHA LETTER EE	
Encodings	decimal	hex	dec	hex	dec	hex
Unicode	69647	U+1100F	71050	U+1158A	70415	U+1130F
UTF-8	240 145 128 143	F0 91 80 8F	240 145 150 138	F0 91 96 8A	240 145 140 143	F0 91 8C 8F
UTF-16	55300 56335	D804 DC0F	55301 56714	D805 DD8A	55300 57103	D804 DF0F
Numeric character reference	&#69647;	&#x1100F;	&#71050;	&#x1158A;	&#70415;	&#x1130F;

Character information
Preview	ꡠ		𑐊		𑰊		𑆍	
Unicode name	PHAGS-PA LETTER E		NEWA LETTER E		BHAIKSUKI LETTER E		SHARADA LETTER E	
Encodings	decimal	hex	dec	hex	dec	hex	dec	hex
Unicode	43104	U+A860	70666	U+1140A	72714	U+11C0A	70029	U+1118D
UTF-8	234 161 160	EA A1 A0	240 145 144 138	F0 91 90 8A	240 145 176 138	F0 91 B0 8A	240 145 134 141	F0 91 86 8D
UTF-16	43104	A860	55301 56330	D805 DC0A	55303 56330	D807 DC0A	55300 56717	D804 DD8D
Numeric character reference	&#43104;	&#xA860;	&#70666;	&#x1140A;	&#72714;	&#x11C0A;	&#70029;	&#x1118D;

Character information
Preview	ဧ		ᦵ	
Unicode name	MYANMAR LETTER E		NEW TAI LUE VOWEL SIGN E	
Encodings	decimal	hex	dec	hex
Unicode	4135	U+1027	6581	U+19B5
UTF-8	225 128 167	E1 80 A7	225 166 181	E1 A6 B5
Numeric character reference	&#4135;	&#x1027;	&#6581;	&#x19B5;

Character information
Preview	ឯ		เ		ꪵ	
Unicode name	KHMER INDEPENDENT VOWEL QE		THAI CHARACTER SARA E		TAI VIET VOWEL E	
Encodings	decimal	hex	dec	hex	dec	hex
Unicode	6063	U+17AF	3648	U+0E40	43701	U+AAB5
UTF-8	225 158 175	E1 9E AF	224 185 128	E0 B9 80	234 170 181	EA AA B5
Numeric character reference	&#6063;	&#x17AF;	&#3648;	&#xE40;	&#43701;	&#xAAB5;

Character information
Preview	එ		𑄆		ᥫ		𑤆		ꢌ		ꨃ	
Unicode name	SINHALA LETTER EYANNA		CHAKMA LETTER E		TAI LE LETTER E		DIVES AKURU LETTER E		SAURASHTRA LETTER E		CHAM LETTER E	
Encodings	decimal	hex	dec	hex	dec	hex	dec	hex	dec	hex	dec	hex
Unicode	3473	U+0D91	69894	U+11106	6507	U+196B	71942	U+11906	43148	U+A88C	43523	U+AA03
UTF-8	224 182 145	E0 B6 91	240 145 132 134	F0 91 84 86	225 165 171	E1 A5 AB	240 145 164 134	F0 91 A4 86	234 162 140	EA A2 8C	234 168 131	EA A8 83
UTF-16	3473	0D91	55300 56582	D804 DD06	6507	196B	55302 56582	D806 DD06	43148	A88C	43523	AA03
Numeric character reference	&#3473;	&#xD91;	&#69894;	&#x11106;	&#6507;	&#x196B;	&#71942;	&#x11906;	&#43148;	&#xA88C;	&#43523;	&#xAA03;

Character information
Preview	𑘊		𑦪	
Unicode name	MODI LETTER E		NANDINAGARI LETTER E	
Encodings	decimal	hex	dec	hex
Unicode	71178	U+1160A	72106	U+119AA
UTF-8	240 145 152 138	F0 91 98 8A	240 145 166 170	F0 91 A6 AA
UTF-16	55301 56842	D805 DE0A	55302 56746	D806 DDAA
Numeric character reference	&#71178;	&#x1160A;	&#72106;	&#x119AA;

Character information
Preview	𑒋		ꫠ	
Unicode name	TIRHUTA LETTER E		MEETEI MAYEK LETTER E	
Encodings	decimal	hex	dec	hex
Unicode	70795	U+1148B	43744	U+AAE0
UTF-8	240 145 146 139	F0 91 92 8B	234 171 160	EA AB A0
UTF-16	55301 56459	D805 DC8B	43744	AAE0
Numeric character reference	&#70795;	&#x1148B;	&#43744;	&#xAAE0;

Character information
Preview	𑚆		𑠆		𑈄		𑊶		𑅓		𑊃	
Unicode name	TAKRI LETTER E		DOGRA LETTER E		KHOJKI LETTER E		KHUDAWADI LETTER E		MAHAJANI LETTER E		MULTANI LETTER E	
Encodings	decimal	hex	dec	hex	dec	hex	dec	hex	dec	hex	dec	hex
Unicode	71302	U+11686	71686	U+11806	70148	U+11204	70326	U+112B6	69971	U+11153	70275	U+11283
UTF-8	240 145 154 134	F0 91 9A 86	240 145 160 134	F0 91 A0 86	240 145 136 132	F0 91 88 84	240 145 138 182	F0 91 8A B6	240 145 133 147	F0 91 85 93	240 145 138 131	F0 91 8A 83
UTF-16	55301 56966	D805 DE86	55302 56326	D806 DC06	55300 56836	D804 DE04	55300 57014	D804 DEB6	55300 56659	D804 DD53	55300 56963	D804 DE83
Numeric character reference	&#71302;	&#x11686;	&#71686;	&#x11806;	&#70148;	&#x11204;	&#70326;	&#x112B6;	&#69971;	&#x11153;	&#70275;	&#x11283;

Character information
Preview	ᬏ		ꦌ		ᮈ	
Unicode name	BALINESE LETTER EKARA		JAVANESE LETTER E		SUNDANESE LETTER E	
Encodings	decimal	hex	dec	hex	dec	hex
Unicode	6927	U+1B0F	43404	U+A98C	7048	U+1B88
UTF-8	225 172 143	E1 AC 8F	234 166 140	EA A6 8C	225 174 136	E1 AE 88
Numeric character reference	&#6927;	&#x1B0F;	&#43404;	&#xA98C;	&#7048;	&#x1B88;

Character information
Preview	𑴆	
Unicode name	MASARAM GONDI LETTER E	
Encodings	decimal	hex
Unicode	72966	U+11D06
UTF-8	240 145 180 134	F0 91 B4 86
UTF-16	55303 56582	D807 DD06
Numeric character reference	&#72966;	&#x11D06;

Character information
Preview	ᐁ		ᐃ		ᐅ		ᐊ		ᐞ	
Unicode name	CANADIAN SYLLABICS E		CANADIAN SYLLABICS I		CANADIAN SYLLABICS O		CANADIAN SYLLABICS A		CANADIAN SYLLABICS GLOTTAL STOP	
Encodings	decimal	hex	dec	hex	dec	hex	dec	hex	dec	hex
Unicode	5121	U+1401	5123	U+1403	5125	U+1405	5130	U+140A	5150	U+141E
UTF-8	225 144 129	E1 90 81	225 144 131	E1 90 83	225 144 133	E1 90 85	225 144 138	E1 90 8A	225 144 158	E1 90 9E
Numeric character reference	&#5121;	&#x1401;	&#5123;	&#x1403;	&#5125;	&#x1405;	&#5130;	&#x140A;	&#5150;	&#x141E;

- The full range of E Canadian syllabic characters can be found at the codepoint ranges 1401-141B, 141E, 142B-142E, 18B0-18B3, 18DC-18DD.
