= Indian Script Code for Information Interchange =

Coding scheme for Indian writing systems

Indian Script Code for Information Interchange (ISCII) is a coding scheme for representing various writing systems of India. It encodes the main Indic scripts and a Roman transliteration. The supported scripts are: Bengali–Assamese, Devanagari, Gujarati, Gurmukhi, Kannada, Malayalam, Odia, Tamil, and Telugu. ISCII does not encode the writing systems of India that are based on Persian, but its writing system switching codes nonetheless provide for Kashmiri, Sindhi, Urdu, Persian, Pashto and Arabic. The Persian-based writing systems were subsequently encoded in the PASCII encoding.

ISCII has not been widely used outside certain government institutions, although a variant without the ATR mechanism was used on classic Mac OS, Mac OS Devanagari, and it has now been rendered largely obsolete by Unicode. Unicode uses a separate block for each Indic writing system, and largely preserves the ISCII layout within each block.

== Background ==
The Brahmi-derived writing systems have similar structure. So ISCII encodes letters with the same phonetic value at the same code point, overlaying the various scripts. For example, the ISCII codes 0xB3 0xDB represent [ki]. This will be rendered as കി in Malayalam, कि in Devanagari, as ਕਿ in Gurmukhi, and as கி in Tamil. The writing system can be selected in rich text by markup or in plain text by means of the ATR code described below.

One motivation for the use of a single encoding is the idea that it will allow easy transliteration from one writing system to another. However, there are enough incompatibilities that this is not really a practical idea.

ISCII is an 8-bit encoding. The lower 128 code points are plain ASCII, the upper 128 code points are ISCII-specific. In addition to the code points representing characters, ISCII makes use of a code point with mnemonic ATR that indicates that the following byte contains one of two kinds of information. One set of values changes the writing system until the next writing system indicator or end-of-line. Another set of values select display modes such as bold and italic. ISCII does not provide a means of indicating the default writing system.

== Code page layout ==
The following table shows the character set for Devanagari. The code sets for Assamese, Bengali, Gujarati, Gurmukhi, Kannada, Malayalam, Oriya, Tamil, and Telugu are similar, with each Devanagari form replaced by the equivalent form in each writing system. Each character is shown with its decimal code and its Unicode equivalent.

ISCII Devanagari
	0	1	2	3	4	5	6	7	8	9	A	B	C	D	E	F
0x	NUL	SOH	STX	ETX	EOT	ENQ	ACK	BEL	BS	HT	LF	VT	FF	CR	SO	SI
1x	DLE	DC1	DC2	DC3	DC4	NAK	SYN	ETB	CAN	EM	SUB	ESC	FS	GS	RS	US
2x	SP	!	"	#	$	%	&	'	(	)	*	+	,	-	.	/
3x	0	1	2	3	4	5	6	7	8	9	:	;	<	=	>	?
4x	@	A	B	C	D	E	F	G	H	I	J	K	L	M	N	O
5x	P	Q	R	S	T	U	V	W	X	Y	Z	[	\	]		_
6x	'	a	b	c	d	e	f	g	h	i	j	k	l	m	n	o
7x	p	q	r	s	t	u	v	w	x	y	z	{	|	}	~	DEL
8x																
9x																
Ax		ँ	ं	ः	अ	आ	इ	ई	उ	ऊ	ऋ	ऎ	ए	ऐ	ऍ	ऒ
Bx	ओ	औ	ऑ	क	ख	ग	घ	ङ	च	छ	ज	झ	ञ	ट	ठ	ड
Cx	ढ	ण	त	थ	द	ध	न	ऩ	प	फ	ब	भ	म	य	य़	र
Dx	ऱ	ल	ळ	ऴ	व	श	ष	स	ह	INV	ा	ि	ी	ु	ू	ृ
Ex	ॆ	े	ै	ॅ	ॊ	ो	ौ	ॉ	्	़	।					ATR
Fx	EXT	०	१	२	३	४	५	६	७	८	९					

Undefined
Lead byte

== Special code points ==
INV character—code point D9 (217)
The INV (invisible consonant) character is used as a pseudo-consonant to display combining elements in isolation. For example, क (ka) + ् (halant) + INV = क्‍ (half ka). The Unicode equivalent is U+200D ZERO WIDTH JOINER (ZWJ). However, as noted below, the ISCII halant character can be doubled or combined with the ISCII nukta to achieve effects created by ZWNJ or ZWJ in Unicode. For this reason, Apple maps the ISCII INV character to the Unicode left-to-right mark, so as to guarantee round-tripping.
ATR character—code point EF (239)
The ATR (attribute) character followed by a byte code is used to switch to a different font attribute (such as bold) or to a different ISCII or PASCII language (such as Bengali), up to the next ATR sequence or the end of the line. This has no direct Unicode equivalent, as font attributes are not part of Unicode, and each script has a distinct set of code points.

Presentational attributes
ATR + byte	Mnemonic	Formatting option
0x30	BLD	Bold
0x31	ITA	Italics
0x32	UL	Underlining
0x33	EXP	Expanded
0x34	HLT	Highlight
0x35	OTL	Outline
0x36	SHD	Shadow
0x37	TOP	Top half of character (used with LOW to create double-height characters)
0x38	LOW	Bottom half of character (used with TOP to create double-height characters)
0x39	DBL	Entire row double-width and double-height

Shifts to ISCII scripts
ATR + byte	Mnemonic	ISCII script
0x40	DEF	Default script (i.e. the script which will be switched back to after a line break)
0x41	RMN	Romanised transliteration
0x42	DEV	Devanagari
0x43	BNG	Bengali script
0x44	TML	Tamil script
0x45	TLG	Telugu script
0x46	ASM	Assamese script
0x47	ORI	Odia script
0x48	KND	Kannada script
0x49	MLM	Malayalam script
0x4A	GJR	Gujarati script
0x4B	PNJ	Gurmukhī

Shifts to PASCII
ATR + byte	Mnemonic	PASCII locale
0x71	ARB	Arabic alphabet
0x72	PES	Persian alphabet
0x73	URD	Urdu alphabet
0x74	SND	Sindhi alphabet
0x75	KSM	Kashmiri alphabet
0x76	PST	Pashto alphabet

EXT character—code point F0 (240)
The EXT (extensions for Vedic) character followed by a byte code indicates a Vedic accent. This has no direct Unicode equivalent, as Vedic accents are assigned to distinct code points.
Halant character ्—code point E8 (232)
The halant character removes the implicit vowel from a consonant and is used between consonants to represent conjunct consonants. For example, क (ka) + ् (halant) + त (ta) = क्त (kta). The sequence ् (halant) + ् (halant) displays a conjunct with an explicit halant, for example क (ka) + ् (halant) + ् (halant) + त (ta) = क्‌त. The sequence ् (halant) + ़ (nukta) displays a conjunct with half consonants, if available, for example क (ka) + ् (halant) + ़ (nukta) + त (ta) = क्‍त.

Correspondences between ISCII and Unicode halent/virama behaviour
ISCII		Unicode	
single halant	E8	halant	094D
halant + halant	E8 E8	halant + ZWNJ	094D 200C
halant + nukta	E8 E9	halant + ZWJ	094D 200D

Nukta character ़—code point E9 (233)
The nukta character after another ISCII character is used for a number of rarer characters which don't exist in the main ISCII set. For example क (ka) + ़ (nukta) = क़ (qa). These characters have precomposed forms in Unicode, as shown in the following table.

Single Unicode characters corresponding to ISCII nukta sequences
ISCII code point	Original character	Character with nukta	Unicode code point
A1 (161)	ँ	ॐ	0950
A6 (166)	इ	ऌ	090C
A7 (167)	ई	ॡ	0961
AA (176)	ऋ	ॠ	0960
B3 (179)	क	क़	0958
B4 (180)	ख	ख़	0959
B5 (181)	ग	ग़	095A
BA (186)	ज	ज़	095B
BF (191)	ड	ड़	095C
C0 (192)	ढ	ढ़	095D
C9 (201)	फ	फ़	095E
DB (219)	ि	ॢ	0962
DC (220)	ी	ॣ	0963
DF (223)	ृ	ॄ	0944
EA (234)	।	ऽ	093D

== Code pages for ISCII conversion ==
To convert from Unicode (UTF-8) to an ISCII / ANSI coding, the following code pages may be used:

- 57002: Devanagari (Hindi, Marathi, Sanskrit, Konkani)
- 57003: Bengali
- 57004: Tamil
- 57005: Telugu
- 57006: Assamese
- 57007: Odia
- 57008: Kannada
- 57009: Malayalam
- 57010: Gujarati
- 57011: Punjabi (Gurmukhi)

== Code points for all languages ==
Code set for all abugidas using ISCII (Note: This table can be derived from the correpsondece by tables 2 and 3 in the ISCII standard here and the Unicode Standard code charts.)
Hex	Official Listing	ISO 15919	Devanagari		Bengali		Assamese		Gurmukhi		Gujarati		Oriya		Tamil		Telugu		Kannada		Malayalam	
A0	Sign OM	Ōm̐	ॐ	0950							ૐ	0AD0										
A1	Vowel-modifier CHANDRABINDU	m̐	ँ	0901	ঁ	0981	ঁ	0981	ਁ	0A01	ઁ	0A81	ଁ	0B01			ఁ	0C01				
A2	Vowel-modifier ANUSWARAM	ṁ	ं	0902	ং	0982	ং	0982	ਂ	0A02	ં	0A82	ଂ	0B02	ஂ	0B82	ం	0C02	ಂ	0C82	ം	0D02
A3	Vowel-modifier VISARGAM	ḥ	ः	0903	ঃ	0983	ঃ	0983	ਃ	0A03	ઃ	0A83	ଃ	0B03	ஃ	0B83	ః	0C03	ಃ	0C83	ഃ	0D03
A4	Vowel A	a	अ	0905	অ	0985	অ	0985	ਅ	0A05	અ	0A85	ଅ	0B05	அ	0B85	అ	0C05	ಅ	0C85	അ	0D05
A5	Vowel AA	ā	आ	0906	আ	0986	আ	0986	ਆ	0A06	આ	0A86	ଆ	0B06	ஆ	0B86	ఆ	0C06	ಆ	0C86	ആ	0D06
A6	Vowel I	i	इ	0907	ই	0987	ই	0987	ਇ	0A07	ઇ	0A87	ଇ	0B07	இ	0B87	ఇ	0C07	ಇ	0C87	ഇ	0D07
A6*	Vowel LI (Sanskrit)	ḷ	ऌ	090C	ঌ	098C	ঌ	098C			ઌ	0A8C	ଌ	0B0C			ఌ	0C0C	ಌ	0C8C	ഌ	0D0C
A7	Vowel II	ī	ई	0908	ঈ	0988	ঈ	0988	ਈ	0A08	ઈ	0A88	ଈ	0B08	ஈ	0B88	ఈ	0C08	ಈ	0C88	ഈ	0D08
A7*	Vowel LII (Sanskrit)	ḹ	ॡ	0961	ৡ	09E1	ৡ	09E1			ૡ	0AE1	ୡ	0B61			ౡ	0C61	ೡ	0CE1	ൡ	0D61
A8	Vowel U	u	उ	0909	উ	0989	উ	0989	ਉ	0A09	ઉ	0A89	ଉ	0B09	உ	0B89	ఉ	0C09	ಉ	0C89	ഉ	0D09
A9	Vowel UU	ū	ऊ	090A	ঊ	098A	ঊ	098A	ਊ	0A0A	ઊ	0A8A	ଊ	0B0A	ஊ	0B8A	ఊ	0C0A	ಊ	0C8A	ഊ	0D0A
AA	Vowel RI	r̥	ऋ	090B	ঋ	098B	ঋ	098B			ઋ	0A8B	ଋ	0B0B			ఋ	0C0B	ಋ	0C8B	ഋ	0D0B
AA*	Vowel RII (Sanskrit)	ṝ	ॠ	0960	ৠ	09E0	ৠ	09E0			ૠ	0AE0	ୠ	0B60			ౠ	0C60	ೠ	0CE0	ൠ	0D60
AB	Vowel E (Southern Scripts)	e	ऎ	090E											எ	0B8E	ఎ	0C0E	ಎ	0C8E	എ	0D0E
AC	Vowel EY	ē	ए	090F	এ	098F	এ	098F	ਏ	0A0F	એ	0A8F	ଏ	0B0F	ஏ	0B8F	ఏ	0C0F	ಏ	0C8F	ഏ	0D0F
AD	Vowel AI	ai	ऐ	0910	ঐ	0990	ঐ	0990	ਐ	0A10	ઐ	0A90	ଐ	0B10	ஐ	0B90	ఐ	0C10	ಐ	0C90	ഐ	0D10
AE	Vowel AYE (Devanagari Script)	ê	ऍ	090D							ઍ	0A8D										
AF	Vowel O (Southern Scripts)	o	ऒ	0912											ஒ	0B92	ఒ	0C12	ಒ	0C92	ഒ	0D12
B0	Vowel OW	ō	ओ	0913	ও	0993	ও	0993	ਓ	0A13	ઓ	0A93	ଓ	0B13	ஓ	0B93	ఓ	0C13	ಓ	0C93	ഓ	0D13
B1	Vowel AU	au	औ	0914	ঔ	0994	ঔ	0994	ਔ	0A14	ઔ	0A94	ଔ	0B14	ஔ	0B94	ఔ	0C14	ಔ	0C94	ഔ	0D14
B2	Vowel AWE (Devanagari Script)	ô	ऑ	0911							ઑ	0A91										
B3	Consonant KA	k	क	0915	ক	0995	ক	0995	ਕ	0A15	ક	0A95	କ	0B15	க	0B95	క	0C15	ಕ	0C95	ക	0D15
B3*	Consonant QA (Urdu)	q	क़	0958																		
B4	Consonant KHA	kh	ख	0916	খ	0996	খ	0996	ਖ	0A16	ખ	0A96	ଖ	0B16			ఖ	0C16	ಖ	0C96	ഖ	0D16
B4*	Consonant KHHA (Urdu)	kh	ख़	0959					ਖ਼	0A59												
B5	Consonant GA	g	ग	0917	গ	0997	গ	0997	ਗ	0A17	ગ	0A97	ଗ	0B17			గ	0C17	ಗ	0C97	ഗ	0D17
B5*	Consonant GHHA (Urdu)	ġ	ग़	095A					ਗ਼	0A5A												
B6	Consonant GHA	gh	घ	0918	ঘ	0998	ঘ	0998	ਘ	0A18	ઘ	0A98	ଘ	0B18			ఘ	0C18	ಘ	0C98	ഘ	0D18
B7	Consonant NGA	ṅ	ङ	0919	ঙ	0999	ঙ	0999	ਙ	0A19	ઙ	0A99	ଙ	0B19	ங	0B99	ఙ	0C19	ಙ	0C99	ങ	0D19
B8	Consonant CHA	c	च	091A	চ	099A	চ	099A	ਚ	0A1A	ચ	0A9A	ଚ	0B1A	ச	0B9A	చ	0C1A	ಚ	0C9A	ച	0D1A
B9	Consonant CHHA	ch	छ	091B	ছ	099B	ছ	099B	ਛ	0A1B	છ	0A9B	ଛ	0B1B			ఛ	0C1B	ಛ	0C9B	ഛ	0D1B
BA	Consonant JA	j	ज	091C	জ	099C	জ	099C	ਜ	0A1C	જ	0A9C	ଜ	0B1C	ஜ	0B9C	జ	0C1C	ಜ	0C9C	ജ	0D1C
BA*	Consonant ZA (Urdu)	z	ज़	095B					ਜ਼	0A5B												
BB	Consonant JHA	jh	झ	091D	ঝ	099D	ঝ	099D	ਝ	0A1D	ઝ	0A9D	ଝ	0B1D			ఝ	0C1D	ಝ	0C9D	ഝ	0D1D
BC	Consonant JNA	ñ	ञ	091E	ঞ	099E	ঞ	099E	ਞ	0A1E	ઞ	0A9E	ଞ	0B1E	ஞ	0B9E	ఞ	0C1E	ಞ	0C9E	ഞ	0D1E
BD	Consonant Hard TA	ṭ	ट	091F	ট	099F	ট	099F	ਟ	0A1F	ટ	0A9F	ଟ	0B1F	ட	0B9F	ట	0C1F	ಟ	0C9F	ട	0D1F
BE	Consonant Hard THA	ṭh	ठ	0920	ঠ	09A0	ঠ	09A0	ਠ	0A20	ઠ	0AA0	ଠ	0B20			ఠ	0C20	ಠ	0CA0	ഠ	0D20
BF	Consonant Hard DA	ḍ	ड	0921	ড	09A1	ড	09A1	ਡ	0A21	ડ	0AA1	ଡ	0B21			డ	0C21	ಡ	0CA1	ഡ	0D21
BF*	Consonant Flapped DA	ṛ	ड़	095C	ড়	09DC	ড়	09DC	ੜ	0A5C			ଡ଼	0B5C								
C0	Consonant Hard DHA	ḍh	ढ	0922	ঢ	09A2	ঢ	09A2	ਢ	0A22	ઢ	0AA2	ଢ	0B22			ఢ	0C22	ಢ	0CA2	ഢ	0D22
C0*	Consonant Flapped DHA	ṛh	ढ़	095D	ঢ়	09DD	ঢ়	09DD					ଢ଼	0B5D								
C1	Consonant Hard NA	ṇ	ण	0923	ণ	09A3	ণ	09A3	ਣ	0A23	ણ	0AA3	ଣ	0B23	ண	0BA3	ణ	0C23	ಣ	0CA3	ണ	0D23
C2	Consonant Soft TA	t	त	0924	ত	09A4	ত	09A4	ਤ	0A24	ત	0AA4	ତ	0B24	த	0BA4	త	0C24	ತ	0CA4	ത	0D24
C3	Consonant Soft THA	th	थ	0925	থ	09A5	থ	09A5	ਥ	0A25	થ	0AA5	ଥ	0B25			థ	0C25	ಥ	0CA5	ഥ	0D25
C4	Consonant Soft DA	d	द	0926	দ	09A6	দ	09A6	ਦ	0A26	દ	0AA6	ଦ	0B26			ద	0C26	ದ	0CA6	ദ	0D26
C5	Consonant Soft DHA	dh	ध	0927	ধ	09A7	ধ	09A7	ਧ	0A27	ધ	0AA7	ଧ	0B27			ధ	0C27	ಧ	0CA7	ധ	0D27
C6	Consonant Soft NA	n	न	0928	ন	09A8	ন	09A8	ਨ	0A28	ન	0AA8	ନ	0B28	ந	0BA8	న	0C28	ನ	0CA8	ന	0D28
C7	Consonant NA (Tamil)	ṉ	ऩ	0929											ன	0BA9						
C8	Consonant PA	p	प	092A	প	09AA	প	09AA	ਪ	0A2A	પ	0AAA	ପ	0B2A	ப	0BAA	ప	0C2A	ಪ	0CAA	പ	0D2A
C9	Consonant PHA	ph	फ	092B	ফ	09AB	ফ	09AB	ਫ	0A2B	ફ	0AAB	ଫ	0B2B			ఫ	0C2B	ಫ	0CAB	ഫ	0D2B
C9*	Consonant FA (Urdu)	f	फ़	095E					ਫ਼	0A5E									ೞ	0CDE		
CA	Consonant BA	b	ब	092C	ব	09AC	ব	09AC	ਬ	0A2C	બ	0AAC	ବ	0B2C			బ	0C2C	ಬ	0CAC	ബ	0D2C
CB	Consonant BHA	bh	भ	092D	ভ	09AD	ভ	09AD	ਭ	0A2D	ભ	0AAD	ଭ	0B2D			భ	0C2D	ಭ	0CAD	ഭ	0D2D
CC	Consonant MA	m	म	092E	ম	09AE	ম	09AE	ਮ	0A2E	મ	0AAE	ମ	0B2E	ம	0BAE	మ	0C2E	ಮ	0CAE	മ	0D2E
CD	Consonant YA	y	य	092F	য	09AF	য	09AF	ਯ	0A2F	ય	0AAF	ଯ	0B2F	ய	0BAF	య	0C2F	ಯ	0CAF	യ	0D2F
CE	Consonant JYA (Bengali, Assamese & Oriya)	ẏ	य़	095F	য়	09DF	য়	09DF					ୟ	0B5F								
CF	Consonant RA	r̥	र	0930	র	09B0	ৰ︎	09F0	ਰ	0A30	ર	0AB0	ର	0B30	ர	0BB0	ర	0C30	ರ	0CB0	ര	0D30
D0	Consonant Hard RA (Southern Scripts)	ṟ	ऱ	0931											ற	0BB1	ఱ	0C31	ಱ	0CB1	റ	0D31
D1	Consonant LA	l	ल	0932	ল	09B2	ল	09B2	ਲ	0A32	લ	0AB2	ଲ	0B32	ல	0BB2	ల	0C32	ಲ	0CB2	ല	0D32
D2	Consonant Hard LA	ḷ	ळ	0933					ਲ਼	0A33	ળ	0AB3	ଳ	0B33	ள	0BB3	ళ	0C33	ಳ	0CB3	ള	0D33
D3	Consonant ZHA (Tamil & Malayalam)	ḻ	ऴ	0934											ழ	0BB4					ഴ	0D34
D4	Consonant VA	v	व	0935	ব	09AC	ৱ	09F1	ਵ	0A35	વ	0AB5	ଵ	0B35	வ	0BB5	వ	0C35	ವ	0CB5	വ	0D35
D5	Consonant SHA	ś	श	0936	শ	09B6	শ	09B6	ਸ਼	0A36	શ	0AB6	ଶ	0B36	ஶ	0BB6	శ	0C36	ಶ	0CB6	ശ	0D36
D6	Consonant Hard SHA	ṣ	ष	0937	ষ	09B7	ষ	09B7			ષ	0AB7	ଷ	0B37	ஷ	0BB7	ష	0C37	ಷ	0CB7	ഷ	0D37
D7	Consonant SA	s	स	0938	স	09B8	স	09B8	ਸ	0A38	સ	0AB8	ସ	0B38	ஸ	0BB8	స	0C38	ಸ	0CB8	സ	0D38
D8	Consonant HA	h	ह	0939	হ	09B9	হ	09B9	ਹ	0A39	હ	0AB9	ହ	0B39	ஹ	0BB9	హ	0C39	ಹ	0CB9	ഹ	0D39
D9	Consonant INVISIBLE																					
DA	Vowel Sign AA	ā	ा	093E	া	09BE	া	09BE	ਾ	0A3E	ા	0ABE	ା	0B3E	ா	0BBE	ా	0C3E	ಾ	0CBE	ാ	0D3E
DB	Vowel Sign I	i	ि	093F	ি	09BF	ি	09BF	ਿ	0A3F	િ	0ABF	ି	0B3F	ி	0BBF	ి	0C3F	ಿ	0CBF	ി	0D3F
DB*	Vowel Sign LI (Sanskrit)	ḷ	ॢ	0962	ৢ	09E2	ৢ	09E2			ૢ	0AE2	ୢ	0B62			ౢ	0C62	ೢ	0CE2	ൢ	0D62
DC	Vowel Sign II	ī	ी	0940	ী	09C0	ী	09C0	ੀ	0A40	ી	0AC0	ୀ	0B40	ீ	0BC0	ీ	0C40	ೀ	0CC0	ീ	0D40
DC*	Vowel Sign LII (Sanskrit)	ḹ	ॣ	0963	ৣ	09E3	ৣ	09E3			ૣ	0AE3	ୣ	0B63			ౣ	0C63	ೣ	0CE3	ൣ	0D63
DD	Vowel Sign U	u	ु	0941	ু	09C1	ু	09C1	ੁ	0A41	ુ	0AC1	ୁ	0B41	ு	0BC1	ు	0C41	ು	0CC1	ു	0D41
DE	Vowel Sign UU	ū	ू	0942	ূ	09C2	ূ	09C2	ੂ	0A42	ૂ	0AC2	ୂ	0B42	ூ	0BC2	ూ	0C42	ೂ	0CC2	ൂ	0D42
DF	Vowel Sign RI	r̥	ृ	0943	ৃ	09C3	ৃ	09C3			ૃ	0AC3	ୃ	0B43			ృ	0C43	ೃ	0CC3	ൃ	0D43
DF*	Vowel Sign RII (Sanskrit)	ṝ	ॄ	0944	ৄ	09C4	ৄ	09C4			ૄ	0AC4	ୄ	0B44			ౄ	0C44	ೄ	0CC4	ൄ	0D44
E0	Vowel Sign E (Southern Scripts)	e	ॆ	0946											ெ	0BC6	ె	0C46	ೆ	0CC6	െ	0D46
E1	Vowel Sign EY	ē	े	0947	ে	09C7	ে	09C7	ੇ	0A47	ે	0AC7	େ	0B47	ே	0BC7	ే	0C47	ೇ	0CC7	േ	0D47
E2	Vowel Sign AI	ai	ै	0948	ৈ	09C8	ৈ	09C8	ੈ	0A48	ૈ	0AC8	ୈ	0B48	ை	0BC8	ై	0C48	ೈ	0CC8	ൈ	0D48
E3	Vowel Sign AYE (Devanagari Script)	ê	ॅ	0945							ૅ	0AC5										
E4	Vowel Sign O (Southern Scripts)	o	ॊ	094A											ொ	0BCA	ొ	0C4A	ೊ	0CCA	ൊ	0D4A
E5	Vowel Sign OW	ō	ो	094B	ো	09CB	ো	09CB	ੋ	0A4B	ો	0ACB	ୋ	0B4B	ோ	0BCB	ో	0C4B	ೋ	0CCB	ോ	0D4B
E6	Vowel Sign AU	au	ौ	094C	ৌ	09CC	ৌ	09CC	ੌ	0A4C	ૌ	0ACC	ୌ	0B4C	ௌ	0BCC	ౌ	0C4C	ೌ	0CCC	ൌ	0D4C
E7	Vowel Sign AWE (Devanagari Script)	ô	ॉ	0949							ૉ	0AC9										
E8	Vowel Omission Sign (Halant)		्	094D	্	09CD	্	09CD	੍	0A4D	્	0ACD	୍	0B4D	்	0BCD	్	0C4D	್	0CCD	്	0D4D
E9	Diacritic Sign (Nuktam)		़	093C	়	09BC	়	09BC	਼	0A3C	઼	0ABC	଼	0B3C					಼	0CBC		
EA	Full Stop (Viram, Northern Scripts)		।	0964																		
EA*	Vowel Stress Sign AVAGRAH		ऽ	093D	ঽ	09BD	ঽ	09BD			ઽ	0ABD	ଽ	0B3D			ఽ	0C3D	ಽ	0CBD	ഽ	0D3D
EB	Unused																					
EC	Unused																					
ED	Unused																					
EE	Unused																					
EF	Attribute Code																					
F0	Extension Code																					
F1	Digit 0		०	0966	০	09E6	০	09E6	੦	0A66	૦	0AE6	୦	0B66	௦	0BE6	౦	0C66	೦	0CE6	൦	0D66
F2	Digit 1		१	0967	১	09E7	১	09E7	੧	0A67	૧	0AE7	୧	0B67	௧	0BE7	౧	0C67	೧	0CE7	൧	0D67
F3	Digit 2		२	0968	২	09E8	২	09E8	੨	0A68	૨	0AE8	୨	0B68	௨	0BE8	౨	0C68	೨	0CE8	൨	0D68
F4	Digit 3		३	0969	৩	09E9	৩	09E9	੩	0A69	૩	0AE9	୩	0B69	௩	0BE9	౩	0C69	೩	0CE9	൩	0D69
F5	Digit 4		४	096A	৪	09EA	৪	09EA	੪	0A6A	૪	0AEA	୪	0B6A	௪	0BEA	౪	0C6A	೪	0CEA	൪	0D6A
F6	Digit 5		५	096B	৫	09EB	৫	09EB	੫	0A6B	૫	0AEB	୫	0B6B	௫	0BEB	౫	0C6B	೫	0CEB	൫	0D6B
F7	Digit 6		६	096C	৬	09EC	৬	09EC	੬	0A6C	૬	0AEC	୬	0B6C	௬	0BEC	౬	0C6C	೬	0CEC	൬	0D6C
F8	Digit 7		७	096D	৭	09ED	৭	09ED	੭	0A6D	૭	0AED	୭	0B6D	௭	0BED	౭	0C6D	೭	0CED	൭	0D6D
F9	Digit 8		८	096E	৮	09EE	৮	09EE	੮	0A6E	૮	0AEE	୮	0B6E	௮	0BEE	౮	0C6E	೮	0CEE	൮	0D6E
FA	Digit 9		९	096F	৯	09EF	৯	09EF	੯	0A6F	૯	0AEF	୯	0B6F	௯	0BEF	౯	0C6F	೯	0CEF	൯	0D6F
FB	Unused																					
FC	Unused																					
FD	Unused																					
FE	Unused																					
FF	Unused																					
