= Modi script =

Historical script used in the Maratha Empire to write the Marathi language

Mōḍī मोडी 𑘦𑘻𑘚𑘲
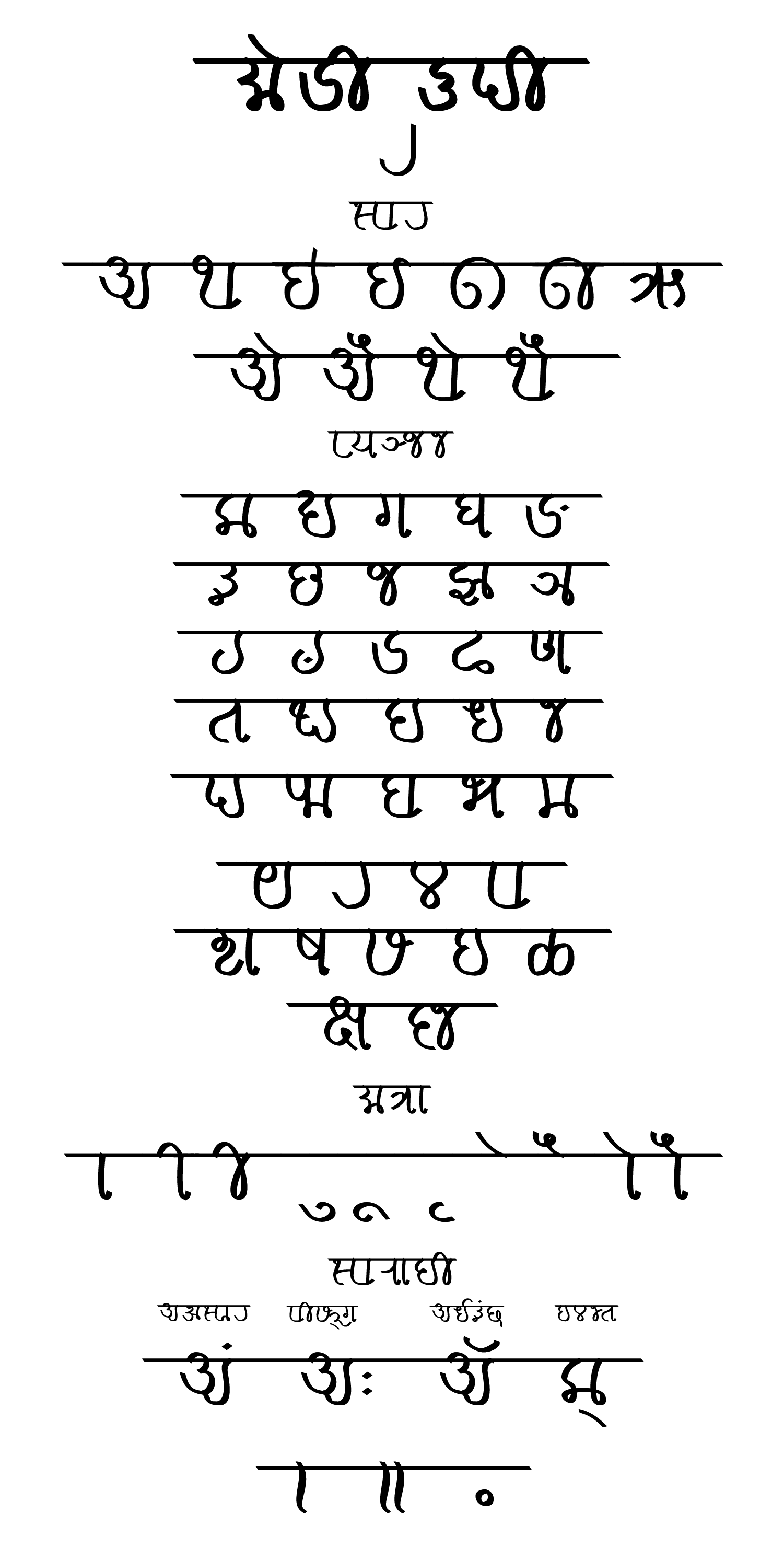
- Mōḍī Varnamala (Alphabet Chart) divided into 11 Vowels (𑘭𑘿𑘪𑘨) (Note: The letters 𑘂 (i) and 𑘅 (ū) and their diacritics have been attested and therefore are included in this chart, However, Mōḍī generally uses 𑘃 for both i and ī, and 𑘄 for both u and ū.) , (Note: Sanskrit origin vocalics 𑘆 𑘇𑘈 𑘉 have Mōḍī equivalents even though their usage is extremely limited. Only 𑘆 has been included due to Indic script traditions.) 36 Basic consonants (𑘪𑘿𑘧𑘗𑘿𑘕𑘡), 10 Vowel diacritics (𑘦𑘰𑘝𑘿𑘨𑘰), 4 Special diacritic marks (𑘭𑘿𑘪𑘨𑘰𑘟𑘲), 3 punctuation signs and an invocation sign used in Mōḍī documents at the very top. (Note: Mōḍī is a cursive handwritten script with a unique practice of having one long headstroke (śirorekhā) connecting all the words in a line. This is distinct from Devanagari and other Nagari scripts, where the Headstroke is only limited to full letters or words.)
- Script type: Abugida
- Period: c. 1200 or c. 1600–c. R1950 (Two different origin theories)
- Direction: Left-to-right
- Languages: Primary; Marathi; Sometimes; Konkani, Hindi, Gujarati, Kannada, Telugu and Sanskrit

Related scripts
- Parent systems: Proto-Sinaitic script: Phoenician alphabet; Aramaic alphabet; Brahmi; Gupta; Siddhaṃ; Nāgarī; Mōḍī
- Sister systems: Gujarati, Kaithi, Devanagari, Nandinagari, Gunjala Gondi

ISO 15924
- ISO 15924: Modi (324), Modi, Moḍī

Unicode
- Unicode alias: Modi
- Unicode range: U+11600–U+1165F; Final Accepted Script Proposal

Mōḍī (Marathi: मोडी, 𑘦𑘻𑘚𑘲, Mōḍī, Marathi pronunciation: [moːɖiː]) is an old handwritten cursive abugida script used to write the Marathi language, which is the primary language spoken in the state of Maharashtra, India. The Mōḍī script was used alongside the Devanāgarī script to write Marathi, particularly during the reign of the Maratha Empire, until the 20th century when the Balbodh style of the Devanāgarī script was promoted as the standard writing system for Marathi. Numerous archival records, official documents and correspondences written in this script exist, and there have been attempts to revive the usage of Mōḍī in Maharashtra.

There are multiple theories concerning its origin. It descends from the Nāgarī family of scripts and is based on the Nāgarī model, adapted for fluid continuous writing. Due to its handwritten nature, it has various styles and extensive character ligatures considerably different from Devanāgarī. Mōḍī has a practice of having one long headstroke (called śirorekhā) connecting all the words in a line without breaks. This is distinct from Devanāgarī and other Nāgarī scripts, where the śirorekhā is only limited to isolated letters or words.

Mōḍī is a unicameral Brahmic alpha-syllabary written from left to right. It has 46 base characters divided into 11 vowels, 36 basic consonants, 10 unique numerals and various diacritical and punctuation marks.

== Etymology ==
The name Mōḍī may be derived from the Marathi verb moḍaṇe (Marathi: मोडणे), which means "to bend or break".

== Origin theories ==
=== Hemāḍapanta origin theory ===
Hemāḍpant was a minister during the reign of Mahadeva (ruled 1261–1271) and the initial years of the reign of Rāmachandra (ruled 1271 to 1309) of the Yadava Dynasty.

==== Creation subtheory ====
Hemāḍapanta created the Mōḍī script.

==== Refinement subtheory ====
The Mōḍī script already existed in the 13th century; it was refined and introduced as an official script for Marathi by Hemāḍpant.

==== Sri Lanka subtheory ====
Hemāḍpant brought the Mōḍī script to India from Sri Lanka.

=== Bāḷājī Avajī Chitnis origin theory ===
Bāḷājī Avajī Chitnis was the secretary of state to the Maratha king Shivaji Maharaj (ruled 1642–1680).

== History ==
Facsimile of the handwriting of Chandrasen Jadhao, 9 October 1730.

A handwritten letter by Chimaji Appa, 1739

Historically, Mōḍī developed as an administrative cursive longhand form of older forms of Nāgarī in the Maratha heartlands around the 16th c.e. After the rise of the Maratha dynasties, it was officially adopted and used by them from the 17^{th} c.e until the 20^{th} c.e. William Carey in 1807 observed that as with other parts of India, a traditional duality existed in script usage between Devanāgarī for religious texts, and Mōḍī for commerce and administration.

Although in the Mahratta country the Devanagari character is well known to men of education, yet a character is current among the men of business which is much smaller, and varies considerably in form from the Nagari, though the number and power of the letters nearly correspond.

There are various styles of the Mōḍī script associated with a particular era. Many changes occurred in each era

=== Proto-Mōḍī ===
The proto-Mōḍī, or ādyakālīna (Marathi: आद्यकालीन) style appeared in the 12th century.

=== Yādava Era ===
The Yādava Era style, or yādavakālīna (Marathi: यादवकालीन), emerged as a distinct style in the 13th century during the Yādava Dynasty.

=== Bahamanī Era ===
The Bahamanī Era style, or bahamanīkālīna (Marathi: बहमनीकालीन), appeared in the 14th–16th centuries during the years of the Bahmani Sultanate.

=== Chatrapati Shivaji Era ===
During the rule of Shivaji, the Shivaji style, or shivakālīna (Marathi: शिवकालीन), which was during the 17th century, the Chitnisi style of the Mōḍī script developed.

=== Peshwa Era ===
In the Peshwa Era, or peshvekālīna (Marathi: पेश्वेकालीन), various Mōḍī styles proliferated during the Maratha Empire and lasted until 1818. The prominent styles of Mōḍī used during this period were Chitnisi, Bilavalkari, Mahadevapanti, and Ranadi. Although all were popular, Chitnisi was the most prominent and most frequently used script for Mōḍī writing.

=== Colonial Era ===
Facsimile of a letter written in Mōḍī script by Mr Walchand Hirachand dated 6th January, 1907. The style of Mōḍī is Anglakalin.

During the colonial period, the final stage of Mōḍī called Anglakalin (Marathi: आंगल कालीन) emerged. This style was used from 1818 until 1952. The first metal fonts for printing in Mōḍī were developed by Charles Wilkins in the early 19^{th} c.e. During this era, the script was used in newspapers, journals, private diaries and other everyday correspondence. Word spacing and Western punctuation marks were introduced. William Carey's Dictionary of the Maratta language (1810) and its subsequent later editions used the Mōḍī script for transcribing Marathi.

=== Decline ===
On 25 July 1917, the Bombay Presidency decided to replace the Modi script with Balbodh as the primary script of administration, for convenience and uniformity with the other areas of the presidency. The script was still widely used, until the 1940s, by the people of older generations for personal and financial uses. The use of Mōḍī diminished after India's independence in 1947. The primary reason was the discontinuation of printing in the script due to the practical difficulty of producing metal typefaces encompassing all of the extensive ligatures and conjuncts in Mōḍī. Now the Balbodh style of Devanagari is the primary script used to write Marathi.

=== Revival efforts ===
Linguists in Pune spearheaded the Mōḍī script revival movement in 2014. By 2025, over 400 students had been trained to understand it. Additionally, a primary school has begun teaching the Mōḍī script to the next generation.

== Characteristics ==
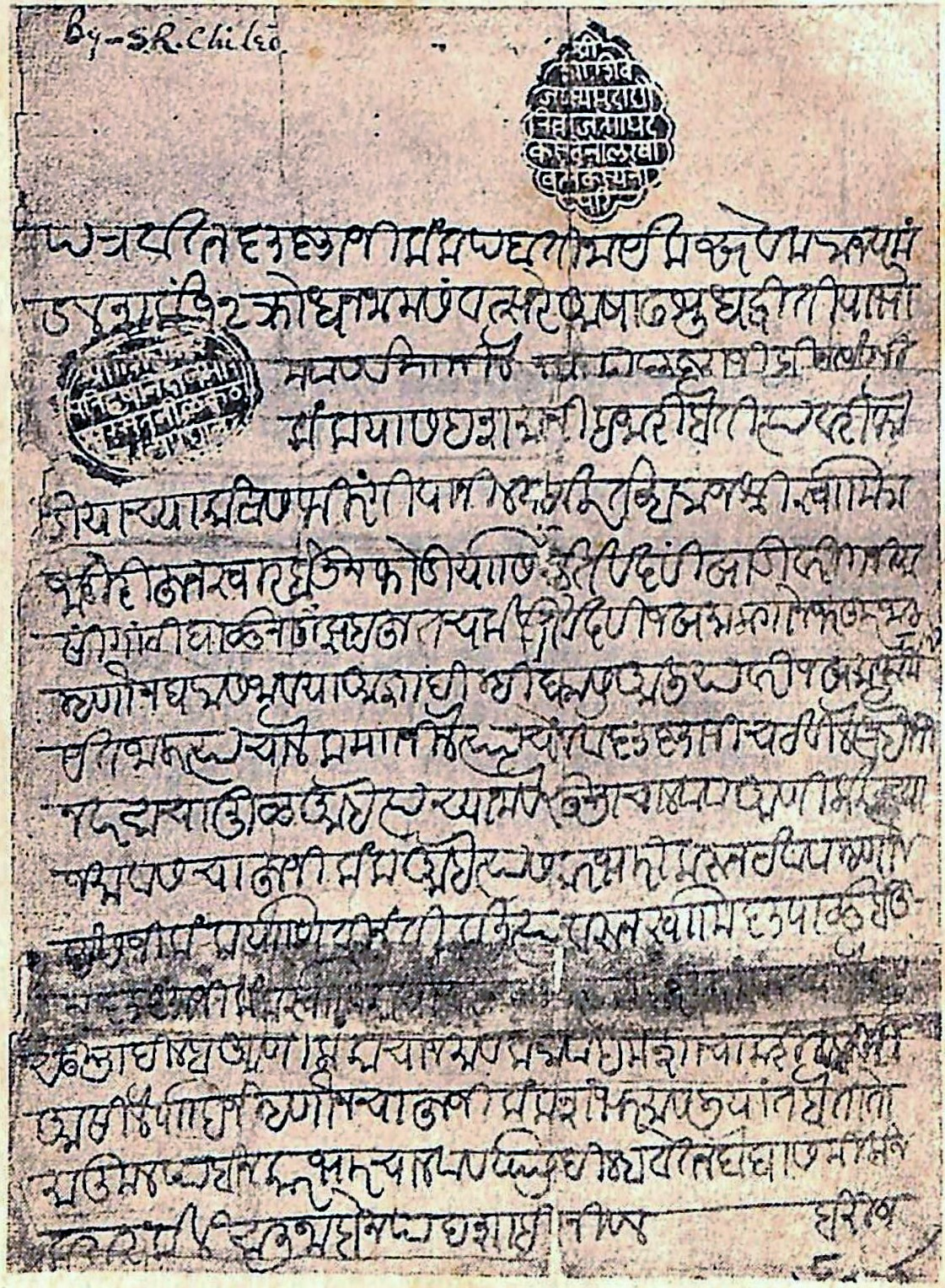
Folio of Chh. Sambhaji's Watanpatra (A grant in perpetuity)

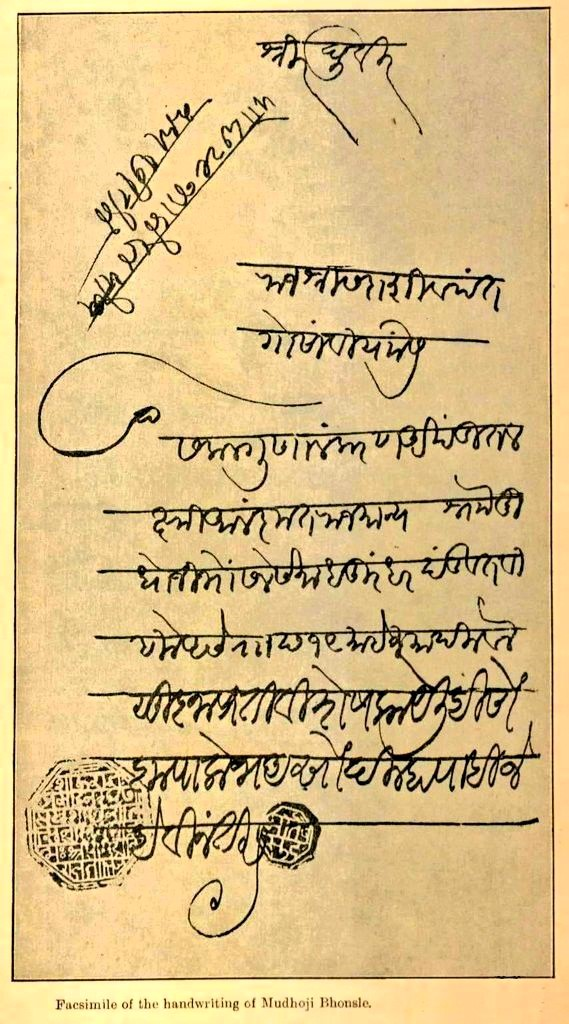
Seal, Signature and handwriting of Maratha Senadhurandar Mudhoji Bhonsle I of Chandrapur and Nagpur

The Mōḍī script derives from the Nāgari family of scripts and is a modification of the Balbodh style of the Devanagari script intended for continuous writing. Although Mōḍī is based upon Devanagari, it differs considerably from it in terms of letter forms, rendering behaviours, and orthography. The shapes of some consonants, vowels, and vowel signs are similar. The differences are visible in the behaviours of these characters in certain circumstances, such as consonant-vowel combinations and consonant conjuncts, which are standard features of Mōḍī orthography. The Mōḍī script has 46 distinctive letters, of which 36 are consonants and 10 vowels.

Vowels
Vowel	a	ā	i	ī	u	ū	r̥	r̥̄	l̥	l̥̄
Independent	𑘀	𑘁	𑘂	𑘃	𑘄	𑘅	𑘆	𑘇	𑘈	𑘉
Dependent		𑘰	𑘱	𑘲	𑘳	𑘴	𑘵	𑘶	𑘷	𑘸

Vowel	e	ai	o	au
Independent	𑘊	𑘋	𑘌	𑘍
Dependent	𑘹	𑘺	𑘻	𑘼

Consonants
𑘎 ka	𑘏 kha	𑘐 ga	𑘑 gha	𑘒 ṅa
𑘓 ca	𑘔 cha	𑘕 ja	𑘖 jha	𑘗 ña
𑘘 ṭa	𑘙 ṭha	𑘚 ḍa	𑘛 ḍha	𑘜 ṇa
𑘝 ta	𑘞 tha	𑘟 da	𑘠 dha	𑘡 na
𑘢 pa	𑘣 pha	𑘤 ba	𑘥 bha	𑘦 ma
𑘧 ya	𑘨 ra	𑘩 la	𑘪 va	
𑘫 śa	𑘬 ṣa	𑘭 sa	𑘮 ha	𑘯 ḷa

Signs
𑘽 ṁ	𑘾 ḥ	𑘿 virama	𑙀 ardhacandra

=== Head stroke ===
Bajirao I's handwriting in Mōḍī script

The head stroke in Mōḍī is unlike Devanagari in that it is typically written before the letters are, in order to produce a "ruled page" for writing Mōḍī in lines. Thus, there are no word boundaries that can be visibly seen, since the head stroke does not break between words.

=== Cursive features ===
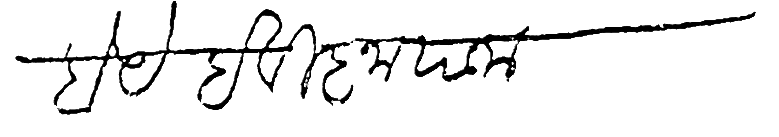
Handwriting of Balaji Baji Rao (Nanasaheb I)

The Mōḍī script has several characteristics that facilitate writing, minimising having to lift the pen from the paper for dipping in ink while moving from one character to the next. Some characters are "broken" versions of their Devanagari counterparts, and many characters are more circular in shape. These characteristics make Mōḍī a sort of cursive style of writing Marathi. The cursive nature of the script also allowed scribes to easily make multiple copies of a document if required.

== Conjuncts and ligation ==
Numerous modifications are made to the Mōḍī script in writing as "shortcuts", reflecting its history as a quasi-shorthand form of Devanagari.

=== Consonant-vowel conjuncts ===
Consonant ligation falls into three broad categories:

- Those that always retain their isolated form and attach their dependent vowel forms in a way common to most Indic scripts
- Those that take on a "contextual" form and change their form only in the presence of a dependent vowel immediately after, in which case those vowel forms are attached to the contextual form of the consonant in a uniform way as done with the consonants in Category 1 and with most other Indic alphabets
- Those that form ligatures in the presence of a vowel following the consonants. The ligatures are generally determined by the shape of the consonant and the presence of a loop on the right.

Mōḍī bārākhaḍī (𑘤𑘰𑘨𑘰𑘏𑘚𑘲)
Consonants ↓	𑘀	𑘁	𑘂 (Note: The letter 𑘂 (i) and its diacritics have been attested and therefore are included. However, Mōḍī generally uses 𑘃 for both i and ī.)	𑘃	𑘄	𑘅 (Note: The letter 𑘅 (ū) and its diacritics have been attested and therefore are included. However, Mōḍī generally 𑘄 for both u and ū.)	𑘆	𑘇	𑘈	𑘉	𑘊	𑘋	𑘌	𑘍	𑘀𑘽	𑘀𑘾
𑘎𑘿	𑘎	𑘎𑘰	𑘎𑘱	𑘎𑘲	𑘎𑘳	𑘎𑘴	𑘎𑘵	𑘎𑘶	𑘎𑘷	𑘎𑘸	𑘎𑘹	𑘎𑘺	𑘎𑘻	𑘎𑘼	𑘎𑘽	𑘎𑘾
𑘏𑘿	𑘏	𑘏𑘰	𑘏𑘱	𑘏𑘲	𑘏𑘳	𑘏𑘴	𑘏𑘵	𑘏𑘶	𑘏𑘷	𑘏𑘸	𑘏𑘹	𑘏𑘺	𑘏𑘻	𑘏𑘼	𑘏𑘽	𑘏𑘾
𑘐𑘿	𑘐	𑘐𑘰	𑘐𑘱	𑘐𑘲	𑘐𑘳	𑘐𑘴	𑘐𑘵	𑘐𑘶	𑘐𑘷	𑘐𑘸	𑘐𑘹	𑘐𑘺	𑘐𑘻	𑘐𑘼	𑘐𑘽	𑘐𑘾
𑘑𑘿	𑘑	𑘑𑘰	𑘑𑘱	𑘑𑘲	𑘑𑘳	𑘑𑘴	𑘑𑘵	𑘑𑘶	𑘑𑘷	𑘑𑘸	𑘑𑘹	𑘑𑘺	𑘑𑘻	𑘑𑘼	𑘑𑘽	𑘑𑘾
𑘒𑘿	𑘒	𑘒𑘰	𑘒𑘱	𑘒𑘲	𑘒𑘳	𑘒𑘴	𑘒𑘵	𑘒𑘶	𑘒𑘷	𑘒𑘸	𑘒𑘹	𑘒𑘺	𑘒𑘻	𑘒𑘼	𑘒𑘽	𑘒𑘾
𑘓𑘿	𑘓	𑘓𑘰	𑘓𑘱	𑘓𑘲	𑘓𑘳	𑘓𑘴	𑘓𑘵	𑘓𑘶	𑘓𑘷	𑘓𑘸	𑘓𑘹	𑘓𑘺	𑘓𑘻	𑘓𑘼	𑘓𑘽	𑘓𑘾
𑘔𑘿	𑘔	𑘔𑘰	𑘔𑘱	𑘔𑘲	𑘔𑘳	𑘔𑘴	𑘔𑘵	𑘔𑘶	𑘔𑘷	𑘔𑘸	𑘔𑘹	𑘔𑘺	𑘔𑘻	𑘔𑘼	𑘔𑘽	𑘔𑘾
𑘕𑘿	𑘕	𑘕𑘰	𑘕𑘱	𑘕𑘲	𑘕𑘳	𑘕𑘴	𑘕𑘵	𑘕𑘶	𑘕𑘷	𑘕𑘸	𑘕𑘹	𑘕𑘺	𑘕𑘻	𑘕𑘼	𑘕𑘽	𑘕𑘾
𑘖𑘿	𑘖	𑘖𑘰	𑘖𑘱	𑘖𑘲	𑘖𑘳	𑘖𑘴	𑘖𑘵	𑘖𑘶	𑘖𑘷	𑘖𑘸	𑘖𑘹	𑘖𑘺	𑘖𑘻	𑘖𑘼	𑘖𑘽	𑘖𑘾
𑘗𑘿	𑘗	𑘗𑘰	𑘗𑘱	𑘗𑘲	𑘗𑘳	𑘗𑘴	𑘗𑘵	𑘗𑘶	𑘗𑘷	𑘗𑘸	𑘗𑘹	𑘗𑘺	𑘗𑘻	𑘗𑘼	𑘗𑘽	𑘗𑘾
𑘘𑘿	𑘘	𑘘𑘰	𑘘𑘱	𑘘𑘲	𑘘𑘳	𑘘𑘴	𑘘𑘵	𑘘𑘶	𑘘𑘷	𑘘𑘸	𑘘𑘹	𑘘𑘺	𑘘𑘻	𑘘𑘼	𑘘𑘽	𑘘𑘾
𑘙𑘿	𑘙	𑘙𑘰	𑘙𑘱	𑘙𑘲	𑘙𑘳	𑘙𑘴	𑘙𑘵	𑘙𑘶	𑘙𑘷	𑘙𑘸	𑘙𑘹	𑘙𑘺	𑘙𑘻	𑘙𑘼	𑘙𑘽	𑘙𑘾
𑘚𑘿	𑘚	𑘚𑘰	𑘚𑘱	𑘚𑘲	𑘚𑘳	𑘚𑘴	𑘚𑘵	𑘚𑘶	𑘚𑘷	𑘚𑘸	𑘚𑘹	𑘚𑘺	𑘚𑘻	𑘚𑘼	𑘚𑘽	𑘚𑘾
𑘛𑘿	𑘛	𑘛𑘰	𑘛𑘱	𑘛𑘲	𑘛𑘳	𑘛𑘴	𑘛𑘵	𑘛𑘶	𑘛𑘷	𑘛𑘸	𑘛𑘹	𑘛𑘺	𑘛𑘻	𑘛𑘼	𑘛𑘽	𑘛𑘾
𑘜𑘿	𑘜	𑘜𑘰	𑘜𑘱	𑘜𑘲	𑘜𑘳	𑘜𑘴	𑘜𑘵	𑘜𑘶	𑘜𑘷	𑘜𑘸	𑘜𑘹	𑘜𑘺	𑘜𑘻	𑘜𑘼	𑘜𑘽	𑘜𑘾
𑘝𑘿	𑘝	𑘝𑘰	𑘝𑘱	𑘝𑘲	𑘝𑘳	𑘝𑘴	𑘝𑘵	𑘝𑘶	𑘝𑘷	𑘝𑘸	𑘝𑘹	𑘝𑘺	𑘝𑘻	𑘝𑘼	𑘝𑘽	𑘝𑘾
𑘞𑘿	𑘞	𑘞𑘰	𑘞𑘱	𑘞𑘲	𑘞𑘳	𑘞𑘴	𑘞𑘵	𑘞𑘶	𑘞𑘷	𑘞𑘸	𑘞𑘹	𑘞𑘺	𑘞𑘻	𑘞𑘼	𑘞𑘽	𑘞𑘾
𑘟𑘿	𑘟	𑘟𑘰	𑘟𑘱	𑘟𑘲	𑘟𑘳	𑘟𑘴	𑘟𑘵	𑘟𑘶	𑘟𑘷	𑘟𑘸	𑘟𑘹	𑘟𑘺	𑘟𑘻	𑘟𑘼	𑘟𑘽	𑘟𑘾
𑘠𑘿	𑘠	𑘠𑘰	𑘠𑘱	𑘠𑘲	𑘠𑘳	𑘠𑘴	𑘠𑘵	𑘠𑘶	𑘠𑘷	𑘠𑘸	𑘠𑘹	𑘠𑘺	𑘠𑘻	𑘠𑘼	𑘠𑘽	𑘠𑘾
𑘡𑘿	𑘡	𑘡𑘰	𑘡𑘱	𑘡𑘲	𑘡𑘳	𑘡𑘴	𑘡𑘵	𑘡𑘶	𑘡𑘷	𑘡𑘸	𑘡𑘹	𑘡𑘺	𑘡𑘻	𑘡𑘼	𑘡𑘽	𑘡𑘾
𑘢𑘿	𑘢	𑘢𑘰	𑘢𑘱	𑘢𑘲	𑘢𑘳	𑘢𑘴	𑘢𑘵	𑘢𑘶	𑘢𑘷	𑘢𑘸	𑘢𑘹	𑘢𑘺	𑘢𑘻	𑘢𑘼	𑘢𑘽	𑘢𑘾
𑘣𑘿	𑘣	𑘣𑘰	𑘣𑘱	𑘣𑘲	𑘣𑘳	𑘣𑘴	𑘣𑘵	𑘣𑘶	𑘣𑘷	𑘣𑘸	𑘣𑘹	𑘣𑘺	𑘣𑘻	𑘣𑘼	𑘣𑘽	𑘣𑘾
𑘤𑘿	𑘤	𑘤𑘰	𑘤𑘱	𑘤𑘲	𑘤𑘳	𑘤𑘴	𑘤𑘵	𑘤𑘶	𑘤𑘷	𑘤𑘸	𑘤𑘹	𑘤𑘺	𑘤𑘻	𑘤𑘼	𑘤𑘽	𑘤𑘾
𑘥𑘿	𑘥	𑘥𑘰	𑘥𑘱	𑘥𑘲	𑘥𑘳	𑘥𑘴	𑘥𑘵	𑘥𑘶	𑘥𑘷	𑘥𑘸	𑘥𑘹	𑘥𑘺	𑘥𑘻	𑘥𑘼	𑘥𑘽	𑘥𑘾
𑘦𑘿	𑘦	𑘦𑘰	𑘦𑘱	𑘦𑘲	𑘦𑘳	𑘦𑘴	𑘦𑘵	𑘦𑘶	𑘦𑘷	𑘦𑘸	𑘦𑘹	𑘦𑘺	𑘦𑘻	𑘦𑘼	𑘦𑘽	𑘦𑘾
𑘧𑘿	𑘧	𑘧𑘰	𑘧𑘱	𑘧𑘲	𑘧𑘳	𑘧𑘴	𑘧𑘵	𑘧𑘶	𑘧𑘷	𑘧𑘸	𑘧𑘹	𑘧𑘺	𑘧𑘻	𑘧𑘼	𑘧𑘽	𑘧𑘾
𑘨𑘿	𑘨	𑘨𑘰	𑘨𑘱	𑘨𑘲	𑘨𑘳	𑘨𑘴	𑘨𑘵	𑘨𑘶	𑘨𑘷	𑘨𑘸	𑘨𑘹	𑘨𑘺	𑘨𑘻	𑘨𑘼	𑘨𑘽	𑘨𑘾
𑘩𑘿	𑘩	𑘩𑘰	𑘩𑘱	𑘩𑘲	𑘩𑘳	𑘩𑘴	𑘩𑘵	𑘩𑘶	𑘩𑘷	𑘩𑘸	𑘩𑘹	𑘩𑘺	𑘩𑘻	𑘩𑘼	𑘩𑘽	𑘩𑘾
𑘪𑘿	𑘪	𑘪𑘰	𑘪𑘱	𑘪𑘲	𑘪𑘳	𑘪𑘴	𑘪𑘵	𑘪𑘶	𑘪𑘷	𑘪𑘸	𑘪𑘹	𑘪𑘺	𑘪𑘻	𑘪𑘼	𑘪𑘽	𑘪𑘾
𑘫𑘿	𑘫	𑘫𑘰	𑘫𑘱	𑘫𑘲	𑘫𑘳	𑘫𑘴	𑘫𑘵	𑘫𑘶	𑘫𑘷	𑘫𑘸	𑘫𑘹	𑘫𑘺	𑘫𑘻	𑘫𑘼	𑘫𑘽	𑘫𑘾
𑘬𑘿	𑘬	𑘬𑘰	𑘬𑘱	𑘬𑘲	𑘬𑘳	𑘬𑘴	𑘬𑘵	𑘬𑘶	𑘬𑘷	𑘬𑘸	𑘬𑘹	𑘬𑘺	𑘬𑘻	𑘬𑘼	𑘬𑘽	𑘬𑘾
𑘭𑘿	𑘭	𑘭𑘰	𑘭𑘱	𑘭𑘲	𑘭𑘳	𑘭𑘴	𑘭𑘵	𑘭𑘶	𑘭𑘷	𑘭𑘸	𑘭𑘹	𑘭𑘺	𑘭𑘻	𑘭𑘼	𑘭𑘽	𑘭𑘾
𑘮𑘿	𑘮	𑘮𑘰	𑘮𑘱	𑘮𑘲	𑘮𑘳	𑘮𑘴	𑘮𑘵	𑘮𑘶	𑘮𑘷	𑘮𑘸	𑘮𑘹	𑘮𑘺	𑘮𑘻	𑘮𑘼	𑘮𑘽	𑘮𑘾
𑘯𑘿	𑘯	𑘯𑘰	𑘯𑘱	𑘯𑘲	𑘯𑘳	𑘯𑘴	𑘯𑘵	𑘯𑘶	𑘯𑘷	𑘯𑘸	𑘯𑘹	𑘯𑘺	𑘯𑘻	𑘯𑘼	𑘯𑘽	𑘯𑘾
𑘭𑘿𑘪𑘨	𑘀	𑘁	𑘂	𑘃	𑘄	𑘅	𑘆	𑘇	𑘈	𑘉	𑘊	𑘋	𑘌	𑘍	𑘀𑘽	𑘀𑘾

=== Consonant conjuncts ===
In the Mōḍī script, conjunct consonant ligatures are called Jodakshara (Marathi: 𑘕𑘻𑘚𑘰𑘎𑘿𑘬𑘨, romanized: jōḍākṣara). Mōḍī conjuncts follow the same basic principle as Devanagari conjuncts: a virama cancels the inherent vowel of a consonant that precedes another, but their treatment differs in several respects. In most conjuncts, the first consonant is reduced to a half-form (as with ta, sa, ma and da) by removing the distinctive right vertical stem of the leading consonant, and joining the remaining left half horizontally to the subsequent consonant. Some letters also take a contextual form inside a cluster. The letter ra shows the greatest variation in comparison with other Indic scripts.

Example: The conjunct mba can be rendered as:

- 𑘦 + 𑘿 + 𑘤 → 𑘦𑘿𑘤

A conjunct is also written by placing the virama (𑘿) after each consonant in the cluster except the last. The same conjunct mba can thus be written as:

- 𑘦 + 𑘿 + 𑘤 → 𑘎𑘿‌𑘤

Similar to Devanāgarī, only two conjuncts are written as single ligatures: kṣa (𑘎𑘿𑘬) and tra (𑘝𑘿𑘨), whose forms are not clearly derived from their component letter half-forms. However, the Mōḍī equivalent of Devanāgarī, jña (𑘕𑘿𑘗), is written with the half-form of its first consonant.

𑘎𑘿𑘬 ksha IPA: /kʂa/	𑘝𑘿𑘨 tra IPA: /t̪ɾa/	𑘕𑘿𑘗 jña IPA: /d͡ʑɲɐ/

=== Ligation of Ra (𑘨) ===
Like most Indic scripts, the letter consonant /ɾa/ (𑘨) is special because it takes on specialised reduced shapes depending on its position in the consonant cluster. It also takes different visual forms and positions on the word level, which is unique to the Mōḍī script. /ɾa/ keeps its basic shape when written alone. It takes other forms when:

- part of a conjunct
- following a vowel sign or punctuation mark
- following certain letters.

==== Initial /ɾ/ ====
When /ɾ/ is in the initial position in a consonant cluster, it has two forms:

- Repha: When /ɾa/ precedes another consonant like in /ɾma/, it is written as a repha (𑘨𑘹𑘣). In Mōḍī, the repha is a small, curved stroke placed above and slightly to the right of the following consonant.

𑘨𑘿𑘦 rma IPA: /ɾma/	𑘨𑘿𑘞 rtha IPA: /ɾt̪ʰ/	𑘨𑘿𑘐 rg IPA: /ɾɡ/

- Eyelash ra: Eyelash /ɾa/ (𑘀𑘨𑘿𑘠𑘰 𑘨) is used instead of the repha only in native Marathi words, in clusters with ya (𑘨𑘿‍𑘧), and ha (𑘨𑘿‍𑘮). In some cases it marks a palatalised /r/, transliterated as řa.

𑘨𑘿‍𑘧 rya IPA: /ɾja/	𑘨𑘿‍𑘮 rha IPA: /ɾʰa/

The choice between the two is both morphological and phonemic. For example,

Devanagari	Mōḍī	Transliteration	Translation
दऱ्या	𑘟𑘨𑘿‍𑘧𑘰	daryā (/da.ryā/)	valleys
दर्या	𑘟𑘨𑘿𑘧𑘰	daryā (/dar.yā/)	ocean

==== Non-initial /ɾ/ ====
When /ɾ/ is in a non-initial position in a consonant cluster, it has three forms:

- Rakār: When /ɾa/ follows another consonant, as in /kɾa/, it is written as a rakār (𑘨𑘎𑘰𑘨 ). It is usually a short, diagonal stroke attached to the lower half of that stem.

𑘎𑘿𑘨 kra IPA: /kɾa/	𑘢𑘿𑘨 pra IPA: /pɾa/

- Vattu: A subjoined form that attaches to the bottom of the letterform in multisyllabic clusters involving /ɾ/.

𑘬𑘿𑘝𑘿𑘨 ṣtra IPA: /ʂt̪ɾə/	𑘡𑘿𑘎𑘿𑘨 nkra IPA: /nkɾə/

- Ligatures: /ra/ forms the ligature tra (𑘝𑘿𑘨) with /ta/ (𑘝).

𑘝𑘿𑘨
tra
IPA: /t̪ɾa/

==== After a letter or vowel sign ====
Even without a virama, the shape of /ɾa/ depends on the letter or vowel mark that precedes it in a word. This evolved directly from the script's cursive orthography and the need to write characters using rapid continuous strokes without lifting the stylus. The various forms of /ra/ are:

- After ka, sa, and ta, it forms a distinct ligature, so kara looks different from kra and so on. Kāra also has its own ligature.

𑘎𑘿𑘨 kra IPA: /kɾa/	𑘎𑘨 kara IPA: /kaɾa/	𑘎𑘰𑘨 kāra IPA: /kaːɾa/	𑘎𑘨𑘰 karā IPA: /kaɾaː/
𑘭𑘿𑘨 sra IPA: /sɾa/	𑘭𑘨 sara IPA: /saɾa/	𑘭𑘰𑘨 sāra IPA: /saːɾa/	𑘭𑘨𑘰 sarā IPA: /saɾaː/
𑘝𑘿𑘨 tra IPA: /t̪ɾa/	𑘝𑘨 tara IPA: /t̪aɾa/	𑘝𑘰𑘨 tāra IPA: /t̪aːɾa/	𑘝𑘨𑘰 tarā IPA: /t̪aɾaː/

- /ɾa/ takes a special shape after rounded letters such as kha, dha and ha.

𑘏𑘨 khara IPA: /kʰaɾa/	𑘠𑘨 dhara IPA: /dʰaɾa/	𑘮𑘨 hara IPA: /haɾa/	𑘔𑘨 chara IPA: /t͡ɕʰaɾa/
𑘖𑘨 jhara IPA: /d͡ʑʱaɾa/	𑘡𑘨 nara IPA: /naɾa/	𑘙𑘨 tthara IPA: /ʈʰaɾa/	𑘟𑘨 dara IPA: /d̪aɾa/
𑘧𑘨 yara IPA: /jaɾa/	𑘩𑘨 lara IPA: /laɾa/	𑘪𑘨 vara IPA: /vaɾa/	𑘯𑘨 ḷara IPA: /ɭaɾa/

- After some vowel signs, /ɾa/ changes shape, attaches beneath the sign, or fuses with it, depending on the sign.

𑘝𑘰𑘨 tāra IPA: /t̪aːɾa/	𑘜𑘻𑘨 ṇōra IPA: /ɳoːɾə/	𑘐𑘲𑘨 gīra IPA: /ɡiːɾa/	𑘢𑘳𑘨 pura IPA: /puɾa/	𑘢𑘳𑘨𑘹 pure IPA: /puɾe/

- After punctuation marks like a danda (𑙁) or double danda (𑙂), /ɾa/ joins underneath the stroke, and any additional vowel marks are written directly on top of the subjoined /ɾa/. This behaviour is unique to Modi.

𑙁𑘨. ra IPA: /ɾa/	𑙂𑘨. ra IPA: /ɾa/

=== Common Marathi conjuncts ===
The following tables list some of the most common Marathi conjuncts (jōḍākṣara), ordered by their statistical frequency in contemporary written text, along with their Mōḍī equivalents.

Common Marathi conjuncts
Mōḍī	Transliteration	Example	Translation
𑘓𑘿𑘧	cya	𑘑𑘨𑘰𑘓𑘿𑘧𑘰 gharācyā	"of the house"
𑘢𑘿𑘨	pra	𑘢𑘿𑘨𑘎𑘰𑘫 prakāśa	"light"
𑘝𑘿𑘧	tya	𑘭𑘝𑘿𑘧 satya	"truth"
𑘩𑘿𑘧	lya	𑘦𑘳𑘩𑘿𑘧 mūlya	"value"
𑘜𑘿𑘧	ṇya	𑘢𑘳𑘜𑘿𑘧 puṇya	"merit"
𑘝𑘿𑘨	tra	𑘦𑘲𑘝𑘿𑘨 mitra	"friend"
𑘎𑘿𑘬	kṣa	𑘢𑘨𑘲𑘎𑘿𑘬𑘰 parīkṣā	"examination"
𑘦𑘿𑘮	mha	𑘦𑘿𑘮𑘜𑘕𑘹 mhaṇaje	"that is"
𑘪𑘿𑘧	vya	𑘪𑘿𑘧𑘎𑘿𑘝𑘲 vyaktī	"person"
𑘟𑘿𑘠	ddha	𑘧𑘳𑘟𑘿𑘠 yuddha	"war"
𑘨𑘿𑘪	rva	𑘢𑘳𑘨𑘿𑘪 pūrva	"east, former"
𑘟𑘿𑘨	dra	𑘭𑘦𑘳𑘟𑘿𑘨 samudra	"sea"
𑘭𑘿𑘪	sva	𑘭𑘿𑘪𑘝𑘽𑘝𑘿𑘨 svatantra	"independent"
𑘎𑘿𑘝	kta	𑘦𑘳𑘎𑘿𑘝 mukta	"free"
𑘕𑘿𑘗	jña	𑘕𑘿𑘗𑘰𑘡 jñāna	"knowledge"
𑘨𑘿𑘜	rṇa	𑘪𑘨𑘿𑘜 varṇa	"colour, letter"
𑘭𑘿𑘝	sta	𑘨𑘭𑘿𑘝𑘰 rastā	"road"

The eyelash form 𑘨𑘿‍𑘧𑘰 (ryā) is also among the frequent units. Among geminates, 𑘝𑘿𑘝 (tta) is the most frequent, followed by 𑘡𑘿𑘡 (nna), 𑘓𑘿𑘓 (cca) and 𑘟𑘿𑘟 (dda); 𑘩𑘿𑘩 (lla) also occurs among the frequent letters.

Common Marathi geminates
Mōḍī	Transliteration	Example	Translation
𑘝𑘿𑘝	tta	𑘄𑘝𑘿𑘝𑘨 uttara	"answer"
𑘡𑘿𑘡	nna	𑘀𑘡𑘿𑘡 anna	"food"
𑘓𑘿𑘓	cca	𑘄𑘓𑘿𑘓 ucca	"high"
𑘟𑘿𑘟	dda	𑘄𑘟𑘿𑘟𑘹𑘫 uddeśa	"purpose"
𑘩𑘿𑘩	lla	𑘦𑘩𑘿𑘩 malla	"wrestler"

Below is a comprehensive table of all 1156 possible biconsonantal Mōḍī conjunct clusters. Some of the ligated conjuncts may not be viable combinations in any language.

All Mōḍī jōḍākṣara (𑘕𑘻𑘚𑘰𑘎𑘿𑘬𑘨 )
Consonants	𑘎	𑘏	𑘐	𑘑	𑘒	𑘓	𑘔	𑘕	𑘖	𑘗	𑘘	𑘙	𑘚	𑘛	𑘜	𑘝	𑘞	𑘟	𑘠	𑘡	𑘢	𑘣	𑘤	𑘥	𑘦	𑘧	𑘨 (Note: This letter acts as rakār (𑘨𑘎𑘰𑘨 ) diacritic when it is second in a conjunct.)	𑘩	𑘪	𑘫	𑘬	𑘭	𑘮 (Note: Ligated forms like 𑘦𑘿𑘮 /mha/, 𑘡𑘿𑘮 /nha/, 𑘩𑘿𑘮 /lha/, and 𑘪𑘿𑘮 /vha/ are biconsonantal conjuncts combining a nasal or liquid consonant with 𑘮 /h/. But in Marathi phonology, these are considered indivisible aspirated consonants rather than a cluster of two separate sounds, dictating syllabic weight differently than standard conjuncts in Marathi poetry and meter.)	𑘯
𑘎	𑘎𑘿𑘎	𑘎𑘿𑘏	𑘎𑘿𑘐	𑘎𑘿𑘑	𑘎𑘿𑘒	𑘎𑘿𑘓	𑘎𑘿𑘔	𑘎𑘿𑘕	𑘎𑘿𑘖	𑘎𑘿𑘗	𑘎𑘿𑘘	𑘎𑘿𑘙	𑘎𑘿𑘚	𑘎𑘿𑘛	𑘎𑘿𑘜	𑘎𑘿𑘝	𑘎𑘿𑘞	𑘎𑘿𑘟	𑘎𑘿𑘠	𑘎𑘿𑘡	𑘎𑘿𑘢	𑘎𑘿𑘣	𑘎𑘿𑘤	𑘎𑘿𑘥	𑘎𑘿𑘦	𑘎𑘿𑘧	𑘎𑘿𑘨	𑘎𑘿𑘩	𑘎𑘿𑘪	𑘎𑘿𑘫	𑘎𑘿𑘬	𑘎𑘿𑘭	𑘎𑘿𑘮	𑘎𑘿𑘯
𑘏	𑘏𑘿𑘎	𑘏𑘿𑘏	𑘏𑘿𑘐	𑘏𑘿𑘑	𑘏𑘿𑘒	𑘏𑘿𑘓	𑘏𑘿𑘔	𑘏𑘿𑘕	𑘏𑘿𑘖	𑘏𑘿𑘗	𑘏𑘿𑘘	𑘏𑘿𑘙	𑘏𑘿𑘚	𑘏𑘿𑘛	𑘏𑘿𑘜	𑘏𑘿𑘝	𑘏𑘿𑘞	𑘏𑘿𑘟	𑘏𑘿𑘠	𑘏𑘿𑘡	𑘏𑘿𑘢	𑘏𑘿𑘣	𑘏𑘿𑘤	𑘏𑘿𑘥	𑘏𑘿𑘦	𑘏𑘿𑘧	𑘏𑘿𑘨	𑘏𑘿𑘩	𑘏𑘿𑘪	𑘏𑘿𑘫	𑘏𑘿𑘬	𑘏𑘿𑘭	𑘏𑘿𑘮	𑘏𑘿𑘯
𑘐	𑘐𑘿𑘎	𑘐𑘿𑘏	𑘐𑘿𑘐	𑘐𑘿𑘑	𑘐𑘿𑘒	𑘐𑘿𑘓	𑘐𑘿𑘔	𑘐𑘿𑘕	𑘐𑘿𑘖	𑘐𑘿𑘗	𑘐𑘿𑘘	𑘐𑘿𑘙	𑘐𑘿𑘚	𑘐𑘿𑘛	𑘐𑘿𑘜	𑘐𑘿𑘝	𑘐𑘿𑘞	𑘐𑘿𑘟	𑘐𑘿𑘠	𑘐𑘿𑘡	𑘐𑘿𑘢	𑘐𑘿𑘣	𑘐𑘿𑘤	𑘐𑘿𑘥	𑘐𑘿𑘦	𑘐𑘿𑘧	𑘐𑘿𑘨	𑘐𑘿𑘩	𑘐𑘿𑘪	𑘐𑘿𑘫	𑘐𑘿𑘬	𑘐𑘿𑘭	𑘐𑘿𑘮	𑘐𑘿𑘯
𑘑	𑘑𑘿𑘎	𑘑𑘿𑘏	𑘑𑘿𑘐	𑘑𑘿𑘑	𑘑𑘿𑘒	𑘑𑘿𑘓	𑘑𑘿𑘔	𑘑𑘿𑘕	𑘑𑘿𑘖	𑘑𑘿𑘗	𑘑𑘿𑘘	𑘑𑘿𑘙	𑘑𑘿𑘚	𑘑𑘿𑘛	𑘑𑘿𑘜	𑘑𑘿𑘝	𑘑𑘿𑘞	𑘑𑘿𑘟	𑘑𑘿𑘠	𑘑𑘿𑘡	𑘑𑘿𑘢	𑘑𑘿𑘣	𑘑𑘿𑘤	𑘑𑘿𑘥	𑘑𑘿𑘦	𑘑𑘿𑘧	𑘑𑘿𑘨	𑘑𑘿𑘩	𑘑𑘿𑘪	𑘑𑘿𑘫	𑘑𑘿𑘬	𑘑𑘿𑘭	𑘑𑘿𑘮	𑘑𑘿𑘯
𑘒	𑘒𑘿𑘎	𑘒𑘿𑘏	𑘒𑘿𑘐	𑘒𑘿𑘑	𑘒𑘿𑘒	𑘒𑘿𑘓	𑘒𑘿𑘔	𑘒𑘿𑘕	𑘒𑘿𑘖	𑘒𑘿𑘗	𑘒𑘿𑘘	𑘒𑘿𑘙	𑘒𑘿𑘚	𑘒𑘿𑘛	𑘒𑘿𑘜	𑘒𑘿𑘝	𑘒𑘿𑘞	𑘒𑘿𑘟	𑘒𑘿𑘠	𑘒𑘿𑘡	𑘒𑘿𑘢	𑘒𑘿𑘣	𑘒𑘿𑘤	𑘒𑘿𑘥	𑘒𑘿𑘦	𑘒𑘿𑘧	𑘒𑘿𑘨	𑘒𑘿𑘩	𑘒𑘿𑘪	𑘒𑘿𑘫	𑘒𑘿𑘬	𑘒𑘿𑘭	𑘒𑘿𑘮	𑘒𑘿𑘯
𑘓	𑘓𑘿𑘎	𑘓𑘿𑘏	𑘓𑘿𑘐	𑘓𑘿𑘑	𑘓𑘿𑘒	𑘓𑘿𑘓	𑘓𑘿𑘔	𑘓𑘿𑘕	𑘓𑘿𑘖	𑘓𑘿𑘗	𑘓𑘿𑘘	𑘓𑘿𑘙	𑘓𑘿𑘚	𑘓𑘿𑘛	𑘓𑘿𑘜	𑘓𑘿𑘝	𑘓𑘿𑘞	𑘓𑘿𑘟	𑘓𑘿𑘠	𑘓𑘿𑘡	𑘓𑘿𑘢	𑘓𑘿𑘣	𑘓𑘿𑘤	𑘓𑘿𑘥	𑘓𑘿𑘦	𑘓𑘿𑘧	𑘓𑘿𑘨	𑘓𑘿𑘩	𑘓𑘿𑘪	𑘓𑘿𑘫	𑘓𑘿𑘬	𑘓𑘿𑘭	𑘓𑘿𑘮	𑘓𑘿𑘯
𑘔	𑘔𑘿𑘎	𑘔𑘿𑘏	𑘔𑘿𑘐	𑘔𑘿𑘑	𑘔𑘿𑘒	𑘔𑘿𑘓	𑘔𑘿𑘔	𑘔𑘿𑘕	𑘔𑘿𑘖	𑘔𑘿𑘗	𑘔𑘿𑘘	𑘔𑘿𑘙	𑘔𑘿𑘚	𑘔𑘿𑘛	𑘔𑘿𑘜	𑘔𑘿𑘝	𑘔𑘿𑘞	𑘔𑘿𑘟	𑘔𑘿𑘠	𑘔𑘿𑘡	𑘔𑘿𑘢	𑘔𑘿𑘣	𑘔𑘿𑘤	𑘔𑘿𑘥	𑘔𑘿𑘦	𑘔𑘿𑘧	𑘔𑘿𑘨	𑘔𑘿𑘩	𑘔𑘿𑘪	𑘔𑘿𑘫	𑘔𑘿𑘬	𑘔𑘿𑘭	𑘔𑘿𑘮	𑘔𑘿𑘯
𑘕	𑘕𑘿𑘎	𑘕𑘿𑘏	𑘕𑘿𑘐	𑘕𑘿𑘑	𑘕𑘿𑘒	𑘕𑘿𑘓	𑘕𑘿𑘔	𑘕𑘿𑘕	𑘕𑘿𑘖	𑘕𑘿𑘗	𑘕𑘿𑘘	𑘕𑘿𑘙	𑘕𑘿𑘚	𑘕𑘿𑘛	𑘕𑘿𑘜	𑘕𑘿𑘝	𑘕𑘿𑘞	𑘕𑘿𑘟	𑘕𑘿𑘠	𑘕𑘿𑘡	𑘕𑘿𑘢	𑘕𑘿𑘣	𑘕𑘿𑘤	𑘕𑘿𑘥	𑘕𑘿𑘦	𑘕𑘿𑘧	𑘕𑘿𑘨	𑘕𑘿𑘩	𑘕𑘿𑘪	𑘕𑘿𑘫	𑘕𑘿𑘬	𑘕𑘿𑘭	𑘕𑘿𑘮	𑘕𑘿𑘯
𑘖	𑘖𑘿𑘎	𑘖𑘿𑘏	𑘖𑘿𑘐	𑘖𑘿𑘑	𑘖𑘿𑘒	𑘖𑘿𑘓	𑘖𑘿𑘔	𑘖𑘿𑘕	𑘖𑘿𑘖	𑘖𑘿𑘗	𑘖𑘿𑘘	𑘖𑘿𑘙	𑘖𑘿𑘚	𑘖𑘿𑘛	𑘖𑘿𑘜	𑘖𑘿𑘝	𑘖𑘿𑘞	𑘖𑘿𑘟	𑘖𑘿𑘠	𑘖𑘿𑘡	𑘖𑘿𑘢	𑘖𑘿𑘣	𑘖𑘿𑘤	𑘖𑘿𑘥	𑘖𑘿𑘦	𑘖𑘿𑘧	𑘖𑘿𑘨	𑘖𑘿𑘩	𑘖𑘿𑘪	𑘖𑘿𑘫	𑘖𑘿𑘬	𑘖𑘿𑘭	𑘖𑘿𑘮	𑘖𑘿𑘯
𑘗	𑘗𑘿𑘎	𑘗𑘿𑘏	𑘗𑘿𑘐	𑘗𑘿𑘑	𑘗𑘿𑘒	𑘗𑘿𑘓	𑘗𑘿𑘔	𑘗𑘿𑘕	𑘗𑘿𑘖	𑘗𑘿𑘗	𑘗𑘿𑘘	𑘗𑘿𑘙	𑘗𑘿𑘚	𑘗𑘿𑘛	𑘗𑘿𑘜	𑘗𑘿𑘝	𑘗𑘿𑘞	𑘗𑘿𑘟	𑘗𑘿𑘠	𑘗𑘿𑘡	𑘗𑘿𑘢	𑘗𑘿𑘣	𑘗𑘿𑘤	𑘗𑘿𑘥	𑘗𑘿𑘦	𑘗𑘿𑘧	𑘗𑘿𑘨	𑘗𑘿𑘩	𑘗𑘿𑘪	𑘗𑘿𑘫	𑘗𑘿𑘬	𑘗𑘿𑘭	𑘗𑘿𑘮	𑘗𑘿𑘯
𑘘 (Note: This retroflex letter lacks ligated forms.)	𑘘𑘿𑘎	𑘘𑘿𑘏	𑘘𑘿𑘐	𑘘𑘿𑘑	𑘘𑘿𑘒	𑘘𑘿𑘓	𑘘𑘿𑘔	𑘘𑘿𑘕	𑘘𑘿𑘖	𑘘𑘿𑘗	𑘘𑘿𑘘	𑘘𑘿𑘙	𑘘𑘿𑘚	𑘘𑘿𑘛	𑘘𑘿𑘜	𑘘𑘿𑘝	𑘘𑘿𑘞	𑘘𑘿𑘟	𑘘𑘿𑘠	𑘘𑘿𑘡	𑘘𑘿𑘢	𑘘𑘿𑘣	𑘘𑘿𑘤	𑘘𑘿𑘥	𑘘𑘿𑘦	𑘘𑘿𑘧	𑘘𑘿𑘨	𑘘𑘿𑘩	𑘘𑘿𑘪	𑘘𑘿𑘫	𑘘𑘿𑘬	𑘘𑘿𑘭	𑘘𑘿𑘮	𑘘𑘿𑘯
𑘙	𑘙𑘿𑘎	𑘙𑘿𑘏	𑘙𑘿𑘐	𑘙𑘿𑘑	𑘙𑘿𑘒	𑘙𑘿𑘓	𑘙𑘿𑘔	𑘙𑘿𑘕	𑘙𑘿𑘖	𑘙𑘿𑘗	𑘙𑘿𑘘	𑘙𑘿𑘙	𑘙𑘿𑘚	𑘙𑘿𑘛	𑘙𑘿𑘜	𑘙𑘿𑘝	𑘙𑘿𑘞	𑘙𑘿𑘟	𑘙𑘿𑘠	𑘙𑘿𑘡	𑘙𑘿𑘢	𑘙𑘿𑘣	𑘙𑘿𑘤	𑘙𑘿𑘥	𑘙𑘿𑘦	𑘙𑘿𑘧	𑘙𑘿𑘨	𑘙𑘿𑘩	𑘙𑘿𑘪	𑘙𑘿𑘫	𑘙𑘿𑘬	𑘙𑘿𑘭	𑘙𑘿𑘮	𑘙𑘿𑘯
𑘚	𑘚𑘿𑘎	𑘚𑘿𑘏	𑘚𑘿𑘐	𑘚𑘿𑘑	𑘚𑘿𑘒	𑘚𑘿𑘓	𑘚𑘿𑘔	𑘚𑘿𑘕	𑘚𑘿𑘖	𑘚𑘿𑘗	𑘚𑘿𑘘	𑘚𑘿𑘙	𑘚𑘿𑘚	𑘚𑘿𑘛	𑘚𑘿𑘜	𑘚𑘿𑘝	𑘚𑘿𑘞	𑘚𑘿𑘟	𑘚𑘿𑘠	𑘚𑘿𑘡	𑘚𑘿𑘢	𑘚𑘿𑘣	𑘚𑘿𑘤	𑘚𑘿𑘥	𑘚𑘿𑘦	𑘚𑘿𑘧	𑘚𑘿𑘨	𑘚𑘿𑘩	𑘚𑘿𑘪	𑘚𑘿𑘫	𑘚𑘿𑘬	𑘚𑘿𑘭	𑘚𑘿𑘮	𑘚𑘿𑘯
𑘛	𑘛𑘿𑘎	𑘛𑘿𑘏	𑘛𑘿𑘐	𑘛𑘿𑘑	𑘛𑘿𑘒	𑘛𑘿𑘓	𑘛𑘿𑘔	𑘛𑘿𑘕	𑘛𑘿𑘖	𑘛𑘿𑘗	𑘛𑘿𑘘	𑘛𑘿𑘙	𑘛𑘿𑘚	𑘛𑘿𑘛	𑘛𑘿𑘜	𑘛𑘿𑘝	𑘛𑘿𑘞	𑘛𑘿𑘟	𑘛𑘿𑘠	𑘛𑘿𑘡	𑘛𑘿𑘢	𑘛𑘿𑘣	𑘛𑘿𑘤	𑘛𑘿𑘥	𑘛𑘿𑘦	𑘛𑘿𑘧	𑘛𑘿𑘨	𑘛𑘿𑘩	𑘛𑘿𑘪	𑘛𑘿𑘫	𑘛𑘿𑘬	𑘛𑘿𑘭	𑘛𑘿𑘮	𑘛𑘿𑘯
𑘜	𑘜𑘿𑘎	𑘜𑘿𑘏	𑘜𑘿𑘐	𑘜𑘿𑘑	𑘜𑘿𑘒	𑘜𑘿𑘓	𑘜𑘿𑘔	𑘜𑘿𑘕	𑘜𑘿𑘖	𑘜𑘿𑘗	𑘜𑘿𑘘	𑘜𑘿𑘙	𑘜𑘿𑘚	𑘜𑘿𑘛	𑘜𑘿𑘜	𑘜𑘿𑘝	𑘜𑘿𑘞	𑘜𑘿𑘟	𑘜𑘿𑘠	𑘜𑘿𑘡	𑘜𑘿𑘢	𑘜𑘿𑘣	𑘜𑘿𑘤	𑘜𑘿𑘥	𑘜𑘿𑘦	𑘜𑘿𑘧	𑘜𑘿𑘨	𑘜𑘿𑘩	𑘜𑘿𑘪	𑘜𑘿𑘫	𑘜𑘿𑘬	𑘜𑘿𑘭	𑘜𑘿𑘮	𑘜𑘿𑘯
𑘝	𑘝𑘿𑘎	𑘝𑘿𑘏	𑘝𑘿𑘐	𑘝𑘿𑘑	𑘝𑘿𑘒	𑘝𑘿𑘓	𑘝𑘿𑘔	𑘝𑘿𑘕	𑘝𑘿𑘖	𑘝𑘿𑘗	𑘝𑘿𑘘	𑘝𑘿𑘙	𑘝𑘿𑘚	𑘝𑘿𑘛	𑘝𑘿𑘜	𑘝𑘿𑘝	𑘝𑘿𑘞	𑘝𑘿𑘟	𑘝𑘿𑘠	𑘝𑘿𑘡	𑘝𑘿𑘢	𑘝𑘿𑘣	𑘝𑘿𑘤	𑘝𑘿𑘥	𑘝𑘿𑘦	𑘝𑘿𑘧	𑘝𑘿𑘨	𑘝𑘿𑘩	𑘝𑘿𑘪	𑘝𑘿𑘫	𑘝𑘿𑘬	𑘝𑘿𑘭	𑘝𑘿𑘮	𑘝𑘿𑘯
𑘞	𑘞𑘿𑘎	𑘞𑘿𑘏	𑘞𑘿𑘐	𑘞𑘿𑘑	𑘞𑘿𑘒	𑘞𑘿𑘓	𑘞𑘿𑘔	𑘞𑘿𑘕	𑘞𑘿𑘖	𑘞𑘿𑘗	𑘞𑘿𑘘	𑘞𑘿𑘙	𑘞𑘿𑘚	𑘞𑘿𑘛	𑘞𑘿𑘜	𑘞𑘿𑘝	𑘞𑘿𑘞	𑘞𑘿𑘟	𑘞𑘿𑘠	𑘞𑘿𑘡	𑘞𑘿𑘢	𑘞𑘿𑘣	𑘞𑘿𑘤	𑘞𑘿𑘥	𑘞𑘿𑘦	𑘞𑘿𑘧	𑘞𑘿𑘨	𑘞𑘿𑘩	𑘞𑘿𑘪	𑘞𑘿𑘫	𑘞𑘿𑘬	𑘞𑘿𑘭	𑘞𑘿𑘮	𑘞𑘿𑘯
𑘟	𑘟𑘿𑘎	𑘟𑘿𑘏	𑘟𑘿𑘐	𑘟𑘿𑘑	𑘟𑘿𑘒	𑘟𑘿𑘓	𑘟𑘿𑘔	𑘟𑘿𑘕	𑘟𑘿𑘖	𑘟𑘿𑘗	𑘟𑘿𑘘	𑘟𑘿𑘙	𑘟𑘿𑘚	𑘟𑘿𑘛	𑘟𑘿𑘜	𑘟𑘿𑘝	𑘟𑘿𑘞	𑘟𑘿𑘟	𑘟𑘿𑘠	𑘟𑘿𑘡	𑘟𑘿𑘢	𑘟𑘿𑘣	𑘟𑘿𑘤	𑘟𑘿𑘥	𑘟𑘿𑘦	𑘟𑘿𑘧	𑘟𑘿𑘨	𑘟𑘿𑘩	𑘟𑘿𑘪	𑘟𑘿𑘫	𑘟𑘿𑘬	𑘟𑘿𑘭	𑘟𑘿𑘮	𑘟𑘿𑘯
𑘠	𑘠𑘿𑘎	𑘠𑘿𑘏	𑘠𑘿𑘐	𑘠𑘿𑘑	𑘠𑘿𑘒	𑘠𑘿𑘓	𑘠𑘿𑘔	𑘠𑘿𑘕	𑘠𑘿𑘖	𑘠𑘿𑘗	𑘠𑘿𑘘	𑘠𑘿𑘙	𑘠𑘿𑘚	𑘠𑘿𑘛	𑘠𑘿𑘜	𑘠𑘿𑘝	𑘠𑘿𑘞	𑘠𑘿𑘟	𑘠𑘿𑘠	𑘠𑘿𑘡	𑘠𑘿𑘢	𑘠𑘿𑘣	𑘠𑘿𑘤	𑘠𑘿𑘥	𑘠𑘿𑘦	𑘠𑘿𑘧	𑘠𑘿𑘨	𑘠𑘿𑘩	𑘠𑘿𑘪	𑘠𑘿𑘫	𑘠𑘿𑘬	𑘠𑘿𑘭	𑘠𑘿𑘮	𑘠𑘿𑘯
𑘡	𑘡𑘿𑘎	𑘡𑘿𑘏	𑘡𑘿𑘐	𑘡𑘿𑘑	𑘡𑘿𑘒	𑘡𑘿𑘓	𑘡𑘿𑘔	𑘡𑘿𑘕	𑘡𑘿𑘖	𑘡𑘿𑘗	𑘡𑘿𑘘	𑘡𑘿𑘙	𑘡𑘿𑘚	𑘡𑘿𑘛	𑘡𑘿𑘜	𑘡𑘿𑘝	𑘡𑘿𑘞	𑘡𑘿𑘟	𑘡𑘿𑘠	𑘡𑘿𑘡	𑘡𑘿𑘢	𑘡𑘿𑘣	𑘡𑘿𑘤	𑘡𑘿𑘥	𑘡𑘿𑘦	𑘡𑘿𑘧	𑘡𑘿𑘨	𑘡𑘿𑘩	𑘡𑘿𑘪	𑘡𑘿𑘫	𑘡𑘿𑘬	𑘡𑘿𑘭	𑘡𑘿𑘮	𑘡𑘿𑘯
𑘢	𑘢𑘿𑘎	𑘢𑘿𑘏	𑘢𑘿𑘐	𑘢𑘿𑘑	𑘢𑘿𑘒	𑘢𑘿𑘓	𑘢𑘿𑘔	𑘢𑘿𑘕	𑘢𑘿𑘖	𑘢𑘿𑘗	𑘢𑘿𑘘	𑘢𑘿𑘙	𑘢𑘿𑘚	𑘢𑘿𑘛	𑘢𑘿𑘜	𑘢𑘿𑘝	𑘢𑘿𑘞	𑘢𑘿𑘟	𑘢𑘿𑘠	𑘢𑘿𑘡	𑘢𑘿𑘢	𑘢𑘿𑘣	𑘢𑘿𑘤	𑘢𑘿𑘥	𑘢𑘿𑘦	𑘢𑘿𑘧	𑘢𑘿𑘨	𑘢𑘿𑘩	𑘢𑘿𑘪	𑘢𑘿𑘫	𑘢𑘿𑘬	𑘢𑘿𑘭	𑘢𑘿𑘮	𑘢𑘿𑘯
𑘣	𑘣𑘿𑘎	𑘣𑘿𑘏	𑘣𑘿𑘐	𑘣𑘿𑘑	𑘣𑘿𑘒	𑘣𑘿𑘓	𑘣𑘿𑘔	𑘣𑘿𑘕	𑘣𑘿𑘖	𑘣𑘿𑘗	𑘣𑘿𑘘	𑘣𑘿𑘙	𑘣𑘿𑘚	𑘣𑘿𑘛	𑘣𑘿𑘜	𑘣𑘿𑘝	𑘣𑘿𑘞	𑘣𑘿𑘟	𑘣𑘿𑘠	𑘣𑘿𑘡	𑘣𑘿𑘢	𑘣𑘿𑘣	𑘣𑘿𑘤	𑘣𑘿𑘥	𑘣𑘿𑘦	𑘣𑘿𑘧	𑘣𑘿𑘨	𑘣𑘿𑘩	𑘣𑘿𑘪	𑘣𑘿𑘫	𑘣𑘿𑘬	𑘣𑘿𑘭	𑘣𑘿𑘮	𑘣𑘿𑘯
𑘤	𑘤𑘿𑘎	𑘤𑘿𑘏	𑘤𑘿𑘐	𑘤𑘿𑘑	𑘤𑘿𑘒	𑘤𑘿𑘓	𑘤𑘿𑘔	𑘤𑘿𑘕	𑘤𑘿𑘖	𑘤𑘿𑘗	𑘤𑘿𑘘	𑘤𑘿𑘙	𑘤𑘿𑘚	𑘤𑘿𑘛	𑘤𑘿𑘜	𑘤𑘿𑘝	𑘤𑘿𑘞	𑘤𑘿𑘟	𑘤𑘿𑘠	𑘤𑘿𑘡	𑘤𑘿𑘢	𑘤𑘿𑘣	𑘤𑘿𑘤	𑘤𑘿𑘥	𑘤𑘿𑘦	𑘤𑘿𑘧	𑘤𑘿𑘨	𑘤𑘿𑘩	𑘤𑘿𑘪	𑘤𑘿𑘫	𑘤𑘿𑘬	𑘤𑘿𑘭	𑘤𑘿𑘮	𑘤𑘿𑘯
𑘥	𑘥𑘿𑘎	𑘥𑘿𑘏	𑘥𑘿𑘐	𑘥𑘿𑘑	𑘥𑘿𑘒	𑘥𑘿𑘓	𑘥𑘿𑘔	𑘥𑘿𑘕	𑘥𑘿𑘖	𑘥𑘿𑘗	𑘥𑘿𑘘	𑘥𑘿𑘙	𑘥𑘿𑘚	𑘥𑘿𑘛	𑘥𑘿𑘜	𑘥𑘿𑘝	𑘥𑘿𑘞	𑘥𑘿𑘟	𑘥𑘿𑘠	𑘥𑘿𑘡	𑘥𑘿𑘢	𑘥𑘿𑘣	𑘥𑘿𑘤	𑘥𑘿𑘥	𑘥𑘿𑘦	𑘥𑘿𑘧	𑘥𑘿𑘨	𑘥𑘿𑘩	𑘥𑘿𑘪	𑘥𑘿𑘫	𑘥𑘿𑘬	𑘥𑘿𑘭	𑘥𑘿𑘮	𑘥𑘿𑘯
𑘦	𑘦𑘿𑘎	𑘦𑘿𑘏	𑘦𑘿𑘐	𑘦𑘿𑘑	𑘦𑘿𑘒	𑘦𑘿𑘓	𑘦𑘿𑘔	𑘦𑘿𑘕	𑘦𑘿𑘖	𑘦𑘿𑘗	𑘦𑘿𑘘	𑘦𑘿𑘙	𑘦𑘿𑘚	𑘦𑘿𑘛	𑘦𑘿𑘜	𑘦𑘿𑘝	𑘦𑘿𑘞	𑘦𑘿𑘟	𑘦𑘿𑘠	𑘦𑘿𑘡	𑘦𑘿𑘢	𑘦𑘿𑘣	𑘦𑘿𑘤	𑘦𑘿𑘥	𑘦𑘿𑘦	𑘦𑘿𑘧	𑘦𑘿𑘨	𑘦𑘿𑘩	𑘦𑘿𑘪	𑘦𑘿𑘫	𑘦𑘿𑘬	𑘦𑘿𑘭	𑘦𑘿𑘮	𑘦𑘿𑘯
𑘧	𑘧𑘿𑘎	𑘧𑘿𑘏	𑘧𑘿𑘐	𑘧𑘿𑘑	𑘧𑘿𑘒	𑘧𑘿𑘓	𑘧𑘿𑘔	𑘧𑘿𑘕	𑘧𑘿𑘖	𑘧𑘿𑘗	𑘧𑘿𑘘	𑘧𑘿𑘙	𑘧𑘿𑘚	𑘧𑘿𑘛	𑘧𑘿𑘜	𑘧𑘿𑘝	𑘧𑘿𑘞	𑘧𑘿𑘟	𑘧𑘿𑘠	𑘧𑘿𑘡	𑘧𑘿𑘢	𑘧𑘿𑘣	𑘧𑘿𑘤	𑘧𑘿𑘥	𑘧𑘿𑘦	𑘧𑘿𑘧	𑘧𑘿𑘨	𑘧𑘿𑘩	𑘧𑘿𑘪	𑘧𑘿𑘫	𑘧𑘿𑘬	𑘧𑘿𑘭	𑘧𑘿𑘮	𑘧𑘿𑘯
𑘨 (Note: This letter acts as repha (𑘨𑘹𑘣) diacritic when it is first in a conjunct in Sanskrit loanwords, and as Eyelash - Ra (𑘀𑘨𑘿𑘠𑘰 𑘨) in native Marathi words.)	𑘨𑘿𑘎	𑘨𑘿𑘏	𑘨𑘿𑘐	𑘨𑘿𑘑	𑘨𑘿𑘒	𑘨𑘿𑘓	𑘨𑘿𑘔	𑘨𑘿𑘕	𑘨𑘿𑘖	𑘨𑘿𑘗	𑘨𑘿𑘘	𑘨𑘿𑘙	𑘨𑘿𑘚	𑘨𑘿𑘛	𑘨𑘿𑘜	𑘨𑘿𑘝	𑘨𑘿𑘞	𑘨𑘿𑘟	𑘨𑘿𑘠	𑘨𑘿𑘡	𑘨𑘿𑘢	𑘨𑘿𑘣	𑘨𑘿𑘤	𑘨𑘿𑘥	𑘨𑘿𑘦	𑘨𑘿𑘧	𑘨𑘿𑘨	𑘨𑘿𑘩	𑘨𑘿𑘪	𑘨𑘿𑘫	𑘨𑘿𑘬	𑘨𑘿𑘭	𑘨𑘿𑘮	𑘨𑘿𑘯
𑘩	𑘩𑘿𑘎	𑘩𑘿𑘏	𑘩𑘿𑘐	𑘩𑘿𑘑	𑘩𑘿𑘒	𑘩𑘿𑘓	𑘩𑘿𑘔	𑘩𑘿𑘕	𑘩𑘿𑘖	𑘩𑘿𑘗	𑘩𑘿𑘘	𑘩𑘿𑘙	𑘩𑘿𑘚	𑘩𑘿𑘛	𑘩𑘿𑘜	𑘩𑘿𑘝	𑘩𑘿𑘞	𑘩𑘿𑘟	𑘩𑘿𑘠	𑘩𑘿𑘡	𑘩𑘿𑘢	𑘩𑘿𑘣	𑘩𑘿𑘤	𑘩𑘿𑘥	𑘩𑘿𑘦	𑘩𑘿𑘧	𑘩𑘿𑘨	𑘩𑘿𑘩	𑘩𑘿𑘪	𑘩𑘿𑘫	𑘩𑘿𑘬	𑘩𑘿𑘭	𑘩𑘿𑘮	𑘩𑘿𑘯
𑘪	𑘪𑘿𑘎	𑘪𑘿𑘏	𑘪𑘿𑘐	𑘪𑘿𑘑	𑘪𑘿𑘒	𑘪𑘿𑘓	𑘪𑘿𑘔	𑘪𑘿𑘕	𑘪𑘿𑘖	𑘪𑘿𑘗	𑘪𑘿𑘘	𑘪𑘿𑘙	𑘪𑘿𑘚	𑘪𑘿𑘛	𑘪𑘿𑘜	𑘪𑘿𑘝	𑘪𑘿𑘞	𑘪𑘿𑘟	𑘪𑘿𑘠	𑘪𑘿𑘡	𑘪𑘿𑘢	𑘪𑘿𑘣	𑘪𑘿𑘤	𑘪𑘿𑘥	𑘪𑘿𑘦	𑘪𑘿𑘧	𑘪𑘿𑘨	𑘪𑘿𑘩	𑘪𑘿𑘪	𑘪𑘿𑘫	𑘪𑘿𑘬	𑘪𑘿𑘭	𑘪𑘿𑘮	𑘪𑘿𑘯
𑘫	𑘫𑘿𑘎	𑘫𑘿𑘏	𑘫𑘿𑘐	𑘫𑘿𑘑	𑘫𑘿𑘒	𑘫𑘿𑘓	𑘫𑘿𑘔	𑘫𑘿𑘕	𑘫𑘿𑘖	𑘫𑘿𑘗	𑘫𑘿𑘘	𑘫𑘿𑘙	𑘫𑘿𑘚	𑘫𑘿𑘛	𑘫𑘿𑘜	𑘫𑘿𑘝	𑘫𑘿𑘞	𑘫𑘿𑘟	𑘫𑘿𑘠	𑘫𑘿𑘡	𑘫𑘿𑘢	𑘫𑘿𑘣	𑘫𑘿𑘤	𑘫𑘿𑘥	𑘫𑘿𑘦	𑘫𑘿𑘧	𑘫𑘿𑘨	𑘫𑘿𑘩	𑘫𑘿𑘪	𑘫𑘿𑘫	𑘫𑘿𑘬	𑘫𑘿𑘭	𑘫𑘿𑘮	𑘫𑘿𑘯
𑘬	𑘬𑘿𑘎	𑘬𑘿𑘏	𑘬𑘿𑘐	𑘬𑘿𑘑	𑘬𑘿𑘒	𑘬𑘿𑘓	𑘬𑘿𑘔	𑘬𑘿𑘕	𑘬𑘿𑘖	𑘬𑘿𑘗	𑘬𑘿𑘘	𑘬𑘿𑘙	𑘬𑘿𑘚	𑘬𑘿𑘛	𑘬𑘿𑘜	𑘬𑘿𑘝	𑘬𑘿𑘞	𑘬𑘿𑘟	𑘬𑘿𑘠	𑘬𑘿𑘡	𑘬𑘿𑘢	𑘬𑘿𑘣	𑘬𑘿𑘤	𑘬𑘿𑘥	𑘬𑘿𑘦	𑘬𑘿𑘧	𑘬𑘿𑘨	𑘬𑘿𑘩	𑘬𑘿𑘪	𑘬𑘿𑘫	𑘬𑘿𑘬	𑘬𑘿𑘭	𑘬𑘿𑘮	𑘬𑘿𑘯
𑘭	𑘭𑘿𑘎	𑘭𑘿𑘏	𑘭𑘿𑘐	𑘭𑘿𑘑	𑘭𑘿𑘒	𑘭𑘿𑘓	𑘭𑘿𑘔	𑘭𑘿𑘕	𑘭𑘿𑘖	𑘭𑘿𑘗	𑘭𑘿𑘘	𑘭𑘿𑘙	𑘭𑘿𑘚	𑘭𑘿𑘛	𑘭𑘿𑘜	𑘭𑘿𑘝	𑘭𑘿𑘞	𑘭𑘿𑘟	𑘭𑘿𑘠	𑘭𑘿𑘡	𑘭𑘿𑘢	𑘭𑘿𑘣	𑘭𑘿𑘤	𑘭𑘿𑘥	𑘭𑘿𑘦	𑘭𑘿𑘧	𑘭𑘿𑘨	𑘭𑘿𑘩	𑘭𑘿𑘪	𑘭𑘿𑘫	𑘭𑘿𑘬	𑘭𑘿𑘭	𑘭𑘿𑘮	𑘭𑘿𑘯
𑘮	𑘮𑘿𑘎	𑘮𑘿𑘏	𑘮𑘿𑘐	𑘮𑘿𑘑	𑘮𑘿𑘒	𑘮𑘿𑘓	𑘮𑘿𑘔	𑘮𑘿𑘕	𑘮𑘿𑘖	𑘮𑘿𑘗	𑘮𑘿𑘘	𑘮𑘿𑘙	𑘮𑘿𑘚	𑘮𑘿𑘛	𑘮𑘿𑘜	𑘮𑘿𑘝	𑘮𑘿𑘞	𑘮𑘿𑘟	𑘮𑘿𑘠	𑘮𑘿𑘡	𑘮𑘿𑘢	𑘮𑘿𑘣	𑘮𑘿𑘤	𑘮𑘿𑘥	𑘮𑘿𑘦	𑘮𑘿𑘧	𑘮𑘿𑘨	𑘮𑘿𑘩	𑘮𑘿𑘪	𑘮𑘿𑘫	𑘮𑘿𑘬	𑘮𑘿𑘭	𑘮𑘿𑘮	𑘮𑘿𑘯
𑘯	𑘯𑘿𑘎	𑘯𑘿𑘏	𑘯𑘿𑘐	𑘯𑘿𑘑	𑘯𑘿𑘒	𑘯𑘿𑘓	𑘯𑘿𑘔	𑘯𑘿𑘕	𑘯𑘿𑘖	𑘯𑘿𑘗	𑘯𑘿𑘘	𑘯𑘿𑘙	𑘯𑘿𑘚	𑘯𑘿𑘛	𑘯𑘿𑘜	𑘯𑘿𑘝	𑘯𑘿𑘞	𑘯𑘿𑘟	𑘯𑘿𑘠	𑘯𑘿𑘡	𑘯𑘿𑘢	𑘯𑘿𑘣	𑘯𑘿𑘤	𑘯𑘿𑘥	𑘯𑘿𑘦	𑘯𑘿𑘧	𑘯𑘿𑘨	𑘯𑘿𑘩	𑘯𑘿𑘪	𑘯𑘿𑘫	𑘯𑘿𑘬	𑘯𑘿𑘭	𑘯𑘿𑘮	𑘯𑘿𑘯
𑘪𑘿𑘧𑘗𑘿𑘕𑘡	𑘎	𑘏	𑘐	𑘑	𑘒	𑘓	𑘔	𑘕	𑘖	𑘗	𑘘	𑘙	𑘚	𑘛	𑘜	𑘝	𑘞	𑘟	𑘠	𑘡	𑘢	𑘣	𑘤	𑘥	𑘦	𑘧	𑘨	𑘩	𑘪	𑘫	𑘬	𑘭	𑘮	𑘯

== Punctuation ==
Mōḍī also has an empty circle that indicates abbreviations, which may also have been borrowed by Goykanadi, used for writing Konkani, which is closely related to Marathi.

Punctuations
𑙁 danda	𑙂 double danda	𑙃 abbr. sign	𑙄 huva (invocation)

== Numerals ==
Mōḍī has its own set of ten numerals from 0–9.

Digits
𑙐 0	𑙑 1	𑙒 2	𑙓 3	𑙔 4	𑙕 5	𑙖 6	𑙗 7	𑙘 8	𑙙 9

== Usage ==
The Mōḍī script was frequently used as a shorthand script for swift writing in business and administration. Mōḍī was used primarily by administrative people as well as businessmen in keeping their accounts and writing Hundis (credit notes). Mōḍī was also used to encrypt the message since not all people were well-versed in reading this script.

=== Printing ===
Before printing in Marathi was possible, the Mōḍī script was used for writing prose and Balbodh was used for writing poetry. When printing in Marathi became possible, choosing between Mōḍī and Balbodh was a problem. William Carey published the first book on Marathi grammar in 1805 using Balbodh since printing in the Mōḍī script was not available to him in Serampore, Bengal. At the time Marathi books were generally written in Balbodh. However, subsequent editions of William Carey's book on Marathi grammar, starting in 1810, were written in the Mōḍī script. Using offset printing machines (previously Lithography) printing was in vogue.

=== Typing ===
The word Mōḍī in modern Mōḍī font

The Mōḍī script was included in Unicode for the first time in version 7.0. This inclusion has recently led to the development of Unicode fonts for Mōḍī, such as MarathiCursive and Noto Sans Mōḍī. Also, a Unicode keyboard layout for Mōḍī, named Modi (KaGaPa Phonetic)', has been recently added in the XKB keyboard stack, which is mainly used in Linux based operating systems. The character mapping of this keyboard layout is similar to the existing Marathi (KaGaPa Phonetic) layout, but uses Mōḍī's dedicated Unicode block for typing.

== Documents in the Mōḍī script ==
Most documents in Mōḍī are handwritten. The oldest document in the Mōḍī script is from 1389 and is preserved at the Bhārat Itihās Sanshodhan Mandal (BISM) in Pune. The majority of documents and correspondence from before Shivaji Raje Bhonsle's times are written in the Mōḍī script.

Balaji Bajirao's adnyapatra (royal decree) to Tukambhat Jawale Palshikar.

Bajirao's letter to Chimaji Appa

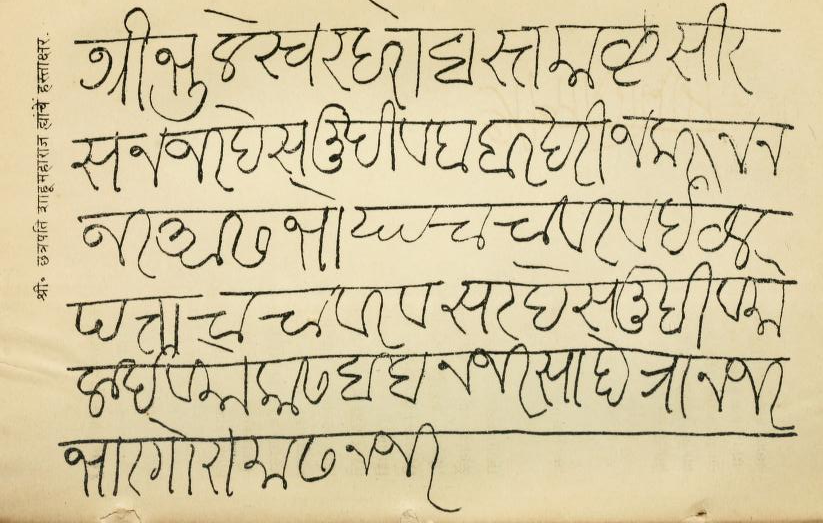
Chh. Shahu I's handwriting in Mōḍī script

Facsimile of the handwriting of Bajirao Ballal

Facsimile of the handwriting of Chimnaji Ballal

Facsimile of the handwriting of Chimnaji Damodar Rajadnya

== Unicode ==
The Mōḍī alphabet (U+11600–U+1165F) was added to the Unicode Standard in June 2014 with the release of version 7.0.

Modi^{[1]}^{[2]} Official Unicode Consortium code chart (PDF)
	0	1	2	3	4	5	6	7	8	9	A	B	C	D	E	F
U+1160x	𑘀	𑘁	𑘂	𑘃	𑘄	𑘅	𑘆	𑘇	𑘈	𑘉	𑘊	𑘋	𑘌	𑘍	𑘎	𑘏
U+1161x	𑘐	𑘑	𑘒	𑘓	𑘔	𑘕	𑘖	𑘗	𑘘	𑘙	𑘚	𑘛	𑘜	𑘝	𑘞	𑘟
U+1162x	𑘠	𑘡	𑘢	𑘣	𑘤	𑘥	𑘦	𑘧	𑘨	𑘩	𑘪	𑘫	𑘬	𑘭	𑘮	𑘯
U+1163x	𑘰	𑘱	𑘲	𑘳	𑘴	𑘵	𑘶	𑘷	𑘸	𑘹	𑘺	𑘻	𑘼	𑘽	𑘾	𑘿
U+1164x	𑙀	𑙁	𑙂	𑙃	𑙄											
U+1165x	𑙐	𑙑	𑙒	𑙓	𑙔	𑙕	𑙖	𑙗	𑙘	𑙙						
Notes 1.As of Unicode version 18.0 2.Grey areas indicate non-assigned code points

== Sample text ==
Mōḍī

𑘦𑘰𑘖𑘰 𑘦𑘨𑘰𑘙𑘲𑘓𑘲 𑘤𑘻𑘩𑘳 𑘎𑘼𑘝𑘳𑘎𑘹𑙁 𑘢𑘨𑘲 𑘀𑘦𑘵𑘝𑘰𑘝𑘹𑘮𑘱 𑘢𑘺𑘕𑘰𑘭𑘲 𑘕𑘲𑘽𑘎𑘹𑙁 𑘋𑘭𑘲 𑘀𑘎𑘿𑘬𑘨𑘹 𑘨𑘭𑘲𑘎𑘹𑙁 𑘦𑘹𑘯𑘪𑘲𑘡𑙂

-Dnyaneshwar

Devanagari (Balbodh)

माझा मराठीची बोलू कौतुके। परि अमृतातेहि पैजासी जिंके। ऐसी अक्षरे रसिके। मेळवीन॥

-संत ज्ञानेश्वर

Roman (IAST)

mājhā marāṭhīcī bolū kautuke| pari amṛtātehi paijāsī jiṃke| aisī akṣare rasike| mel̤avīna||

-saṃta jñāneśvara

== Gallery ==
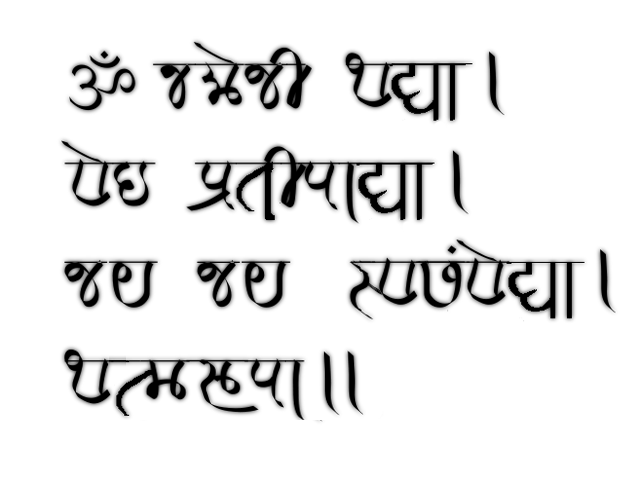
A verse from the Dnyaneshwari in the Mōḍī script

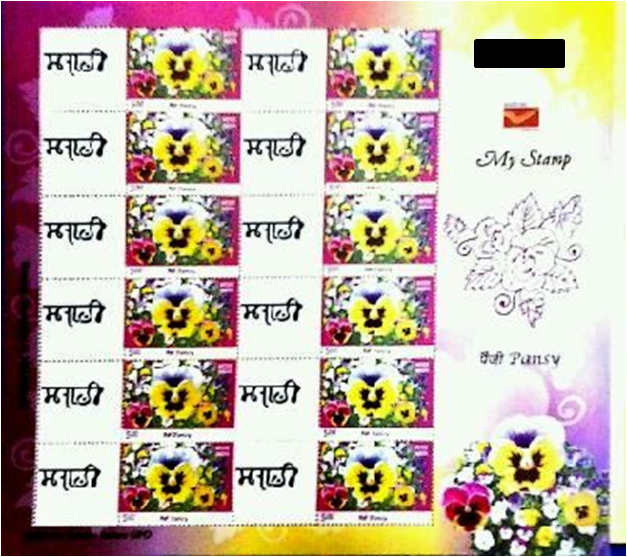
An effort to conserve the Mōḍī Script under India Post's My Stamp scheme. Here, the word 'Marathi' is printed in the Mōḍī script.

== See also ==
- Balbodh
- Cursive
