= Modi (Unicode block) =

- Range: U+11600..U+1165F (96 code points)
- Plane: SMP
- Scripts: Modi
- Major alphabets: Marathi
- Assigned: 79 code points
- Unused: 17 reserved code points

Unicode version history
- 7.0 (2014): 79 (+79)

Unicode documentation
- Code chart ∣ Web page

Modi is a Unicode block containing the Modi alphabet characters for writing the Marathi language.

Modi^{[1]}^{[2]} Official Unicode Consortium code chart (PDF)
	0	1	2	3	4	5	6	7	8	9	A	B	C	D	E	F
U+1160x	𑘀	𑘁	𑘂	𑘃	𑘄	𑘅	𑘆	𑘇	𑘈	𑘉	𑘊	𑘋	𑘌	𑘍	𑘎	𑘏
U+1161x	𑘐	𑘑	𑘒	𑘓	𑘔	𑘕	𑘖	𑘗	𑘘	𑘙	𑘚	𑘛	𑘜	𑘝	𑘞	𑘟
U+1162x	𑘠	𑘡	𑘢	𑘣	𑘤	𑘥	𑘦	𑘧	𑘨	𑘩	𑘪	𑘫	𑘬	𑘭	𑘮	𑘯
U+1163x	𑘰	𑘱	𑘲	𑘳	𑘴	𑘵	𑘶	𑘷	𑘸	𑘹	𑘺	𑘻	𑘼	𑘽	𑘾	𑘿
U+1164x	𑙀	𑙁	𑙂	𑙃	𑙄											
U+1165x	𑙐	𑙑	𑙒	𑙓	𑙔	𑙕	𑙖	𑙗	𑙘	𑙙						
Notes: 1. As of Unicode version 16.0; 2. Grey areas indicate non-assigned code points

== History ==
The following Unicode-related documents record the purpose and process of defining specific characters in the Modi block:

Version	Final code points (Note: Proposed code points and characters names may differ from final code points and names)	Count	L2 ID	WG2 ID	Document
7.0	U+11600..11644, 11650..11659	79	L2/09-249R		Pandey, Anshuman (2009-09-15), Preliminary proposal to encode the Modi script in ISO/IEC 10646
7.0	U+11600..11644, 11650..11659	79	L2/10-084	N3780	Pandey, Anshuman (2010-02-24), Revised Code Chart and Names List for the Modi Script
7.0	U+11600..11644, 11650..11659	79	L2/11-403		Anderson, Deborah; McGowan, Rick; Whistler, Ken (2011-10-26), "III. MODI", Review of Indic-related L2 documents and Recommendations to the UTC
7.0	U+11600..11644, 11650..11659	79	L2/11-330	N4181	Anderson, Deborah (2011-11-04), Proposed Additions to ISO/IEC 10646
7.0	U+11600..11644, 11650..11659	79	L2/11-212R2	N4034	Pandey, Anshuman (2011-11-05), Proposal to Encode the Modi Script in ISO/IEC 10646
7.0	U+11600..11644, 11650..11659	79	L2/11-353		Moore, Lisa (2011-11-30), "D.3", UTC #129 / L2 #226 Minutes
7.0	U+11600..11644, 11650..11659	79		N4253 (pdf, doc)	"M59.10", Unconfirmed minutes of WG 2 meeting 59, 2012-09-12
