= Conjunct consonant =

Type of letter in Brahmic scripts

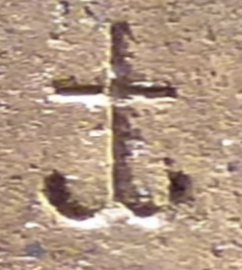
"Kya" (Ka+Ya) conjunct consonant in the Brahmi script, consisting in the vertical assembly of consonants "Ka" and "Ya". Used in the spelling of the word "Shakyamuni" to designate the Buddha, Rummindei pillar of Ashoka (c. 250 BCE).

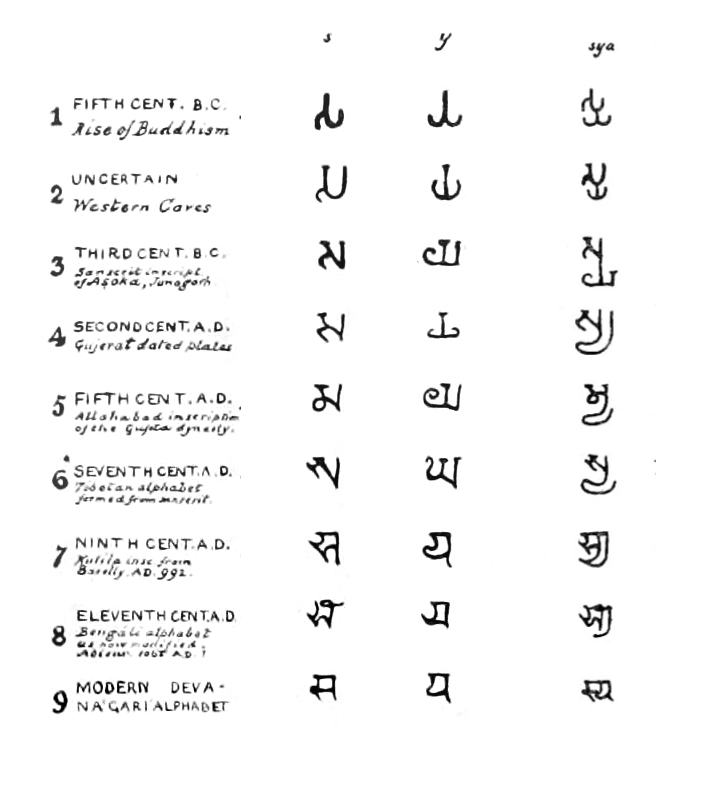
Evolution of the conjunct consonant "Sya" (Sa+Ya) in Brahmic scripts.

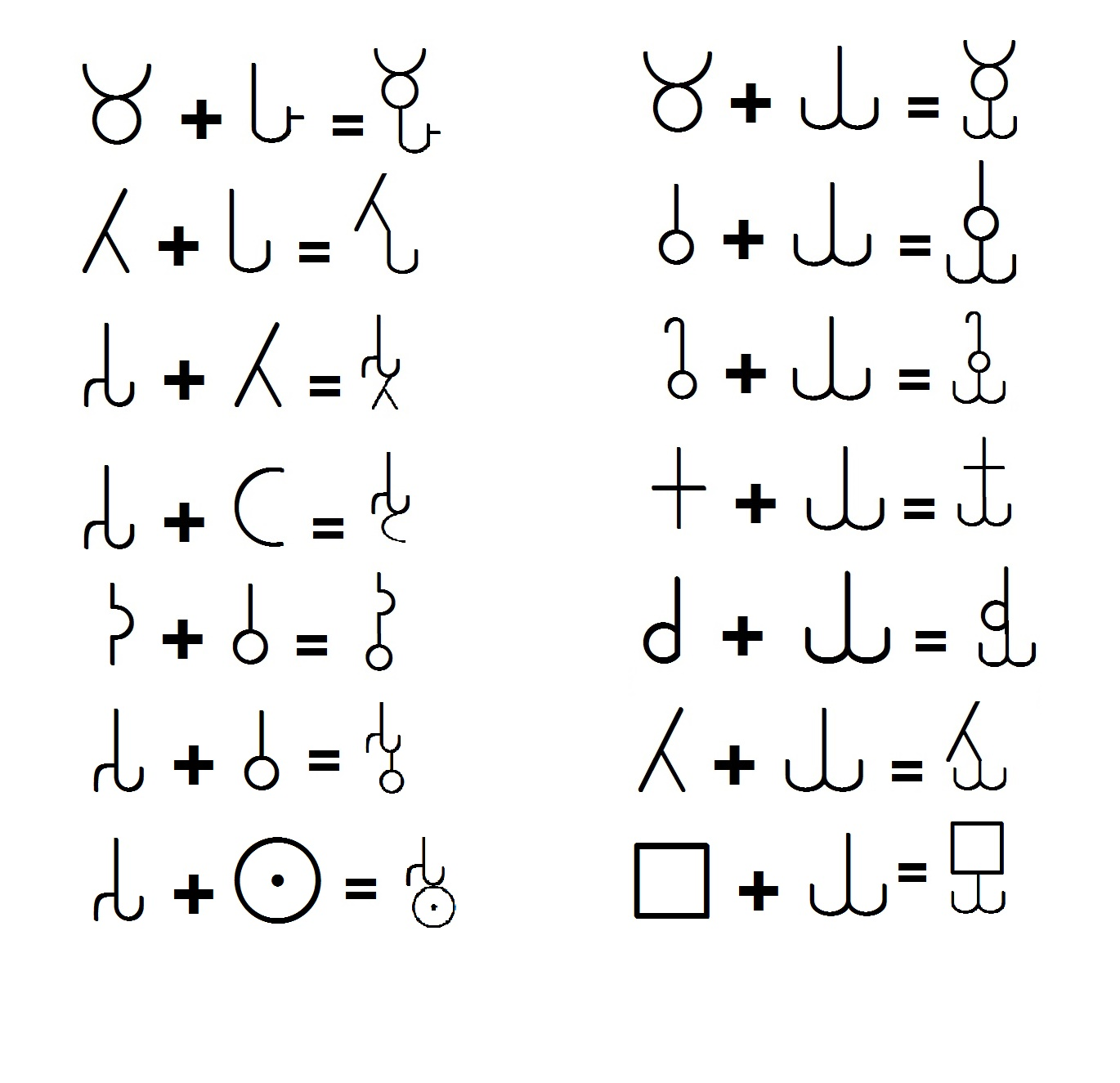
Some major conjunct consonants in the Brahmi script.

Conjunct consonants are a type of letters that is used, for example, in Brahmi or its derived modern scripts such as Balinese, Bengali, Devanagari, Gujarati, Tibetan and Dzongkha to write consonant clusters such as /pr/ or /rv/. Although letters are formed usually by using a simple consonant with the inherent value vowel "a" (as with "k", pronounced "ka" in Brahmi), or by combining a consonant with an vowel in the form of a diacritic (as with "ki" in Brahmi), the use of conjunct consonant permits the creation of more sophisticated sounds (as with "kya", formed with the consonants "k" and "y" assembled vertically). Conjuncts are often used with loan words. Native words typically use the basic consonant, and native speakers know to suppress the vowel.

In modern Devanagari the components of a conjunct are written left to right when possible (when the first consonant has a vertical stem that can be removed at the right), but in Brahmi characters, they are joined vertically downwards.

Some simple examples of conjunct consonants in Devanagari are त + व = त्व (tva), ण + ढ = ण्ढ (ṇḍha), स + थ = स्थ (stha), where the vertical stroke of the first letter is simply lost in the combination. Sometimes, conjunct consonants are not clearly derived from the letters making up their components: the conjunct for kṣ is क्ष (क् + ष) and for jñ it is ज्ञ (ज् + ञ).

Some examples of conjunct consonants in Gujarati are પ + ઝ = પ્ઝ (pjha) (where a stroke of the first letter is lost in the combination), હ + ળ = હ્ળ (hḷa), જ + ભ = જ્ભ (jbha). Sometimes, conjunct consonants are not clearly derived from the letters making up their components: the conjunct for śc is શ્ચ (શ્ + ચ) and for ñj it is ઞ્જ (ઞ્ + જ).

Conjunct consonants are used in many other scripts as well, most of which are derived from the Brahmi script. In Balinese, conjunct consonants are called Haksara Wrehastra.

== See also ==
- Devanagari conjuncts
- Consonant stacking
