= Ma (Indic) =

Letter "Ma" in Indic scripts

Example glyphs
- Bengali–Assamese: Ma
- Tibetan: Ma
- Tamil: Ma
- Thai: ม
- Malayalam: മ
- Sinhala: ම
- Ashoka Brahmi: Ma
- Devanagari: Ma

Cognates
- Hebrew: מ ,ם
- Greek: Μ
- Latin: M
- Cyrillic: М

Properties
- Phonemic representation: /m/
- IAST transliteration: m M
- ISCII code point: CC (204)

Ma is a consonant of Indic abugidas. In modern Indic scripts, Ma is derived from the early "Ashoka" Brahmi letter after having gone through the Gupta letter.

== Āryabhaṭa numeration ==
Aryabhata used Devanagari letters for numbers, very similar to the Greek numerals, even after the invention of Indian numerals. The values of the different forms of म are:

- म [mə] = 25 (२५)
- मि [mɪ] = 2,500 (२ ५००)
- मु [mʊ] = 250,000 (२ ५० ०००)
- मृ [mri] = 25,000,000 (२ ५० ०० ०००)
- मॢ [mlə] = 25×10^{8} (२५×१०^{८})
- मे [me] = 25×10^{10} (२५×१०^{१०})
- मै [mɛː] = 25×10^{12} (२५×१०^{१२})
- मो [moː] = 25×10^{14} (२५×१०^{१४})
- मौ [mɔː] = 25×10^{16} (२५×१०^{१६})

== Historic Ma ==
There are three different general early historic scripts - Brahmi and its variants, Kharoṣṭhī, and Tocharian, the so-called slanting Brahmi. Ma as found in standard Brahmi, was a simple geometric shape, with variations toward more flowing forms by the Gupta. The Tocharian Ma had an alternate Fremdzeichen form,. The third form of ma, in Kharoshthi was probably derived from Aramaic separately from the Brahmi letter.

=== Brahmi Ma ===
The Brahmi letter, Ma, is probably derived from the Aramaic Mem, and is thus related to the modern Latin M and Greek Mu. Several identifiable styles of writing the Brahmi Ma can be found, most associated with a specific set of inscriptions from an artifact or diverse records from an historic period. As the earliest and most geometric style of Brahmi, the letters found on the Edicts of Ashoka and other records from around that time are normally the reference form for Brahmi letters, with vowel marks not attested until later forms of Brahmi back-formed to match the geometric writing style.

Brahmi Ma historic forms
Ashoka (3rd-1st c. BCE)	Girnar (~150 BCE)	Kushana (~150-250 CE)	Gujarat (~250 CE)	Gupta (~350 CE)

=== Tocharian Ma ===
The Tocharian letter is derived from the Brahmi, and has an alternate Fremdzeichen form used in conjuncts and as an alternate representation of Mä.

Tocharian Ma with vowel marks
Ma	Mā	Mi	Mī	Mu	Mū	Mr	Mr̄	Me	Mai	Mo	Mau	Mä	Fremdzeichen

=== Kharoṣṭhī Ma ===
The Kharoṣṭhī letter is generally accepted as being derived from the Aramaic Mem, and is thus related to M and Mu, in addition to the Brahmi Ma.

== Devanagari Ma ==
Ma (म) is a consonant of the Devanagari abugida. It ultimately arose from the Brahmi letter, after having gone through the Gupta letter. Letters that derive from it are the Gujarati letter મ, and the Modi letter 𑘦.

=== Devanagari-using Languages ===
In all languages, म is pronounced as [mə] or [m] when appropriate. Like all Indic scripts, Devanagari uses vowel marks attached to the base consonant to override the inherent /ə/ vowel:

Devanagari म with vowel marks
Ma	Mā	Mi	Mī	Mu	Mū	Mr	Mr̄	Ml	Ml̄	Me	Mai	Mo	Mau	M
म	मा	मि	मी	मु	मू	मृ	मॄ	मॢ	मॣ	मे	मै	मो	मौ	म्

=== Conjuncts with म ===
Half form of Ma.

Devanagari exhibits conjunct ligatures, as is common in Indic scripts. In modern Devanagari texts, most conjuncts are formed by reducing the letter shape to fit tightly to the following letter, usually by dropping a character's vertical stem, sometimes referred to as a "half form". Some conjunct clusters are always represented by a true ligature, instead of a shape that can be broken into constituent independent letters. Vertically stacked conjuncts are ubiquitous in older texts, while only a few are still used routinely in modern Devanagari texts. The use of ligatures and vertical conjuncts may vary across languages using the Devanagari script, with Marathi in particular preferring the use of half forms where texts in other languages would show ligatures and vertical stacks.

==== Ligature conjuncts of म ====
True ligatures are quite rare in Indic scripts. The most common ligated conjuncts in Devanagari are in the form of a slight mutation to fit in context or as a consistent variant form appended to the adjacent characters. Those variants include Na and the Repha and Rakar forms of Ra. Nepali and Marathi texts use the "eyelash" Ra half form for an initial "R" instead of repha.

- Repha र্ (r) + म (ma) gives the ligature rma: ^{note}

- Eyelash र্ (r) + म (ma) gives the ligature rma:

- म্ (m) + न (na) gives the ligature mna:

- म্ (m) + rakar र (ra) gives the ligature mra:

==== Stacked conjuncts of म ====
Vertically stacked ligatures are the most common conjunct forms found in Devanagari text. Although the constituent characters may need to be stretched and moved slightly in order to stack neatly, stacked conjuncts can be broken down into recognizable base letters, or a letter and an otherwise standard ligature. As a trailing letter in conjuncts, Ma stretches its shape to a much greater extent than other Devanagari letters.

- छ্ (c^{h}) + म (ma) gives the ligature c^{h}ma:

- ढ্ (ḍʱ) + म (ma) gives the ligature ḍʱma:

- द্ (d) + ध্ (dʱ) + म (ma) gives the ligature ddʱma:

- ड্ (ḍ) + म (ma) gives the ligature ḍma:

- द্ (d) + म (ma) gives the ligature dma:

- ह্ (h) + म (ma) gives the ligature hma:

- म্ (m) + च (ca) gives the ligature mca:

- म্ (m) + ड (ḍa) gives the ligature mḍa:

- म্ (m) + ज (ja) gives the ligature mja:

- म্ (m) + ज্ (j) + ञ (ña) gives the ligature mjña:

- म্ (m) + ल (la) gives the ligature mla:

- म্ (m) + ङ (ŋa) gives the ligature mŋa:

- म্ (m) + ञ (ña) gives the ligature mña:

- ङ্ (ŋ) + म (ma) gives the ligature ŋma:

- ठ্ (ṭ^{h}) + म (ma) gives the ligature ṭ^{h}ma:

- ट্ (ṭ) + म (ma) gives the ligature ṭma:

== Bengali Ma ==
The Bengali script ম is derived from the Siddhaṃ, and is marked by a similar horizontal head line, but less geometric shape, than its Devanagari counterpart, म. The inherent vowel of Bengali consonant letters is /ɔ/, so the bare letter ম will sometimes be transliterated as "mo" instead of "ma". Adding okar, the "o" vowel mark, gives a reading of /mo/. Like all Indic consonants, ম can be modified by marks to indicate another (or no) vowel than its inherent "a".

Bengali ম with vowel marks
ma	mā	mi	mī	mu	mū	mr	mr̄	me	mai	mo	mau	m
ম	মা	মি	মী	মু	মূ	মৃ	মৄ	মে	মৈ	মো	মৌ	ম্

=== ম in Bengali-using languages ===
ম is used as a basic consonant character in all of the major Bengali script orthographies, including Bengali and Assamese.

=== Conjuncts with ম ===
Bengali ম exhibits conjunct ligatures, as is common in Indic scripts, with a tendency towards stacked ligatures. Unlike most conjoined letters that stack, ম will retain a full vertical stem as a trailing consonant, connecting all the way to the head line to the right of leading consonants.

- ধ্ (dʱ) + ম (ma) gives the ligature dʱma:

- দ্ (d) + ম (ma) gives the ligature dma:

- গ্ (g) + ম (ma) gives the ligature gma:

- ক্ (k) + ম (ma) gives the ligature kma:

- ক্ (k) + ষ্ (ṣ) + ম (ma) gives the ligature kṣma:

- ক্ (k) + শ্ (ʃ) + ম্ (m) + য (ya) gives the ligature kʃmya, with the ya phala suffix:

- ল্ (l) + ম (ma) gives the ligature lma:

- ম্ (m) + ভ (b^{h}a) gives the ligature mb^{h}a:

- ম্ (m) + ভ্ (b^{h}) + র (ra) gives the ligature mb^{h}ra, with the ra phala suffix:

- ম্ (m) + ল (la) gives the ligature mla:

- ম্ (m) + ম (ma) gives the ligature mma:

- ম্ (m) + ন (na) gives the ligature mna:

- ম্ (m) + প (pa) gives the ligature mpa:

- ম্ (m) + ফ (p^{h}a) gives the ligature mp^{h}a:

- ম্ (m) + প্ (p) + র (ra) gives the ligature mpra, with the ra phala suffix:

- ম্ (m) + র (ra) gives the ligature mra, with the ra phala suffix:

- ম্ (m) + ব (va) gives the ligature mva, with the va phala suffix:

- ম্ (m) + ব্ (v) + র (ra) gives the ligature mvra, with the ra phala suffix:

- ম্ (m) + য (ya) gives the ligature mya, with the ya phala suffix:

- ঙ্ (ŋ) + ম (ma) gives the ligature ŋma:

- ন্ (n) + ম (ma) gives the ligature nma:

- ণ্ (ṇ) + ম (ma) gives the ligature ṇma:

- র্ (r) + ম (ma) gives the ligature rma, with the repha prefix:

- র্ (r) + ম্ (m) + য (ya) gives the ligature rmya, with the repha prefix and ya phala suffix:

- শ্ (ʃ) + ম (ma) gives the ligature ʃma:

- স্ (s) + ম (ma) gives the ligature sma:

- ষ্ (ṣ) + ম (ma) gives the ligature ṣma:

- ত্ (t) + ম (ma) gives the ligature tma:

- ত্ (t) + ম্ (m) + য (ya) gives the ligature tmya, with the ya phala suffix:

- ট্ (ṭ) + ম (ma) gives the ligature ṭma:

== Gujarati Ma ==
Gujarati Ma.

Ma (મ) is the twenty-fifth consonant of the Gujarati abugida. It is derived from the Devanagari Ma with the top bar (shiro rekha) removed, and ultimately the Brahmi letter.

=== Gujarati-using Languages ===
The Gujarati script is used to write the Gujarati and Kutchi languages. In both languages, મ is pronounced as [mə] or [m] when appropriate. Like all Indic scripts, Gujarati uses vowel marks attached to the base consonant to override the inherent /ə/ vowel:

Ma	Mā	Mi	Mī	Mu	Mū	Mr	Ml	Mr̄	Ml̄	Mĕ	Me	Mai	Mŏ	Mo	Mau	M
Gujarati Ma syllables, with vowel marks in red.

=== Conjuncts with મ ===
Half form of Ma.

Gujarati મ exhibits conjunct ligatures, much like its parent Devanagari Script. Most Gujarati conjuncts can only be formed by reducing the letter shape to fit tightly to the following letter, usually by dropping a character's vertical stem, sometimes referred to as a "half form". A few conjunct clusters can be represented by a true ligature, instead of a shape that can be broken into constituent independent letters, and vertically stacked conjuncts can also be found in Gujarati, although much less commonly than in Devanagari. True ligatures are quite rare in Indic scripts. The most common ligated conjuncts in Gujarati are in the form of a slight mutation to fit in context or as a consistent variant form appended to the adjacent characters. Those variants include Na and the Repha and Rakar forms of Ra.

- ર્ (r) + મ (ma) gives the ligature RMa:

- મ્ (m) + ર (ra) gives the ligature MRa:

- દ્ (d) + મ (ma) gives the ligature DMa:

- મ્ (m) + ન (na) gives the ligature MNa:

== Telugu Ma ==
Telugu independent and subjoined Ma.

Ma (మ) is a consonant of the Telugu abugida. It ultimately arose from the Brahmi letter. It is closely related to the Kannada letter ಮ. Most Telugu consonants contain a v-shaped headstroke that is related to the horizontal headline found in other Indic scripts, although headstrokes do not connect adjacent letters in Telugu. The headstroke is normally lost when adding vowel matras. Telugu conjuncts are created by reducing trailing letters to a subjoined form that appears below the initial consonant of the conjunct. Many subjoined forms are created by dropping their headline, with many extending the end of the stroke of the main letter body to form an extended tail reaching up to the right of the preceding consonant. This subjoining of trailing letters to create conjuncts is in contrast to the leading half forms of Devanagari and Bengali letters. Ligature conjuncts are not a feature in Telugu, with the only non-standard construction being an alternate subjoined form of Ṣa (borrowed from Kannada) in the KṢa conjunct.

== Malayalam Ma ==
Malayalam letter Ma

Ma (മ) is a consonant of the Malayalam abugida. It ultimately arose from the Brahmi letter, via the Grantha letter Ma. Like in other Indic scripts, Malayalam consonants have the inherent vowel "a", and take one of several modifying vowel signs to represent syllables with another vowel or no vowel at all.

Malayalam Ma matras: Ma, Mā, Mi, Mī, Mu, Mū, Mr̥, Mr̥̄, Ml̥, Ml̥̄, Me, Mē, Mai, Mo, Mō, Mau, and M.

=== Conjuncts of മ ===
Malayalam letter Chillu M

As is common in Indic scripts, Malayalam joins letters together to form conjunct consonant clusters. There are several ways in which conjuncts are formed in Malayalam texts: using a post-base form of a trailing consonant placed under the initial consonant of a conjunct, a combined ligature of two or more consonants joined together, a conjoining form that appears as a combining mark on the rest of the conjunct, the use of an explicit candrakkala mark to suppress the inherent "a" vowel, or a special consonant form called a "chillu" letter, representing a bare consonant without the inherent "a" vowel. Texts written with the modern reformed Malayalam orthography, put̪iya lipi, may favor more regular conjunct forms than older texts in paḻaya lipi, due to changes undertaken in the 1970s by the Government of Kerala.

- മ് (m) + പ (pa) gives the ligature mpa:

- ക് (k) + മ (ma) gives the ligature kma:

- ഗ് (g) + മ (ma) gives the ligature gma:

- ണ് (ṇ) + മ (ma) gives the ligature ṇma:

- ത് (t) + മ (ma) gives the ligature tma:

- ന് (n) + മ (ma) gives the ligature nma:

- മ് (m) + മ (ma) gives the ligature mma:

- ശ് (ʃ) + മ (ma) gives the ligature ʃma:

- ഷ് (ṣ) + മ (ma) gives the ligature ṣma:

- സ് (s) + മ (ma) gives the ligature sma:

- ഹ് (h) + മ (ma) gives the ligature hma:

- ക് (k) + ഷ് (ṣ) + മ (ma) gives the ligature kṣma:

== Canadian Aboriginal Syllabics Me ==
ᒣ, ᒥ, ᒧ and ᒪ are the base characters "Me", "Mi", "Mo" and "Ma" in the Canadian Aboriginal Syllabics. The bare consonant ᒻ (M) is a small version of the A-series letter ᒪ, although the Western Cree letter ᒼ, derived from Pitman shorthand was the original bare consonant symbol for M. The character ᒣ is derived from a handwritten form of the Devanagari letter म, without the headline or vertical stem, and the forms for different vowels are derived by mirroring. Unlike most writing systems without legacy computer encodings, complex Canadian syllabic letters are represented in Unicode with pre-composed characters, rather than with base characters and diacritical marks.

Variant	E-series		I-series		O-series		A-series			Other
M + vowel	ᒣ		ᒥ		ᒧ		ᒪ			ᢺ
M + vowel	Me		Mi		Mo		Ma			May
Small	-		ᣘ		ᒽ		ᒻ			ᒼ
Small	-		Ojibway M		Mh		M			Cree M
M with long vowels	-		ᒦ		ᒨ	ᒩ	ᒫ			ᒤ
M with long vowels	-		Mī		Mō	Cree Mō	Mā			Māi
M + W-vowels	ᒬ	ᒭ	ᒮ	ᒯ	ᒲ	ᒳ	ᒶ		ᒷ	-
M + W-vowels	Mwe	Cree Mwe	Mwi	Cree Mwi	Mwo	Cree Mwo	Mwa		Cree Mwa	-
M + long W-vowels	-		ᒰ	ᒱ	ᒴ	ᒵ	ᒸ	ᒺ	ᒹ	-
M + long W-vowels	-		Mwī	Cree Mwī	Mwō	Cree Mwō	Mwā	Naskapi Mwā	Cree Mwā	-

== Odia Ma ==
Odia independent and subjoined letter Ma.

Ma (ମ) is a consonant of the Odia abugida. It ultimately arose from the Brahmi letter, via the Siddhaṃ letter Ma. Like in other Indic scripts, Odia consonants have the inherent vowel "a", and take one of several modifying vowel signs to represent syllables with another vowel or no vowel at all.

Odia Ma with vowel matras
Ma	Mā	Mi	Mī	Mu	Mū	Mr̥	Mr̥̄	Ml̥	Ml̥̄	Me	Mai	Mo	Mau	M
ମ	ମା	ମି	ମୀ	ମୁ	ମୂ	ମୃ	ମୄ	ମୢ	ମୣ	ମେ	ମୈ	ମୋ	ମୌ	ମ୍

=== Conjuncts of ମ ===
As is common in Indic scripts, Odia joins letters together to form conjunct consonant clusters. The most common conjunct formation is achieved by using a small subjoined form of trailing consonants. Most consonants' subjoined forms are identical to the full form, just reduced in size, although a few drop the curved headline or have a subjoined form not directly related to the full form of the consonant.The subjoined form of Ma is one of these mismatched forms, and is referred to as "Ma Phala". The second type of conjunct formation is through pure ligatures, where the constituent consonants are written together in a single graphic form. This ligature may be recognizable as being a combination of two characters or it can have a conjunct ligature unrelated to its constituent characters.

- ମ୍ (m) + ଭ (b^{h}a) gives the ligature mb^{h}a:

- ମ୍ (m) + ପ (pa) gives the ligature mpa:

- ମ୍ (m) + ଫ (p^{h}a) gives the ligature mp^{h}a:

- ମ୍ (m) + ମ (ma) gives the ligature mma:

== Kaithi Ma ==
Kaithi consonant and half-form Ma.

Ma (𑂧) is a consonant of the Kaithi abugida. It ultimately arose from the Brahmi letter, via the Siddhaṃ letter Ma. Like in other Indic scripts, Kaithi consonants have the inherent vowel "a", and take one of several modifying vowel signs to represent syllables with another vowel or no vowel at all.

Kaithi Ma with vowel matras
Ma	Mā	Mi	Mī	Mu	Mū	Me	Mai	Mo	Mau	M
𑂧	𑂧𑂰	𑂧𑂱	𑂧𑂲	𑂧𑂳	𑂧𑂴	𑂧𑂵	𑂧𑂶	𑂧𑂷	𑂧𑂸	𑂧𑂹

=== Conjuncts of 𑂧 ===
As is common in Indic scripts, Kaithi joins letters together to form conjunct consonant clusters. The most common conjunct formation is achieved by using a half form of preceding consonants, although several consonants use an explicit virama. Most half forms are derived from the full form by removing the vertical stem. As is common in most Indic scripts, conjuncts of ra are indicated with a repha or rakar mark attached to the rest of the consonant cluster. In addition, there are a few vertical conjuncts that can be found in Kaithi writing, but true ligatures are not used in the modern Kaithi script.

- 𑂧୍ (m) + 𑂩 (ra) gives the ligature mra:

- 𑂩୍ (r) + 𑂧 (ma) gives the ligature rma:

== Tirhuta Ma ==
Tirhuta consonant Ma

Ma (𑒧) is a consonant of the Tirhuta abugida. It ultimately arose from the Brahmi letter, via the Siddhaṃ letter Ma. Like in other Indic scripts, Tirhuta consonants have the inherent vowel "a", and take one of several modifying vowel signs to represent sylables with another vowel or no vowel at all.

Tirhuta Ma with vowel matras
Ma	Mā	Mi	Mī	Mu	Mū	Mṛ	Mṝ	Mḷ	Mḹ	Mē	Me	Mai	Mō	Mo	Mau	M
𑒧	𑒧𑒰	𑒧𑒱	𑒧𑒲	𑒧𑒳	𑒧𑒴	𑒧𑒵	𑒧𑒶	𑒧𑒷	𑒧𑒸	𑒧𑒹	𑒧𑒺	𑒧𑒻	𑒧𑒼	𑒧𑒽	𑒧𑒾	𑒧𑓂

=== Conjuncts of 𑒧 ===
As is common in Indic scripts, Tirhuta joins letters together to form conjunct consonant clusters. The most common conjunct formation is achieved by using an explicit virama. As is common in most Indic scripts, conjuncts of ra are indicated with a repha or rakar mark attached to the rest of the consonant cluster. In addition, other consonants take unique combining forms when in conjunct with other letters, and there are several vertical conjuncts and true ligatures that can be found in Tirhuta writing.

- 𑒯୍ (h) + 𑒧 (ma) gives the ligature hma:

- 𑒧୍ (m) + 𑒥 (ba) gives the ligature mba:

- 𑒧୍ (m) + 𑒩 (ra) gives the ligature mra:

- 𑒧 (m) + 𑒅 (u) gives the ligature mu:

- 𑒧୍ (m) + 𑒫 (va) gives the ligature mva:

- 𑒩୍ (r) + 𑒧 (ma) gives the ligature rma:

- 𑒞୍ (t) + 𑒧 (ma) gives the ligature tma:

== Comparison of Ma ==
The various Indic scripts are generally related to each other through adaptation and borrowing, and as such the glyphs for cognate letters, including Ma, are related as well.

Comparison of Ma in different scripts

Aramaic
Kharoṣṭhī 𐨨	Ashoka Brahmi	Kushana Brahmi (Note: The middle "Kushana" form of Brahmi is a later style that emerged as Brahmi scripts were beginning to proliferate. Gupta Brahmi was definitely a stylistic descendant from Kushana, but other Brahmi-derived scripts may have descended from earlier forms.)	Tocharian (Note: Tocharian is probably derived from the middle period "Kushana" form of Brahmi, although artifacts from that time are not plentiful enough to establish a definite succession.) /
Gupta Brahmi	Pallava
Kadamba -
Bhaiksuki 𑰦	Siddhaṃ	Grantha 𑌮	Cham ꨟ
Sinhala ම	Pyu / Old Mon (Note: Pyu and Old Mon are probably the precursors of the Burmese script, and may be derived from either the Pallava or Kadamba script) -
Tibetan	Newa 𑐩	Ahom 𑜉	Malayalam മ
Telugu మ	Burmese မ
Lepcha ᰕ	Ranjana	Saurashtra ꢪ	Dives Akuru 𑤤
Kannada ಮ	Kayah Li ꤗ
Limbu ᤔ	Soyombo (Note: May also be derived from Devangari (see bottom left of table)) 𑩴	Khmer ម	Tamil
Chakma 𑄟	Tai Tham ᨾ
Meitei Mayek ꯃ	Gaudi -	Thai ม	Lao ມ / ໝ
Tai Le ᥛ
Marchen 𑲁	Tirhuta 𑒧	New Tai Lue ᦙ / ᦖ	Tai Viet ꪣ / ꪢ	Aksara Kawi
'Phags-pa ꡏ	Odia ମ	Sharada 𑆩	Rejang ꤸ	Batak ᯔ	Buginese ᨆ
Zanabazar Square 𑨢	Bengali-Assamese	Takri 𑚢	Javanese ꦩ	Balinese ᬫ	Makasar 𑻥
Hangul (Note: The Origin of Hangul from 'Phags-pa is one of limited influence, inspiring at most a few basic letter shapes. Hangul does not function as an Indic abugida.) -	Northern Nagari -	Dogri 𑠢	Laṇḍā -	Sundanese ᮙ	Baybayin ᜋ
Modi 𑘦	Gujarati મ	Khojki 𑈤	Khudabadi 𑋗	Mahajani 𑅬	Tagbanwa ᝫ
Devanagari	Nandinagari 𑧆	Kaithi	Gurmukhi ਮ	Multani 𑊠	Buhid ᝋ
Canadian Syllabics (Note: Although the basic letter forms of the Canadian Aboriginal Syllabics were derived from handwritten Devanagari letters, this abugida indicates vowel sounds by rotations of the letter form, rather than the use of vowel diacritics as is standard in Indic abugidas.) ᒣ	Soyombo (Note: May also be derived from Ranjana (see above)) 𑩴	Sylheti Nagari ꠝ	Gunjala Gondi 𑵰	Masaram Gondi (Note: Masaram Gondi acts as an Indic abugida, but its letterforms were not derived from any single precursor script.) 𑴤	Hanuno'o ᜫ

== Character encodings of Ma ==
Most Indic scripts are encoded in the Unicode Standard, and as such the letter Ma in those scripts can be represented in plain text with unique codepoint. Ma from several modern-use scripts can also be found in legacy encodings, such as ISCII.

Character information
Preview							మ		ମ		ಮ		മ		મ		ਮ	
Unicode name	DEVANAGARI LETTER MA		BENGALI LETTER MA		TAMIL LETTER MA		TELUGU LETTER MA		ORIYA LETTER MA		KANNADA LETTER MA		MALAYALAM LETTER MA		GUJARATI LETTER MA		GURMUKHI LETTER MA	
Encodings	decimal	hex	dec	hex	dec	hex	dec	hex	dec	hex	dec	hex	dec	hex	dec	hex	dec	hex
Unicode	2350	U+092E	2478	U+09AE	2990	U+0BAE	3118	U+0C2E	2862	U+0B2E	3246	U+0CAE	3374	U+0D2E	2734	U+0AAE	2606	U+0A2E
UTF-8	224 164 174	E0 A4 AE	224 166 174	E0 A6 AE	224 174 174	E0 AE AE	224 176 174	E0 B0 AE	224 172 174	E0 AC AE	224 178 174	E0 B2 AE	224 180 174	E0 B4 AE	224 170 174	E0 AA AE	224 168 174	E0 A8 AE
Numeric character reference	&#2350;	&#x92E;	&#2478;	&#x9AE;	&#2990;	&#xBAE;	&#3118;	&#xC2E;	&#2862;	&#xB2E;	&#3246;	&#xCAE;	&#3374;	&#xD2E;	&#2734;	&#xAAE;	&#2606;	&#xA2E;
ISCII	204	CC	204	CC	204	CC	204	CC	204	CC	204	CC	204	CC	204	CC	204	CC

Character information
Preview	Ashoka Kushana Gupta		𐨨				𑌮	
Unicode name	BRAHMI LETTER MA		KHAROSHTHI LETTER MA		SIDDHAM LETTER MA		GRANTHA LETTER MA	
Encodings	decimal	hex	dec	hex	dec	hex	dec	hex
Unicode	69675	U+1102B	68136	U+10A28	71078	U+115A6	70446	U+1132E
UTF-8	240 145 128 171	F0 91 80 AB	240 144 168 168	F0 90 A8 A8	240 145 150 166	F0 91 96 A6	240 145 140 174	F0 91 8C AE
UTF-16	55300 56363	D804 DC2B	55298 56872	D802 DE28	55301 56742	D805 DDA6	55300 57134	D804 DF2E
Numeric character reference	&#69675;	&#x1102B;	&#68136;	&#x10A28;	&#71078;	&#x115A6;	&#70446;	&#x1132E;

Character information
Preview			ྨ		ꡏ		𑨢		𑐩		𑰦		𑆩	
Unicode name	TIBETAN LETTER MA		TIBETAN SUBJOINED LETTER MA		PHAGS-PA LETTER MA		ZANABAZAR SQUARE LETTER MA		NEWA LETTER MA		BHAIKSUKI LETTER MA		SHARADA LETTER MA	
Encodings	decimal	hex	dec	hex	dec	hex	dec	hex	dec	hex	dec	hex	dec	hex
Unicode	3928	U+0F58	4008	U+0FA8	43087	U+A84F	72226	U+11A22	70697	U+11429	72742	U+11C26	70057	U+111A9
UTF-8	224 189 152	E0 BD 98	224 190 168	E0 BE A8	234 161 143	EA A1 8F	240 145 168 162	F0 91 A8 A2	240 145 144 169	F0 91 90 A9	240 145 176 166	F0 91 B0 A6	240 145 134 169	F0 91 86 A9
UTF-16	3928	0F58	4008	0FA8	43087	A84F	55302 56866	D806 DE22	55301 56361	D805 DC29	55303 56358	D807 DC26	55300 56745	D804 DDA9
Numeric character reference	&#3928;	&#xF58;	&#4008;	&#xFA8;	&#43087;	&#xA84F;	&#72226;	&#x11A22;	&#70697;	&#x11429;	&#72742;	&#x11C26;	&#70057;	&#x111A9;

Character information
Preview	မ		ᨾ		ᩜ		ᦙ		ᦖ		ᧄ	
Unicode name	MYANMAR LETTER MA		TAI THAM LETTER MA		TAI THAM CONSONANT SIGN MA		NEW TAI LUE LETTER LOW MA		NEW TAI LUE LETTER HIGH MA		NEW TAI LUE LETTER FINAL M	
Encodings	decimal	hex	dec	hex	dec	hex	dec	hex	dec	hex	dec	hex
Unicode	4121	U+1019	6718	U+1A3E	6748	U+1A5C	6553	U+1999	6550	U+1996	6596	U+19C4
UTF-8	225 128 153	E1 80 99	225 168 190	E1 A8 BE	225 169 156	E1 A9 9C	225 166 153	E1 A6 99	225 166 150	E1 A6 96	225 167 132	E1 A7 84
Numeric character reference	&#4121;	&#x1019;	&#6718;	&#x1A3E;	&#6748;	&#x1A5C;	&#6553;	&#x1999;	&#6550;	&#x1996;	&#6596;	&#x19C4;

Character information
Preview	ម		ມ		ໝ		ม		ꪣ		ꪢ	
Unicode name	KHMER LETTER MO		LAO LETTER MO		LAO HO MO		THAI CHARACTER MO MA		TAI VIET LETTER HIGH MO		TAI VIET LETTER LOW MO	
Encodings	decimal	hex	dec	hex	dec	hex	dec	hex	dec	hex	dec	hex
Unicode	6040	U+1798	3745	U+0EA1	3805	U+0EDD	3617	U+0E21	43683	U+AAA3	43682	U+AAA2
UTF-8	225 158 152	E1 9E 98	224 186 161	E0 BA A1	224 187 157	E0 BB 9D	224 184 161	E0 B8 A1	234 170 163	EA AA A3	234 170 162	EA AA A2
Numeric character reference	&#6040;	&#x1798;	&#3745;	&#xEA1;	&#3805;	&#xEDD;	&#3617;	&#xE21;	&#43683;	&#xAAA3;	&#43682;	&#xAAA2;

Character information
Preview	ම		ꤗ		𑄟		ᥛ		𑜉		𑤤		ꢪ		ꨟ	
Unicode name	SINHALA LETTER MAYANNA		KAYAH LI LETTER MA		CHAKMA LETTER MAA		TAI LE LETTER MA		AHOM LETTER MA		DIVES AKURU LETTER MA		SAURASHTRA LETTER MA		CHAM LETTER MUE	
Encodings	decimal	hex	dec	hex	dec	hex	dec	hex	dec	hex	dec	hex	dec	hex	dec	hex
Unicode	3512	U+0DB8	43287	U+A917	69919	U+1111F	6491	U+195B	71433	U+11709	71972	U+11924	43178	U+A8AA	43551	U+AA1F
UTF-8	224 182 184	E0 B6 B8	234 164 151	EA A4 97	240 145 132 159	F0 91 84 9F	225 165 155	E1 A5 9B	240 145 156 137	F0 91 9C 89	240 145 164 164	F0 91 A4 A4	234 162 170	EA A2 AA	234 168 159	EA A8 9F
UTF-16	3512	0DB8	43287	A917	55300 56607	D804 DD1F	6491	195B	55301 57097	D805 DF09	55302 56612	D806 DD24	43178	A8AA	43551	AA1F
Numeric character reference	&#3512;	&#xDB8;	&#43287;	&#xA917;	&#69919;	&#x1111F;	&#6491;	&#x195B;	&#71433;	&#x11709;	&#71972;	&#x11924;	&#43178;	&#xA8AA;	&#43551;	&#xAA1F;

Character information
Preview	𑘦		𑧆		𑩴		ꠝ		𑵰			
Unicode name	MODI LETTER MA		NANDINAGARI LETTER MA		SOYOMBO LETTER MA		SYLOTI NAGRI LETTER MO		GUNJALA GONDI LETTER MA		KAITHI LETTER MA	
Encodings	decimal	hex	dec	hex	dec	hex	dec	hex	dec	hex	dec	hex
Unicode	71206	U+11626	72134	U+119C6	72308	U+11A74	43037	U+A81D	73072	U+11D70	69799	U+110A7
UTF-8	240 145 152 166	F0 91 98 A6	240 145 167 134	F0 91 A7 86	240 145 169 180	F0 91 A9 B4	234 160 157	EA A0 9D	240 145 181 176	F0 91 B5 B0	240 145 130 167	F0 91 82 A7
UTF-16	55301 56870	D805 DE26	55302 56774	D806 DDC6	55302 56948	D806 DE74	43037	A81D	55303 56688	D807 DD70	55300 56487	D804 DCA7
Numeric character reference	&#71206;	&#x11626;	&#72134;	&#x119C6;	&#72308;	&#x11A74;	&#43037;	&#xA81D;	&#73072;	&#x11D70;	&#69799;	&#x110A7;

Character information
Preview	𑒧		ᰕ		ᤔ		ꯃ		𑲁	
Unicode name	TIRHUTA LETTER MA		LEPCHA LETTER MA		LIMBU LETTER MA		MEETEI MAYEK LETTER MIT		MARCHEN LETTER MA	
Encodings	decimal	hex	dec	hex	dec	hex	dec	hex	dec	hex
Unicode	70823	U+114A7	7189	U+1C15	6420	U+1914	43971	U+ABC3	72833	U+11C81
UTF-8	240 145 146 167	F0 91 92 A7	225 176 149	E1 B0 95	225 164 148	E1 A4 94	234 175 131	EA AF 83	240 145 178 129	F0 91 B2 81
UTF-16	55301 56487	D805 DCA7	7189	1C15	6420	1914	43971	ABC3	55303 56449	D807 DC81
Numeric character reference	&#70823;	&#x114A7;	&#7189;	&#x1C15;	&#6420;	&#x1914;	&#43971;	&#xABC3;	&#72833;	&#x11C81;

Character information
Preview	𑚢		𑠢		𑈤		𑋗		𑅬		𑊠	
Unicode name	TAKRI LETTER MA		DOGRA LETTER MA		KHOJKI LETTER MA		KHUDAWADI LETTER MA		MAHAJANI LETTER MA		MULTANI LETTER MA	
Encodings	decimal	hex	dec	hex	dec	hex	dec	hex	dec	hex	dec	hex
Unicode	71330	U+116A2	71714	U+11822	70180	U+11224	70359	U+112D7	69996	U+1116C	70304	U+112A0
UTF-8	240 145 154 162	F0 91 9A A2	240 145 160 162	F0 91 A0 A2	240 145 136 164	F0 91 88 A4	240 145 139 151	F0 91 8B 97	240 145 133 172	F0 91 85 AC	240 145 138 160	F0 91 8A A0
UTF-16	55301 56994	D805 DEA2	55302 56354	D806 DC22	55300 56868	D804 DE24	55300 57047	D804 DED7	55300 56684	D804 DD6C	55300 56992	D804 DEA0
Numeric character reference	&#71330;	&#x116A2;	&#71714;	&#x11822;	&#70180;	&#x11224;	&#70359;	&#x112D7;	&#69996;	&#x1116C;	&#70304;	&#x112A0;

Character information
Preview	ᬫ		ᯔ		ᨆ		ꦩ		𑻥		ꤸ		ᮙ	
Unicode name	BALINESE LETTER MA		BATAK LETTER MA		BUGINESE LETTER MA		JAVANESE LETTER MA		MAKASAR LETTER MA		REJANG LETTER MA		SUNDANESE LETTER MA	
Encodings	decimal	hex	dec	hex	dec	hex	dec	hex	dec	hex	dec	hex	dec	hex
Unicode	6955	U+1B2B	7124	U+1BD4	6662	U+1A06	43433	U+A9A9	73445	U+11EE5	43320	U+A938	7065	U+1B99
UTF-8	225 172 171	E1 AC AB	225 175 148	E1 AF 94	225 168 134	E1 A8 86	234 166 169	EA A6 A9	240 145 187 165	F0 91 BB A5	234 164 184	EA A4 B8	225 174 153	E1 AE 99
UTF-16	6955	1B2B	7124	1BD4	6662	1A06	43433	A9A9	55303 57061	D807 DEE5	43320	A938	7065	1B99
Numeric character reference	&#6955;	&#x1B2B;	&#7124;	&#x1BD4;	&#6662;	&#x1A06;	&#43433;	&#xA9A9;	&#73445;	&#x11EE5;	&#43320;	&#xA938;	&#7065;	&#x1B99;

Character information
Preview	ᜋ		ᝫ		ᝋ		ᜫ		𑴤	
Unicode name	TAGALOG LETTER MA		TAGBANWA LETTER MA		BUHID LETTER MA		HANUNOO LETTER MA		MASARAM GONDI LETTER MA	
Encodings	decimal	hex	dec	hex	dec	hex	dec	hex	dec	hex
Unicode	5899	U+170B	5995	U+176B	5963	U+174B	5931	U+172B	72996	U+11D24
UTF-8	225 156 139	E1 9C 8B	225 157 171	E1 9D AB	225 157 139	E1 9D 8B	225 156 171	E1 9C AB	240 145 180 164	F0 91 B4 A4
UTF-16	5899	170B	5995	176B	5963	174B	5931	172B	55303 56612	D807 DD24
Numeric character reference	&#5899;	&#x170B;	&#5995;	&#x176B;	&#5963;	&#x174B;	&#5931;	&#x172B;	&#72996;	&#x11D24;

Character information
Preview	ᒣ		ᒥ		ᒧ		ᒪ		ᒻ	
Unicode name	CANADIAN SYLLABICS ME		CANADIAN SYLLABICS MI		CANADIAN SYLLABICS MO		CANADIAN SYLLABICS MA		CANADIAN SYLLABICS M	
Encodings	decimal	hex	dec	hex	dec	hex	dec	hex	dec	hex
Unicode	5283	U+14A3	5285	U+14A5	5287	U+14A7	5290	U+14AA	5307	U+14BB
UTF-8	225 146 163	E1 92 A3	225 146 165	E1 92 A5	225 146 167	E1 92 A7	225 146 170	E1 92 AA	225 146 187	E1 92 BB
Numeric character reference	&#5283;	&#x14A3;	&#5285;	&#x14A5;	&#5287;	&#x14A7;	&#5290;	&#x14AA;	&#5307;	&#x14BB;

- The full range of E Canadian syllabic characters can be found at the codepoint ranges .
