= Ṇa =

Letter "Ṇa" in Indic scripts

Example glyphs
- Bengali–Assamese: Ṇa
- Tibetan: ཎ
- Tamil: Ṇa
- Thai: ณ
- Malayalam: ണ
- Sinhala: ණ
- Ashoka Brahmi: Ṇa
- Devanagari: Ṇa

Cognates
- Hebrew: נ ,ן
- Greek: Ν
- Latin: N
- Cyrillic: Н

Properties
- Phonemic representation: /ɳ/ /n/^{B}
- IAST transliteration: ṇ Ṇ
- ISCII code point: C1 (193)
- ^B in Tai languages, Burmese, Mon and Khmer

Ṇa (also romanized as Nna) is a consonant of Indic abugidas. In modern Indic scripts, Ṇa is derived from the early "Ashoka" Brahmi letter after having gone through the Gupta letter. As with the other cerebral consonants, ṇa is not found in most scripts for Tai, Sino-Tibetan, and other non-Indic languages, except for a few scripts, which retain these letters for transcribing Sanskrit religious terms.

== Āryabhaṭa numeration ==
Aryabhata used Devanagari letters for numbers, very similar to the Greek numerals, even after the invention of Indian numerals. The values of the different forms of ण are:

- ण [ɳə] = 15 (१५)
- णि [ɳɪ] = 1,500 (१ ५००)
- णु [ɳʊ] = 150,000 (१ ५० ०००)
- णृ [ɳri] = 15,000,000 (१ ५० ०० ०००)
- णॢ [ɳlə] = 1,500,000,000 (१ ५० ०० ०० ०००)
- णे [ɳe] = 15×10^{10} (१५×१०^{१०})
- णै [ɳɛː] = 15×10^{12} (१५×१०^{१२})
- णो [ɳoː] = 15×10^{14} (१५×१०^{१४})
- णौ [ɳɔː] = 15×10^{16} (१५×१०^{१६})

== Historic Ṇa ==
There are three different general early historic scripts - Brahmi and its variants, Kharoṣṭhī, and Tocharian, the so-called slanting Brahmi. Ṇa as found in standard Brahmi, was a simple geometric shape, with variations toward more flowing forms by the Gupta. The Tocharian Ṇa did not have an alternate Fremdzeichen form. The third form of ṇa, in Kharoshthi was probably derived from Aramaic separately from the Brahmi letter.

=== Brahmi Ṇa ===
The Brahmi letter, Ṇa, is probably derived from the altered Aramaic Nun, and is thus related to the modern Latin N and Greek Nu. Several identifiable styles of writing the Brahmi Ṇa can be found, most associated with a specific set of inscriptions from an artifact or diverse records from an historic period. As the earliest and most geometric style of Brahmi, the letters found on the Edicts of Ashoka and other records from around that time are normally the reference form for Brahmi letters, with vowel marks not attested until later forms of Brahmi back-formed to match the geometric writing style.

Brahmi Ṇa historic forms
Ashoka (3rd-1st c. BCE)	Girnar (~150 BCE)	Kushana (~150-250 CE)	Gujarat (~250 CE)	Gupta (~350 CE)

=== Tocharian Ṇa ===
The Tocharian letter is derived from the Brahmi, but does not have an alternate Fremdzeichen form.

Tocharian Ṇa with vowel marks
Ṇa	Ṇā	Ṇi	Ṇī	Ṇu	Ṇū	Ṇr	Ṇr̄	Ṇe	Ṇai	Ṇo	Ṇau	Ṇä

=== Kharoṣṭhī Ṇa ===
The Kharoṣṭhī letter is generally accepted as being derived from the altered Aramaic Nun, and is thus related to N and Nu, in addition to the Brahmi Ṇa.

== Devanagari Ṇa ==
regular Devanagari Ṇa

Uttara Devanagari Ṇa

Ṇa (ण) is a consonant of the Devanagari abugida. It ultimately arose from the Brahmi letter, after having gone through the Gupta letter. Letters that derive from it are the Gujarati letter ણ, and the Modi letter 𑘜. Ṇa is one of several letters with an alternate form when written in the Uttara (northern) style of Devanagari.

=== Devanagari-using Languages ===
In all languages, ण is pronounced as [ɳə] or [ɳ] when appropriate. Like all Indic scripts, Devanagari uses vowel marks attached to the base consonant to override the inherent /ə/ vowel:

Devanagari ण with vowel marks
Ṇa	Ṇā	Ṇi	Ṇī	Ṇu	Ṇū	Ṇr	Ṇr̄	Ṇl	Ṇl̄	Ṇe	Ṇai	Ṇo	Ṇau	Ṇ
ण	णा	णि	णी	णु	णू	णृ	णॄ	णॢ	णॣ	णे	णै	णो	णौ	ण्

=== Conjuncts with ण ===
Half form of Ṇa.

Devanagari exhibits conjunct ligatures, as is common in Indic scripts. In modern Devanagari texts, most conjuncts are formed by reducing the letter shape to fit tightly to the following letter, usually by dropping a character's vertical stem, sometimes referred to as a "half form". Some conjunct clusters are always represented by a true ligature, instead of a shape that can be broken into constituent independent letters. Vertically stacked conjuncts are ubiquitous in older texts, while only a few are still used routinely in modern Devanagari texts. The use of ligatures and vertical conjuncts may vary across languages using the Devanagari script, with Marathi in particular preferring the use of half forms where texts in other languages would show ligatures and vertical stacks.

==== Ligature conjuncts of ण ====
True ligatures are quite rare in Indic scripts. The most common ligated conjuncts in Devanagari are in the form of a slight mutation to fit in context or as a consistent variant form appended to the adjacent characters. Those variants include Na and the Repha and Rakar forms of Ra. Nepali and Marathi texts use the "eyelash" Ra half form for an initial "R" instead of repha.

- Repha र্ (r) + ण (ṇa) gives the ligature rṇa: ^{note}

- Eyelash र্ (r) + ण (ṇa) gives the ligature rṇa:

- ण্ (ṇ) + rakar र (ra) gives the ligature ṇra:

- ण্ (ṇ) + न (na) gives the ligature ṇna:

==== Stacked conjuncts of ण ====
Vertically stacked ligatures are the most common conjunct forms found in Devanagari text. Although the constituent characters may need to be stretched and moved slightly in order to stack neatly, stacked conjuncts can be broken down into recognizable base letters, or a letter and an otherwise standard ligature.

- छ্ (cʰ) + ण (ṇa) gives the ligature cʰṇa:

- ढ্ (ḍʱ) + ण (ṇa) gives the ligature ḍʱṇa:

- ड্ (ḍ) + ण (ṇa) gives the ligature ḍṇa:

- द্ (d) + ण (ṇa) gives the ligature dṇa:

- ह্ (h) + ण (ṇa) gives the ligature hṇa:

- ख্ (kʰ) + ण (ṇa) gives the ligature kʰṇa:

- ङ্ (ŋ) + ण (ṇa) gives the ligature ŋṇa:

- ण্ (ṇ) + ल (la) gives the ligature ṇla:

- प্ (p) + ण (ṇa) gives the ligature pṇa:

- ठ্ (ṭʰ) + ण (ṇa) gives the ligature ṭʰṇa:

- ट্ (ṭ) + ण (ṇa) gives the ligature ṭṇa:

== Bengali Ṇa ==
The Bengali script ণ is derived from the Siddhaṃ, and is marked by a reduced head line, and less geometric shape than its Devanagari counterpart, ण. The inherent vowel of Bengali consonant letters is /ɔ/, so the bare letter ণ will sometimes be transliterated as "ṇo" instead of "ṇa". Adding okar, the "o" vowel mark, gives a reading of /n̳o/. Like all Indic consonants, ণ can be modified by marks to indicate another (or no) vowel than its inherent "a".

Bengali ণ with vowel marks
ṇa	ṇā	ṇi	ṇī	ṇu	ṇū	ṇr	ṇr̄	ṇe	ṇai	ṇo	ṇau	ṇ
ণ	ণা	ণি	ণী	ণু	ণূ	ণৃ	ণৄ	ণে	ণৈ	ণো	ণৌ	ণ্

=== ণ in Bengali-using languages ===
ণ is used as a basic consonant character in all of the major Bengali script orthographies, including Bengali and Assamese.

=== Conjuncts with ণ ===
Bengali ণ exhibits conjunct ligatures, as is common in Indic scripts, in the form of both stacked and linear (horizontal) ligatures.

- গ্ (g) + ণ (ṇa) gives the ligature gṇa:

- ণ্ (ṇ) + ড (ḍa) gives the ligature ṇḍa:

- ণ্ (ṇ) + ঢ (ḍʱa) gives the ligature ṇḍʱa:

- ণ্ (ṇ) + ড্ (ḍ) + র (ra) gives the ligature ṇḍra, with the ra phala suffix:

- ণ্ (ṇ) + ড্ (ḍ) + য (ya) gives the ligature ṇḍya, with the ya phala suffix:

- ণ্ (ṇ) + ম (ma) gives the ligature ṇma:

- ণ্ (ṇ) + ণ (ṇa) gives the ligature ṇṇa:

- ণ্ (ṇ) + ট (ṭa) gives the ligature ṇṭa:

- ণ্ (ṇ) + ঠ (ṭʰa) gives the ligature ṇṭʰa:

- ণ্ (ṇ) + ঠ্ (ṭʰ) + য (ya) gives the ligature ṇṭʰya, with the ya phala suffix:

- ণ্ (ṇ) + য (ya) gives the ligature ṇya, with the ya phala suffix:

- র্ (r) + ণ (ṇa) gives the ligature rṇa, with the repha prefix:

- র্ (r) + ণ্ (ṇ) + য (ya) gives the ligature rṇya, with the repha prefix and ya phala suffix:

== Gujarati Ṇa ==
Gujarati Ṇa.

Ṇa (ણ) is the fifteenth consonant of the Gujarati abugida. It is derived from the Devanagari Ṇa with the top bar (shiro rekha) removed, and ultimately the Brahmi letter.

=== Gujarati-using Languages ===
The Gujarati script is used to write the Gujarati and Kutchi languages. In both languages, ણ is pronounced as [ɳə] or [ɳ] when appropriate. Like all Indic scripts, Gujarati uses vowel marks attached to the base consonant to override the inherent /ə/ vowel:

Ṇa	Ṇā	Ṇi	Ṇī	Ṇu	Ṇū	Ṇr	Ṇl	Ṇr̄	Ṇl̄	Ṇĕ	Ṇe	Ṇai	Ṇŏ	Ṇo	Ṇau	Ṇ
Gujarati Ṇa syllables, with vowel marks in red.

=== Conjuncts with ણ ===
Half form of Ṇa.

Gujarati ણ exhibits conjunct ligatures, much like its parent Devanagari Script. Most Gujarati conjuncts can only be formed by reducing the letter shape to fit tightly to the following letter, usually by dropping a character's vertical stem, sometimes referred to as a "half form". A few conjunct clusters can be represented by a true ligature, instead of a shape that can be broken into constituent independent letters, and vertically stacked conjuncts can also be found in Gujarati, although much less commonly than in Devanagari. True ligatures are quite rare in Indic scripts. The most common ligated conjuncts in Gujarati are in the form of a slight mutation to fit in context or as a consistent variant form appended to the adjacent characters. Those variants include Na and the Repha and Rakar forms of Ra.

- ર્ (r) + ણ (ɳa) gives the ligature RṆa:

- ણ્ (ɳ) + ર (ra) gives the ligature ṆRa:

- હ્ (h) + ણ (ɳa) gives the ligature HṆa:

*Note that the ligature for Gujarati HṆa contains the half form of Devanagari Ṇa instead of a form of Gujarati Ṇa.

== Telugu Ṇa ==
Telugu independent and subjoined Ṇa.

Ṇa (ణ) is a consonant of the Telugu abugida. It ultimately arose from the Brahmi letter. It is closely related to the Kannada letter ಣ. Since it lacks the v-shaped headstroke common to most Telugu letters, ణ remains unaltered by most vowel matras, and its subjoined form is simply a smaller version of the normal letter shape. Telugu conjuncts are created by reducing trailing letters to a subjoined form that appears below the initial consonant of the conjunct. Many subjoined forms are created by dropping their headline, with many extending the end of the stroke of the main letter body to form an extended tail reaching up to the right of the preceding consonant. This subjoining of trailing letters to create conjuncts is in contrast to the leading half forms of Devanagari and Bengali letters. Ligature conjuncts are not a feature in Telugu, with the only non-standard construction being an alternate subjoined form of Ṣa (borrowed from Kannada) in the KṢa conjunct.

== Malayalam Ṇa ==
Malayalam letter Ṇa

Ṇa (ണ) is a consonant of the Malayalam abugida. It ultimately arose from the Brahmi letter, via the Grantha letter Ṇa. Like in other Indic scripts, Malayalam consonants have the inherent vowel "a", and take one of several modifying vowel signs to represent syllables with another vowel or no vowel at all.

Malayalam Ṇa matras: Ṇa, Ṇā, Ṇi, Ṇī, Ṇu, Ṇū, Ṇr̥, Ṇr̥̄, Ṇl̥, Ṇl̥̄, Ṇe, Ṇē, Ṇai, Ṇo, Ṇō, Ṇau, and Ṇ.

=== Conjuncts of ണ ===
Malayalam letter Chillu Ṇ

As is common in Indic scripts, Malayalam joins letters together to form conjunct consonant clusters. There are several ways in which conjuncts are formed in Malayalam texts: using a post-base form of a trailing consonant placed under the initial consonant of a conjunct, a combined ligature of two or more consonants joined together, a conjoining form that appears as a combining mark on the rest of the conjunct, the use of an explicit candrakkala mark to suppress the inherent "a" vowel, or a special consonant form called a "chillu" letter, representing a bare consonant without the inherent "a" vowel. Texts written with the modern reformed Malayalam orthography, put̪iya lipi, may favor more regular conjunct forms than older texts in paḻaya lipi, due to changes undertaken in the 1970s by the Government of Kerala.

- ണ് (ṇ) + ട (ṭa) gives the ligature ṇṭa:

- ണ് (ṇ) + ഠ (ṭʰa) gives the ligature ṇṭʰa:

- ണ് (ṇ) + ഡ (ḍa) gives the ligature ṇḍa:

- ണ് (ṇ) + ഢ (ḍʱa) gives the ligature ṇḍʱa:

- ക് (k) + ണ (ṇa) gives the ligature kṇa:

- ണ് (ṇ) + ണ (ṇa) gives the ligature ṇṇa:

- ഷ് (ṣ) + ണ (ṇa) gives the ligature ṣṇa:

- ണ് (ṇ) + മ (ma) gives the ligature ṇma:

- ക് (k) + ഷ് (ṣ) + ണ (ṇa) gives the ligature kṣṇa:

== Odia Ṇa ==
Odia independent and subjoined letter Ṇa.

Ṇa (ଣ) is a consonant of the Odia abugida. It ultimately arose from the Brahmi letter, via the Siddhaṃ letter Ṇa. Like in other Indic scripts, Odia consonants have the inherent vowel "a", and take one of several modifying vowel signs to represent syllables with another vowel or no vowel at all.

Odia Ṇa with vowel matras
Ṇa	Ṇā	Ṇi	Ṇī	Ṇu	Ṇū	Ṇr̥	Ṇr̥̄	Ṇl̥	Ṇl̥̄	Ṇe	Ṇai	Ṇo	Ṇau	Ṇ
ଣ	ଣା	ଣି	ଣୀ	ଣୁ	ଣୂ	ଣୃ	ଣୄ	ଣୢ	ଣୣ	ଣେ	ଣୈ	ଣୋ	ଣୌ	ଣ୍

=== Conjuncts of ଣ ===
As is common in Indic scripts, Odia joins letters together to form conjunct consonant clusters. The most common conjunct formation is achieved by using a small subjoined form of trailing consonants. Most consonants' subjoined forms are identical to the full form, just reduced in size, although a few drop the curved headline or have a subjoined form not directly related to the full form of the consonant. The second type of conjunct formation is through pure ligatures, where the constituent consonants are written together in a single graphic form. This ligature may be recognizable as being a combination of two characters or it can have a conjunct ligature unrelated to its constituent characters.

- ଣ୍ (ṇ) + ଡ (ḍa) gives the ligature ṇḍa:

- ଣ୍ (ṇ) + ଣ (ṇa) gives the ligature ṇṇa:

== Kaithi Ṇa ==
Kaithi consonant and half-form Ṇa.

Ṇa (𑂝) is a consonant of the Kaithi abugida. It ultimately arose from the Brahmi letter, via the Siddhaṃ letter Ṇa. Like in other Indic scripts, Kaithi consonants have the inherent vowel "a", and take one of several modifying vowel signs to represent syllables with another vowel or no vowel at all.

Kaithi Ṇa with vowel matras
Ṇa	Ṇā	Ṇi	Ṇī	Ṇu	Ṇū	Ṇe	Ṇai	Ṇo	Ṇau	Ṇ
𑂝	𑂝𑂰	𑂝𑂱	𑂝𑂲	𑂝𑂳	𑂝𑂴	𑂝𑂵	𑂝𑂶	𑂝𑂷	𑂝𑂸	𑂝𑂹

=== Conjuncts of 𑂝 ===
As is common in Indic scripts, Kaithi joins letters together to form conjunct consonant clusters. The most common conjunct formation is achieved by using a half form of preceding consonants, although several consonants use an explicit virama. Most half forms are derived from the full form by removing the vertical stem. As is common in most Indic scripts, conjuncts of ra are indicated with a repha or rakar mark attached to the rest of the consonant cluster. In addition, there are a few vertical conjuncts that can be found in Kaithi writing, but true ligatures are not used in the modern Kaithi script.

- 𑂩୍ (r) + 𑂝 (ṇa) gives the ligature rṇa:

== Tirhuta Ṇa ==
Tirhuta consonant Ṇa

Ṇa (𑒝) is a consonant of the Tirhuta abugida. It ultimately arose from the Brahmi letter, via the Siddhaṃ letter Nna. Like in other Indic scripts, Tirhuta consonants have the inherent vowel "a", and take one of several modifying vowel signs to represent sylables with another vowel or no vowel at all.

Tirhuta Ṇa with vowel matras
Ṇa	Ṇā	Ṇi	Ṇī	Ṇu	Ṇū	Ṇṛ	Ṇṝ	Ṇḷ	Ṇḹ	Ṇē	Ṇe	Ṇai	Ṇō	Ṇo	Ṇau	Ṇ
𑒝	𑒝𑒰	𑒝𑒱	𑒝𑒲	𑒝𑒳	𑒝𑒴	𑒝𑒵	𑒝𑒶	𑒝𑒷	𑒝𑒸	𑒝𑒹	𑒝𑒺	𑒝𑒻	𑒝𑒼	𑒝𑒽	𑒝𑒾	𑒝𑓂

=== Conjuncts of 𑒝 ===
As is common in Indic scripts, Tirhuta joins letters together to form conjunct consonant clusters. The most common conjunct formation is achieved by using an explicit virama. As is common in most Indic scripts, conjuncts of ra are indicated with a repha or rakar mark attached to the rest of the consonant cluster. In addition, other consonants take unique combining forms when in conjunct with other letters, and there are several vertical conjuncts and true ligatures that can be found in Tirhuta writing.

- 𑒯୍ (h) + 𑒝 (ṇa) gives the ligature hṇa:

- 𑒝୍ (ṇ) + 𑒛 (ḍa) gives the ligature ṇḍa:

- 𑒝୍ (ṇ) + 𑒝 (ṇa) gives the ligature ṇṇa:

- 𑒝୍ (ṇ) + 𑒩 (ra) gives the ligature ṇra:

- 𑒝୍ (ṇ) + 𑒙 (ṭa) gives the ligature ṇṭa:

- 𑒝୍ (ṇ) + 𑒚 (ṭʰa) gives the ligature ṇṭʰa:

- 𑒝 (ṇ) + 𑒅 (u) gives the ligature ṇu:

- 𑒝୍ (ṇ) + 𑒫 (va) gives the ligature ṇva:

- 𑒩୍ (r) + 𑒝 (ṇa) gives the ligature rṇa:

- 𑒭୍ (ṣ) + 𑒝 (ṇa) gives the ligature ṣṇa:

- 𑒞୍ (t) + 𑒝 (ṇa) gives the ligature tṇa:

== Comparison of Ṇa ==
The various Indic scripts are generally related to each other through adaptation and borrowing, and as such the glyphs for cognate letters, including Ṇa, are related as well.

Comparison of Ṇa in different scripts

Aramaic
Kharoṣṭhī 𐨞	Ashoka Brahmi	Kushana Brahmi (Note: The middle "Kushana" form of Brahmi is a later style that emerged as Brahmi scripts were beginning to proliferate. Gupta Brahmi was definitely a stylistic descendant from Kushana, but other Brahmi-derived scripts may have descended from earlier forms.)	Tocharian (Note: Tocharian is probably derived from the middle period "Kushana" form of Brahmi, although artifacts from that time are not plentiful enough to establish a definite succession.)
Gupta Brahmi	Pallava
Kadamba -
Bhaiksuki 𑰜	Siddhaṃ	Grantha 𑌣	Cham -
Sinhala ණ	Pyu / Old Mon (Note: Pyu and Old Mon are probably the precursors of the Burmese script, and may be derived from either the Pallava or Kadamba script) -
Tibetan ཎ	Newa 𑐞	Ahom -	Malayalam ണ
Telugu ణ	Burmese ဏ
Lepcha -	Ranjana	Saurashtra ꢠ	Dives Akuru 𑤚
Kannada ಣ	Kayah Li -
Limbu -	Soyombo (Note: May also be derived from Devangari (see bottom left of table)) 𑩪	Khmer ណ	Tamil
Chakma 𑄕	Tai Tham ᨱ
Meitei Mayek -	Gaudi -	Thai ณ	Lao ຓ
Tai Le -
Marchen 𑱾	Tirhuta 𑒝	New Tai Lue -	Tai Viet -	Aksara Kawi
'Phags-pa ꡬ	Odia ଣ	Sharada 𑆟	Rejang -	Batak -	Buginese -
Zanabazar Square 𑨘	Bengali–Assamese	Takri 𑚘	Javanese ꦟ	Balinese ᬡ	Makasar -
Hangul (Note: The Origin of Hangul from 'Phags-pa is one of limited influence, inspiring at most a few basic letter shapes. Hangul does not function as an Indic abugida.) -	Northern Nagari -	Dogri 𑠘	Laṇḍā -	Sundanese -	Baybayin -
Modi 𑘜	Gujarati ણ	Khojki 𑈘	Khudabadi 𑋌	Mahajani 𑅢	Tagbanwa -
Devanagari	Nandinagari 𑦼	Kaithi	Gurmukhi ਣ	Multani 𑊔	Buhid -
Canadian Syllabics (Note: Although the basic letter forms of the Canadian Aboriginal Syllabics were derived from handwritten Devanagari letters, this abugida indicates vowel sounds by rotations of the letter form, rather than the use of vowel diacritics as is standard in Indic abugidas.) -	Soyombo (Note: May also be derived from Ranjana (see above)) 𑩪	Sylheti Nagari -	Gunjala Gondi -	Masaram Gondi (Note: Masaram Gondi acts as an Indic abugida, but its letterforms were not derived from any single precursor script.) 𑴚	Hanuno'o -

== Character encodings of Ṇa ==
Most Indic scripts are encoded in the Unicode Standard, and as such the letter Ṇa in those scripts can be represented in plain text with unique codepoint. Ṇa from several modern-use scripts can also be found in legacy encodings, such as ISCII.

Character information
Preview							ణ		ଣ		ಣ		ണ		ણ		ਣ	
Unicode name	DEVANAGARI LETTER NNA		BENGALI LETTER NNA		TAMIL LETTER NNA		TELUGU LETTER NNA		ORIYA LETTER NNA		KANNADA LETTER NNA		MALAYALAM LETTER NNA		GUJARATI LETTER NNA		GURMUKHI LETTER NNA	
Encodings	decimal	hex	dec	hex	dec	hex	dec	hex	dec	hex	dec	hex	dec	hex	dec	hex	dec	hex
Unicode	2339	U+0923	2467	U+09A3	2979	U+0BA3	3107	U+0C23	2851	U+0B23	3235	U+0CA3	3363	U+0D23	2723	U+0AA3	2595	U+0A23
UTF-8	224 164 163	E0 A4 A3	224 166 163	E0 A6 A3	224 174 163	E0 AE A3	224 176 163	E0 B0 A3	224 172 163	E0 AC A3	224 178 163	E0 B2 A3	224 180 163	E0 B4 A3	224 170 163	E0 AA A3	224 168 163	E0 A8 A3
Numeric character reference	&#2339;	&#x923;	&#2467;	&#x9A3;	&#2979;	&#xBA3;	&#3107;	&#xC23;	&#2851;	&#xB23;	&#3235;	&#xCA3;	&#3363;	&#xD23;	&#2723;	&#xAA3;	&#2595;	&#xA23;
ISCII	193	C1	193	C1	193	C1	193	C1	193	C1	193	C1	193	C1	193	C1	193	C1

Character information
Preview	Ashoka Kushana Gupta		𐨞				𑌣	
Unicode name	BRAHMI LETTER NNA		KHAROSHTHI LETTER NNA		SIDDHAM LETTER NNA		GRANTHA LETTER NNA	
Encodings	decimal	hex	dec	hex	dec	hex	dec	hex
Unicode	69665	U+11021	68126	U+10A1E	71068	U+1159C	70435	U+11323
UTF-8	240 145 128 161	F0 91 80 A1	240 144 168 158	F0 90 A8 9E	240 145 150 156	F0 91 96 9C	240 145 140 163	F0 91 8C A3
UTF-16	55300 56353	D804 DC21	55298 56862	D802 DE1E	55301 56732	D805 DD9C	55300 57123	D804 DF23
Numeric character reference	&#69665;	&#x11021;	&#68126;	&#x10A1E;	&#71068;	&#x1159C;	&#70435;	&#x11323;

Character information
Preview	ཎ		ྞ		ꡬ		𑨘		𑐞		𑰜		𑆟	
Unicode name	TIBETAN LETTER NNA		TIBETAN SUBJOINED LETTER NNA		PHAGS-PA LETTER NNA		ZANABAZAR SQUARE LETTER NNA		NEWA LETTER NNA		BHAIKSUKI LETTER NNA		SHARADA LETTER NNA	
Encodings	decimal	hex	dec	hex	dec	hex	dec	hex	dec	hex	dec	hex	dec	hex
Unicode	3918	U+0F4E	3998	U+0F9E	43116	U+A86C	72216	U+11A18	70686	U+1141E	72732	U+11C1C	70047	U+1119F
UTF-8	224 189 142	E0 BD 8E	224 190 158	E0 BE 9E	234 161 172	EA A1 AC	240 145 168 152	F0 91 A8 98	240 145 144 158	F0 91 90 9E	240 145 176 156	F0 91 B0 9C	240 145 134 159	F0 91 86 9F
UTF-16	3918	0F4E	3998	0F9E	43116	A86C	55302 56856	D806 DE18	55301 56350	D805 DC1E	55303 56348	D807 DC1C	55300 56735	D804 DD9F
Numeric character reference	&#3918;	&#xF4E;	&#3998;	&#xF9E;	&#43116;	&#xA86C;	&#72216;	&#x11A18;	&#70686;	&#x1141E;	&#72732;	&#x11C1C;	&#70047;	&#x1119F;

Character information
Preview	ဏ		ᨱ	
Unicode name	MYANMAR LETTER NNA		TAI THAM LETTER RANA	
Encodings	decimal	hex	dec	hex
Unicode	4111	U+100F	6705	U+1A31
UTF-8	225 128 143	E1 80 8F	225 168 177	E1 A8 B1
Numeric character reference	&#4111;	&#x100F;	&#6705;	&#x1A31;

Character information
Preview	ណ		ຓ		ณ	
Unicode name	KHMER LETTER NNO		LAO LETTER PALI NNA		THAI CHARACTER NO NEN	
Encodings	decimal	hex	dec	hex	dec	hex
Unicode	6030	U+178E	3731	U+0E93	3603	U+0E13
UTF-8	225 158 142	E1 9E 8E	224 186 147	E0 BA 93	224 184 147	E0 B8 93
Numeric character reference	&#6030;	&#x178E;	&#3731;	&#xE93;	&#3603;	&#xE13;

Character information
Preview	ණ		𑄕		𑤚		ꢠ	
Unicode name	SINHALA LETTER MUURDHAJA NAYANNA		CHAKMA LETTER NNAA		DIVES AKURU LETTER NNA		SAURASHTRA LETTER NNA	
Encodings	decimal	hex	dec	hex	dec	hex	dec	hex
Unicode	3499	U+0DAB	69909	U+11115	71962	U+1191A	43168	U+A8A0
UTF-8	224 182 171	E0 B6 AB	240 145 132 149	F0 91 84 95	240 145 164 154	F0 91 A4 9A	234 162 160	EA A2 A0
UTF-16	3499	0DAB	55300 56597	D804 DD15	55302 56602	D806 DD1A	43168	A8A0
Numeric character reference	&#3499;	&#xDAB;	&#69909;	&#x11115;	&#71962;	&#x1191A;	&#43168;	&#xA8A0;

Character information
Preview	𑘜		𑦼		𑩪			
Unicode name	MODI LETTER NNA		NANDINAGARI LETTER NNA		SOYOMBO LETTER NNA		KAITHI LETTER NNA	
Encodings	decimal	hex	dec	hex	dec	hex	dec	hex
Unicode	71196	U+1161C	72124	U+119BC	72298	U+11A6A	69789	U+1109D
UTF-8	240 145 152 156	F0 91 98 9C	240 145 166 188	F0 91 A6 BC	240 145 169 170	F0 91 A9 AA	240 145 130 157	F0 91 82 9D
UTF-16	55301 56860	D805 DE1C	55302 56764	D806 DDBC	55302 56938	D806 DE6A	55300 56477	D804 DC9D
Numeric character reference	&#71196;	&#x1161C;	&#72124;	&#x119BC;	&#72298;	&#x11A6A;	&#69789;	&#x1109D;

Character information
Preview	𑒝		𑱾	
Unicode name	TIRHUTA LETTER NNA		MARCHEN LETTER PA	
Encodings	decimal	hex	dec	hex
Unicode	70813	U+1149D	72830	U+11C7E
UTF-8	240 145 146 157	F0 91 92 9D	240 145 177 190	F0 91 B1 BE
UTF-16	55301 56477	D805 DC9D	55303 56446	D807 DC7E
Numeric character reference	&#70813;	&#x1149D;	&#72830;	&#x11C7E;

Character information
Preview	𑚘		𑠘		𑈘		𑋌		𑅢		𑊔	
Unicode name	TAKRI LETTER NNA		DOGRA LETTER NNA		KHOJKI LETTER NNA		KHUDAWADI LETTER NNA		MAHAJANI LETTER NNA		MULTANI LETTER DDHA	
Encodings	decimal	hex	dec	hex	dec	hex	dec	hex	dec	hex	dec	hex
Unicode	71320	U+11698	71704	U+11818	70168	U+11218	70348	U+112CC	69986	U+11162	70292	U+11294
UTF-8	240 145 154 152	F0 91 9A 98	240 145 160 152	F0 91 A0 98	240 145 136 152	F0 91 88 98	240 145 139 140	F0 91 8B 8C	240 145 133 162	F0 91 85 A2	240 145 138 148	F0 91 8A 94
UTF-16	55301 56984	D805 DE98	55302 56344	D806 DC18	55300 56856	D804 DE18	55300 57036	D804 DECC	55300 56674	D804 DD62	55300 56980	D804 DE94
Numeric character reference	&#71320;	&#x11698;	&#71704;	&#x11818;	&#70168;	&#x11218;	&#70348;	&#x112CC;	&#69986;	&#x11162;	&#70292;	&#x11294;

Character information
Preview	ᬡ		ꦟ	
Unicode name	BALINESE LETTER NA RAMBAT		JAVANESE LETTER NA MURDA	
Encodings	decimal	hex	dec	hex
Unicode	6945	U+1B21	43423	U+A99F
UTF-8	225 172 161	E1 AC A1	234 166 159	EA A6 9F
Numeric character reference	&#6945;	&#x1B21;	&#43423;	&#xA99F;

Character information
Preview	𑴚	
Unicode name	MASARAM GONDI LETTER NNA	
Encodings	decimal	hex
Unicode	72986	U+11D1A
UTF-8	240 145 180 154	F0 91 B4 9A
UTF-16	55303 56602	D807 DD1A
Numeric character reference	&#72986;	&#x11D1A;
