= Ra (Indic) =

Letter "Ra" in Indic scripts

Example glyphs
- Assamese: ৰ
- Bengali: Ra
- Tibetan: Ra
- Tamil: Ra
- Thai: ร
- Malayalam: ര
- Sinhala: ර
- Ashoka Brahmi: Ra
- Devanagari: Ra

Cognates
- Hebrew: ר
- Greek: Ρ
- Latin: R
- Cyrillic: Р

Properties
- Phonemic representation: /ɾ/
- IAST transliteration: r R
- ISCII code point: CF (207)

Ra is a consonant of Indic abugidas. In modern Indic scripts, Ra is derived from the early "Ashoka" Brahmi letter after having gone through the Gupta letter. Most Indic scripts have differing forms of Ra when used in combination with other consonants, including subjoined and repha forms. Some of these are encoded in computer text as separate characters, while others are generated dynamically using conjunct shaping with a virama.

== Āryabhaṭa numeration ==
Aryabhata used Devanagari letters for numbers, very similar to the Greek numerals, even after the invention of Indian numerals. The values of the different forms of र are:

- र [ɾə] = 40 (४०)
- रि [ɾɪ] = 4,000 (४ ०००)
- रु [ɾʊ] = 400,000 (४ ०० ०००)
- रृ [ɾri] = 40,000,000 (४ ०० ०० ०००)
- रॢ [ɾlə] = 4×10^{9} (४×१०^{९})
- रे [ɾe] = 4×10^{11} (४×१०^{११})
- रै [ɾɛː] = 4×10^{13} (४×१०^{१३})
- रो [ɾoː] = 4×10^{15} (४×१०^{१५})
- रौ [ɾɔː] = 4×10^{17} (४×१०^{१७})

== Historic Ra ==
There are three different general early historic scripts - Brahmi and its variants, Kharoṣṭhī, and Tocharian, the so-called slanting Brahmi. Ra as found in standard Brahmi,, was a simple geometric shape, with variations toward more flowing forms by the Gupta. The Tocharian Ra had an alternate Fremdzeichen form,. The third form of ra, in Kharoshthi, was probably derived from Aramaic separately from the Brahmi letter.

=== Brahmi Ra ===
The Brahmi letter, Ra, is probably derived from the Aramaic Resh, and is thus related to the modern Latin R and Greek Rho. Several identifiable styles of writing the Brahmi Ra can be found, most associated with a specific set of inscriptions from an artifact or diverse records from an historic period. As the earliest and most geometric style of Brahmi, the letters found on the Edicts of Ashoka and other records from around that time are normally the reference form for Brahmi letters, with vowel marks not attested until later forms of Brahmi back-formed to match the geometric writing style.

Brahmi Ra historic forms
Ashoka (3rd-1st c. BCE)	Girnar (~150 BCE)	Kushana (~150-250 CE)	Gujarat (~250 CE)	Gupta (~350 CE)

=== Tocharian Ra ===
The Tocharian letter is derived from the Brahmi, and has an alternate Fremdzeichen form used in conjuncts and as an alternate representation of Rä. The use of repha forms in modern Indic scripts is similar to the Fremdzeichen Ra in Tocharian.

Tocharian Ra with vowel marks
Ra	Rā	Ri	Rī	Ru	Rū	Rr	Rr̄	Re	Rai	Ro	Rau	Rä	Fremdzeichen

=== Kharoṣṭhī Ra ===
The Kharoṣṭhī letter is generally accepted as being derived from the Aramaic Resh, and is thus related to R and Rho, in addition to the Brahmi Ra.

== Devanagari Ra ==
Ra (र) is a consonant of the Devanagari abugida. It ultimately arose from the Brahmi letter, after having gone through the Gupta letter. Letters that derive from it are the Gujarati letter ર, and the Modi letter 𑘨. Ra, along with the Latin capital letter R, is the basis of the currency symbol ₹, which represents the Indian rupee.

=== Devanagari-using languages ===
In all languages, र is pronounced as [ɾə] or [ɾ] when appropriate. Like all Indic scripts, Devanagari uses vowel marks attached to the base consonant to override the inherent /ə/ vowel:

Devanagari र with vowel marks
Ra	Rā	Ri	Rī	Ru	Rū	Rr	Rr̄	Rl	Rl̄	Re	Rai	Ro	Rau	R
र	रा	रि	री	रु	रू	रृ	रॄ	रॢ	रॣ	रे	रै	रो	रौ	र्

Several languages use the dotted form Rra for the [r] sound instead of र. ऱ combines with vowel marks identically to र.

=== Conjuncts with र ===
Devanagari Repha

Devanagari Rakar

Eyelash Ra

Devanagari exhibits conjunct ligatures, as is common in Indic scripts. In modern Devanagari texts, most conjuncts are formed by reducing the letter shape to fit tightly to the following letter, usually by dropping a character's vertical stem, sometimes referred to as a "half form". Some conjunct clusters are always represented by a true ligature, instead of a shape that can be broken into constituent independent letters. Vertically stacked conjuncts are ubiquitous in older texts, while only a few are still used routinely in modern Devanagari texts. The use of ligatures and vertical conjuncts may vary across languages using the Devanagari, with Marathi in particular preferring the use of half forms where texts in other languages would show ligatures and vertical stacks.

When in conjuncts with other letters, र takes on several different forms, the most important of which are Repha and Rakar. Repha is used to indicate that a conjunct begins with "R". It is crescent shape attached atop the headline of the rest of the conjunct at the right, immediately above the vertical stem, if present. The other members of the conjunct ignore Repha for shaping, combining with the other members of the conjunct to form ligatures or stacked conjuncts normally.

Rakar is used to indicate a consonant conjunct ending in "Ra". It is an upward-pointing wedge shape that is found either centered below the rest of the conjunct, or tilted to the right and integrated with the bottom of the stemline. Like with Repha, the rest of the conjunct ignores Rakar for shaping, except for minor alteration of the bottom of any stemline.

The third conjunct form of Ra is the so-called Eyelash Ra. It resembles a half-form in retaining the head line, with a shape below that connects to the following letter, but this remaining eyelash shape does not resemble either र or ऱ. The eyelash Ra is used in Nepali and Marathi texts instead of Repha for an initial "R" sound in a conjunct. Even though those languages both use the dotted Ra ऱ, eyelash Ra is the default form of Ra + Virama in Unicode for backwards compatibility, and the Repha form is mapped individually as a ligature with each other Devanagari consonant.

==== Devanagari Repha ====
- Repha र্ (r) + ब (ba) gives the ligature rba: ^{note}

- Repha र্ (r) + भ (b^{h}a) gives the ligature rb^{h}a:

- Repha र্ (r) + च (ca) gives the ligature rca:

- Repha र্ (r) + छ (c^{h}a) gives the ligature rc^{h}a:

- Repha र্ (r) + द (da) gives the ligature rda:

- Repha र্ (r) + ड (ḍa) gives the ligature rḍa:

- Repha र্ (r) + ढ (ḍʱa) gives the ligature rḍʱa:

- Repha र্ (r) + द্ (d) + ध (dʱa) gives the ligature rddʱa:

- Repha र্ (r) + ध (dʱa) gives the ligature rdʱa:

- Repha र্ (r) + द্ (d) + व (va) gives the ligature rdva:

- Repha र্ (r) + ग (ga) gives the ligature rga:

- Repha र্ (r) + घ (ɡʱa) gives the ligature rɡʱa:

- Repha र্ (r) + ह (ha) gives the ligature rha:

- Repha र্ (r) + ज (ja) gives the ligature rja:

- Repha र্ (r) + झ (j^{h}a) gives the ligature rj^{h}a:

- Repha र্ (r) + ज্ (j) + ञ (ña) gives the ligature rjña:

- Repha र্ (r) + क (ka) gives the ligature rka:

- Repha र্ (r) + ख (k^{h}a) gives the ligature rk^{h}a:

- Repha र্ (r) + क্ (k) + ष (ṣa) gives the ligature rkṣa:

- Repha र্ (r) + ल (la) gives the ligature rla:

- Repha र্ (r) + ळ (ḷa) gives the ligature rḷa:

- Repha र্ (r) + म (ma) gives the ligature rma:

- Repha र্ (r) + न (na) gives the ligature rna:

- Repha र্ (r) + ङ (ŋa) gives the ligature rŋa:

- Repha र্ (r) + ङ্ (ŋ) + ग (ga) gives the ligature rŋga:

- Repha र্ (r) + ण (ṇa) gives the ligature rṇa:

- Repha र্ (r) + ञ (ña) gives the ligature rña:

- Repha र্ (r) + प (pa) gives the ligature rpa:

- Repha र্ (r) + फ (p^{h}a) gives the ligature rp^{h}a:

- Repha र্ (r) + र (ra) gives the ligature rra:

- Repha र্ (r) + स (sa) gives the ligature rsa:

- Repha र্ (r) + श (ʃa) gives the ligature rʃa:

- Repha र্ (r) + ष (ṣa) gives the ligature rṣa:

- Repha र্ (r) + स্ (s) + व (va) gives the ligature rsva:

- Repha र্ (r) + त (ta) gives the ligature rta:

- Repha र্ (r) + थ (t^{h}a) gives the ligature rt^{h}a:

- Repha र্ (r) + ट (ṭa) gives the ligature rṭa:

- Repha र্ (r) + त্ (t) + त (ta) gives the ligature rtta:

- Repha र্ (r) + ठ (ṭ^{h}a) gives the ligature rṭ^{h}a:

- Repha र্ (r) + व (va) gives the ligature rva:

- Repha र্ (r) + य (ya) gives the ligature rya:

==== Devanagari Rakar ====
- भ্ (b^{h}) + र (ra) gives the ligature b^{h}ra:

- ब্ (b) + र (ra) gives the ligature bra:

- छ্ (c^{h}) + र (ra) gives the ligature c^{h}ra:

- च্ (c) + र (ra) gives the ligature cra:

- द্ (d) + ब্ (b) + र (ra) gives the ligature dbra:

- ढ্ (ḍʱ) + र (ra) gives the ligature ḍʱra:

- ड্ (ḍ) + र (ra) gives the ligature ḍra:

- द্ (d) + द্ (d) + र (ra) gives the ligature ddra:

- द্ (d) + ग্ (g) + र (ra) gives the ligature dgra:

- ध্ (dʱ) + र (ra) gives the ligature dʱra:

- द্ (d) + र (ra) gives the ligature dra:

- घ্ (ɡʱ) + र (ra) gives the ligature ɡʱra:

- ग্ (g) + र (ra) gives the ligature gra:

- ग্ (g) + र্ (r) + य (ya) gives the ligature grya:

- ह্ (h) + र (ra) gives the ligature hra:

- झ্ (j^{h}) + र (ra) gives the ligature j^{h}ra:

- ज্ (j) + र (ra) gives the ligature jra:

- क্ (k) + र (ra) gives the ligature kra:

- क্ (k) + त্ (t) + र (ra) gives the ligature ktra:

- ळ্ (ḷ) + र (ra) gives the ligature ḷra:

- ल্ (l) + र (ra) gives the ligature lra:

- म্ (m) + र (ra) gives the ligature mra:

- ङ্ (ŋ) + क্ (k) + र (ra) gives the ligature ŋkra:

- ङ্ (ŋ) + र (ra) gives the ligature ŋra:

- ण্ (ṇ) + र (ra) gives the ligature ṇra:

- न্ (n) + र (ra) gives the ligature nra:

- ञ্ (ñ) + र (ra) gives the ligature ñra:

- फ্ (p^{h}) + र (ra) gives the ligature p^{h}ra:

- प্ (p) + र (ra) gives the ligature pra:

- प্ (p) + त্ (t) + र (ra) gives the ligature ptra:

- श্ (ʃ) + र (ra) gives the ligature ʃra:

- स্ (s) + र (ra) gives the ligature sra:

- ष্ (ṣ) + क্ (k) + र (ra) gives the ligature ṣkra:

- ष্ (ṣ) + र (ra) gives the ligature ṣra:

- थ্ (t^{h}) + र (ra) gives the ligature t^{h}ra:

- त্ (t) + र (ra) gives the ligature tra:

- त্ (t) + र্ (r) + य (ya) gives the ligature trya:

- ठ্ (ṭ^{h}) + र (ra) gives the ligature ṭ^{h}ra:

- ट্ (ṭ) + र (ra) gives the ligature ṭra:

- त্ (t) + त্ (t) + र (ra) gives the ligature ttra:

- व্ (v) + र (ra) gives the ligature vra:

- य্ (y) + र (ra) gives the ligature yra:

===== Conjuncts with both Repha and Rakar forms =====
- र্ (r) + ध্ (dʱ) + र (ra) gives the ligature rdʱra:

- र্ (r) + ष্ (ṣ) + ट্ (ṭ) + र (ra) gives the ligature rṣṭra:

- र্ (r) + त্ (t) + र (ra) gives the ligature rtra:

- र্ (r) + त্ (t) + त্ (t) + र (ra) gives the ligature rttra:

==== Devanagari Eyelash Ra ====
- Eyelash र্ (r) + ब (ba) gives the ligature rba:

- Eyelash र্ (r) + भ (b^{h}a) gives the ligature rb^{h}a:

- Eyelash र্ (r) + च (ca) gives the ligature rca:

- Eyelash र্ (r) + छ (c^{h}a) gives the ligature rc^{h}a:

- Eyelash र্ (r) + द (da) gives the ligature rda:

- Eyelash र্ (r) + ड (ḍa) gives the ligature rḍa:

- Eyelash र্ (r) + ढ (ḍʱa) gives the ligature rḍʱa:

- Eyelash र্ (r) + ध (dʱa) gives the ligature rdʱa:

- Eyelash र্ (r) + ग (ga) gives the ligature rga:

- Eyelash र্ (r) + घ (ɡʱa) gives the ligature rɡʱa:

- Eyelash र্ (r) + ह (ha) gives the ligature rha:

- Eyelash र্ (r) + ज (ja) gives the ligature rja:

- Eyelash र্ (r) + झ (j^{h}a) gives the ligature rj^{h}a:

- Eyelash र্ (r) + ज্ (j) + ञ (ña) gives the ligature rjña:

- Eyelash र্ (r) + क (ka) gives the ligature rka:

- Eyelash र্ (r) + ख (k^{h}a) gives the ligature rk^{h}a:

- Eyelash र্ (r) + क্ (k) + ष (ṣa) gives the ligature rkṣa:

- Eyelash र্ (r) + ल (la) gives the ligature rla:

- Eyelash र্ (r) + ळ (ḷa) gives the ligature rḷa:

- Eyelash र্ (r) + म (ma) gives the ligature rma:

- Eyelash र্ (r) + न (na) gives the ligature rna:

- Eyelash र্ (r) + ङ (ŋa) gives the ligature rŋa:

- Eyelash र্ (r) + ण (ṇa) gives the ligature rṇa:

- Eyelash र্ (r) + ञ (ña) gives the ligature rña:

- Eyelash र্ (r) + प (pa) gives the ligature rpa:

- Eyelash र্ (r) + फ (p^{h}a) gives the ligature rp^{h}a:

- Eyelash र্ (r) + स (sa) gives the ligature rsa:

- Eyelash र্ (r) + श (ʃa) gives the ligature rʃa:

- Eyelash र্ (r) + ष (ṣa) gives the ligature rṣa:

- Eyelash र্ (r) + त (ta) gives the ligature rta:

- Eyelash र্ (r) + थ (t^{h}a) gives the ligature rt^{h}a:

- Eyelash र্ (r) + ट (ṭa) gives the ligature rṭa:

- Eyelash र্ (r) + ठ (ṭ^{h}a) gives the ligature rṭ^{h}a:

- Eyelash र্ (r) + व (va) gives the ligature rva:

- Eyelash र্ (r) + य (ya) gives the ligature rya:

== Bengali/Assamese Ra ==
The Bengali script র and Assamese script ৰ are derived from the Siddhaṃ, and are marked by a similar horizontal head line, but less geometric shape, than their Devanagari counterpart, र. The inherent vowel of Bengali consonant letters is /ɔ/, so the bare letter র will sometimes be transliterated as "ro" instead of "ra". Adding okar, the "o" vowel mark, gives a reading of /ro/. Although the inherent vowel of Assamese consonant letters is different (/ɑ/), the bare letter ৰ is also transliterated as "ro" or "ra". Like all Indic consonants, র/ৰ can be modified by marks to indicate another (or no) vowel than its inherent "a".

Bengali র / Assamese ৰ with vowel marks
ra	rā	ri	rī	ru	rū	rr	rr̄	re	rai	ro	rau	r
র	রা	রি	রী	রু	রূ	রৃ	রৄ	রে	রৈ	রো	রৌ	র্
ৰ	ৰা	ৰি	ৰী	ৰু	ৰূ	ৰৃ	ৰৄ	ৰে	ৰৈ	ৰো	ৰৌ	ৰ্

=== র/ৰ in languages using Bengali-Assamese ===
র or ৰ is used as a basic consonant character in many of the Bengali-Assamese script orthographies, including Bengali and Assamese. Bengali uses র and Assamese uses ৰ. In Assamese, র was used earlier for wa but now it is standardised as a separate letter ৱ.

=== Conjuncts with র/ৰ ===
Bengali/Assamese র/ৰ exhibit conjunct ligatures, as is common in Indic scripts. Much like other Indic scripts, Bengali-Assamese র/ৰ also rarely appear in conjuncts in full form, and have special unrelated graphic forms for both initial and trailing র/ৰ in conjuncts called Repha and Ra phala (in Bengali) or Ra kar (in Assamese).

==== Bengali/Assamese Ra-phala/kar ====
Bengali-Assamese Ra-phala/kar

The letters র/ৰ have a special form when used as the last letter of a conjunct called "Ra phala/kar" (or "Ro pholo"). This reduced form of র/ৰ is appended to the bottom of a letter or conjunct. Both Ya and Va have a similar "phala" trailing form. Ra-phala and Ya-phala can be found together in many conjuncts.

- ভ্ (b^{h}) + র/ৰ (ra) gives the ligature b^{h}ra:

- ব্ (b) + র/ৰ (ra) gives the ligature bra:

- চ্ (c) + ছ্ (c^{h}) + র/ৰ (ra) gives the ligature cc^{h}ra:

- দ্ (d) + ভ্ (b^{h}) + র/ৰ (ra) gives the ligature db^{h}ra:

- ঢ্ (ḍʱ) + র/ৰ (ra) gives the ligature ḍʱra:

- ড্ (ḍ) + র/ৰ (ra) gives the ligature ḍra:

- ধ্ (dʱ) + র/ৰ (ra) gives the ligature dʱra:

- দ্ (d) + র/ৰ (ra) gives the ligature dra:

- দ্ (d) + র্/ৰ্ (r) + য (ya) gives the ligature drya, with the ya phala suffix in addition to ra phala:

- গ্ (g) + ধ্ (dʱ) + র/ৰ (ra) gives the ligature gdʱra:

- ঘ্ (ɡʱ) + র/ৰ (ra) gives the ligature ɡʱra:

- গ্ (g) + র/ৰ (ra) gives the ligature gra:

- গ্ (g) + র্/ৰ (r) + য (ya) gives the ligature grya, with the ya phala suffix in addition to ra phala:

- জ্ (j) + র/ৰ (ra) gives the ligature jra:

- খ্ (k^{h}) + র/ৰ (ra) gives the ligature k^{h}ra:

- ক্ (k) + র/ৰ (ra) gives the ligature kra:

- ক্ (k) + ত্ (t) + র/ৰ (ra) gives the ligature ktra:

- ক্ (k) + ট্ (ṭ) + র/ৰ (ra) gives the ligature kṭra:

- ম্ (m) + ভ্ (b^{h}) + র/ৰ (ra) gives the ligature mb^{h}ra:

- ম্ (m) + প্ (p) + র/ৰ (ra) gives the ligature mpra:

- ম্ (m) + র/ৰ (ra) gives the ligature mra:

- ম্ (m) + ব্ (v) + র/ৰ (ra) gives the ligature mvra:

- ন্ (n) + ড্ (ḍ) + র/ৰ (ra) gives the ligature nḍra:

- ন্ (n) + ধ্ (dʱ) + র/ৰ (ra) gives the ligature ndʱra:

- ন্ (n) + দ্ (d) + র/ৰ (ra) gives the ligature ndra:

- ঙ্ (ŋ) + ঘ্ (ɡʱ) + র/ৰ (ra) gives the ligature ŋɡʱra:

- ঙ্ (ŋ) + ক্ (k) + র/ৰ (ra) gives the ligature ŋkra:

- ণ্ (ṇ) + ড্ (ḍ) + র/ৰ (ra) gives the ligature ṇḍra:

- ন্ (n) + থ্ (t^{h}) + র/ৰ (ra) gives the ligature nt^{h}ra:

- ন্ (n) + ত্ (t) + র/ৰ (ra) gives the ligature ntra:

- ন্ (n) + ত্ (t) + র্/ৰ্ (r) + য (ya) gives the ligature ntrya, with the ya phala suffix in addition to ra phala:

- ন্ (n) + ট্ (ṭ) + র/ৰ (ra) gives the ligature nṭra:

- ফ্ (p^{h}) + র/ৰ (ra) gives the ligature p^{h}ra:

- প্ (p) + র/ৰ (ra) gives the ligature pra:

- প্ (p) + র্/ৰ (r) + য (ya) gives the ligature prya, with the ya phala suffix in addition to ra phala:

- শ্ (ʃ) + র/ৰ (ra) gives the ligature ʃra:

- স্ (s) + ক্ (k) + র/ৰ (ra) gives the ligature skra:

- স্ (s) + র/ৰ (ra) gives the ligature sra:

- ষ্ (ṣ) + ক্ (k) + র/ৰ (ra) gives the ligature ṣkra:

- ষ্ (ṣ) + প্ (p) + র/ৰ (ra) gives the ligature ṣpra:

- ষ্ (ṣ) + ট্ (ṭ) + র/ৰ (ra) gives the ligature ṣṭra:

- স্ (s) + ত্ (t) + র/ৰ (ra) gives the ligature stra:

- স্ (s) + ট্ (ṭ) + র/ৰ (ra) gives the ligature sṭra:

- থ্ (t^{h}) + র/ৰ (ra) gives the ligature t^{h}ra:

- ত্ (t) + র/ৰ (ra) gives the ligature tra:

- ত্ (t) + র্/ৰ (r) + য (ya) gives the ligature trya, with the ya phala suffix in addition to ra phala:

- ট্ (ṭ) + র/ৰ (ra) gives the ligature ṭra:

==== Bengali/Assamese Repha ====
Bengali-Assamese Repha

Unlike other letters, র/ৰ also have a special form when used as the initial letter of a conjunct called "Repha". This reduced form of র is on top of the following letter or conjunct. Repha can be found in combination with Ra-phala, Ya-phala/kar and Va-phala/kar in many conjuncts.

- র্ (r) + ভ (b^{h}a) gives the ligature rb^{h}a:

- র্ (r) + ব্ (b) + য (ya) gives the ligature rbya, with the ya phala suffix:

- র্ (r) + চ (ca) gives the ligature rca:

- র্ (r) + ছ (c^{h}a) gives the ligature rc^{h}a:

- র্ (r) + চ্ (c) + য (ya) gives the ligature rcya, with the ya phala suffix in addition to repha:

- র্ (r) + দ (da) gives the ligature rda:

- র্ (r) + ড (ḍa) gives the ligature rḍa:

- র্ (r) + ঢ্ (ḍʱ) + য (ya) gives the ligature rḍʱya, with the ya phala suffix in addition to repha:

- র্ (r) + ধ (dʱa) gives the ligature rdʱa:

- র্ (r) + ধ্ (dʱ) + ব (va) gives the ligature rdʱva, with the va phala suffix in addition to repha:

- র্ (r) + দ্ (d) + র (ra) gives the ligature rdra:

- র্ (r) + দ্ (d) + ব (va) gives the ligature rdva, with the va phala suffix in addition to repha:

- র্ (r) + গ (ga) gives the ligature rga:

- র্ (r) + ঘ (ɡʱa) gives the ligature rɡʱa:

- র্ (r) + (ɡʱ) + য (ya) gives the ligature rɡʱya, with the ya phala suffix in addition to repha:

- র্ (r) + গ্ (ga) + য (ya) gives the ligature rɡya, with the ya phala suffix in addition to repha:

- র্ (r) + হ (ha) gives the ligature rha:

- র্ (r) + হ্ (h) + য (ya) gives the ligature rhya, with the ya phala suffix in addition to repha:

- র্ (r) + জ (ja) gives the ligature rja:

- র্ (r) + ঝ (j^{h}a) gives the ligature rj^{h}a:

- র্ (r) + জ্ (j) + য (ya) gives the ligature rjya, with the ya phala suffix in addition to repha:

- র্ (r) + ক (ka) gives the ligature rka:

- র্ (r) + খ (k^{h}a) gives the ligature rk^{h}a:

- র্ (r) + খ্ (k^{h}) + য (ya) gives the ligature rk^{h}ya, with the ya phala suffix in addition to repha:

- র্ (r) + ক্ (k) + য (ya) gives the ligature rkya, with the ya phala suffix in addition to repha:

- র্ (r) + ল (la) gives the ligature rla:

- র্ (r) + ম (ma) gives the ligature rma:

- র্ (r) + ম্ (m) + য (ya) gives the ligature rmya, with the ya phala suffix in addition to repha:

- র্ (r) + ন (na) gives the ligature rna:

- র্ (r) + ণ (ṇa) gives the ligature rṇa:

- র্ (r) + ণ্ (ṇ) + য (ya) gives the ligature rṇya, with the ya phala suffix in addition to repha:

- র্ (r) + প (pa) gives the ligature rpa:

- র্ (r) + ফ (p^{h}a) gives the ligature rp^{h}a:

- র্ (r) + স (sa) gives the ligature rsa:

- র্ (r) + শ (ʃa) gives the ligature rʃa:

- র্ (r) + শ্ (ʃ) + ব (va) gives the ligature rʃva, with the va phala suffix in addition to repha:

- র্ (r) + শ্ (ʃ) + য (ya) gives the ligature rʃya, with the ya phala suffix in addition to repha:

- র্ (r) + ষ (ṣa) gives the ligature rṣa:

- র্ (r) + ষ্ (ṣ) + য (ya) gives the ligature rṣya, with the ya phala suffix in addition to repha:

- র্ (r) + ত (ta) gives the ligature rta:

- র্ (r) + থ (t^{h}a) gives the ligature rt^{h}a:

- র্ (r) + থ্ (t^{h}) + য (ya) gives the ligature rt^{h}ya, with the ya phala suffix in addition to repha:

- র্ (r) + ত্ (t) + র (ra) gives the ligature rtra:

- র্ (r) + ট (ṭa) gives the ligature rṭa:

- র্ (r) + ত্ (t) + য (ya) gives the ligature rtya, with the ya phala suffix in addition to repha:

- র্ (r) + য (ya) gives the ligature rya, with repha, not ya phala:

== Gujarati Ra ==
Gujarati Ra.

Ra (ર) is twenty-seventh consonant of the Gujarati abugida. It is derived from the Devanagari Ra with the top bar (shiro rekha) removed, and ultimately the Brahmi letter. When combined with certain vowels, the Gujarati Ra may assume unique forms, such as રુ and રૂ.

=== Gujarati-using Languages ===
The Gujarati script is used to write the Gujarati and Kutchi languages. In both languages, ર is pronounced as [rə] or [r] when appropriate. Like all Indic scripts, Gujarati uses vowel marks attached to the base consonant to override the inherent /ə/ vowel:

Ra	Rā	Ri	Rī	Ru	Rū	Rr	Rl	Rr̄	Rl̄	Rĕ	Re	Rai	Rŏ	Ro	Rau	R
Gujarati Ra syllables, with vowel marks in red.

=== Conjuncts with ર ===
Gujarati Repha

Gujarati Rakar

Gujarati ર exhibits conjunct ligatures, much like its parent Devanagari Script. While most Gujarati conjuncts can only be formed by reducing the letter shape to create a "half form" that fits tightly to following letter, Ra does not have a half form. A few conjunct clusters can be represented by a true ligature, instead of a shape that can be broken into constituent independent letters, and vertically stacked conjuncts can also be found in Gujarati, although much less commonly than in Devanagari. True ligatures are quite rare in Indic scripts. The most common ligated conjuncts in Gujarati are in the form of a slight mutation to fit in context or as a consistent variant form appended to the adjacent characters. The most common conjunct variants are the Repha and Rakar forms of Ra. A leading consonant or conjunct will use its full form, rather than half form, when being modified by a trailing Rakar.

Repha	Rakar
* ર્ (r) + ક (ka) gives the ligature RKa: ર્ (r) + ખ (k^{h}a) gives the ligature RKha: ર્ (r) + ગ (ga) gives the ligature RGa: ર્ (r) + ઘ (ɡʱa) gives the ligature RGha: ર્ (r) + ઙ (ŋa) gives the ligature RṄa: ર્ (r) + ચ (ca) gives the ligature RCa: ર્ (r) + છ (c^{h}a) gives the ligature RCha: ર્ (r) + જ (ja) gives the ligature RJa: ર્ (r) + ઝ (j^{h}a) gives the ligature RJha: ર્ (r) + ઞ (ɲa) gives the ligature RÑa: ર્ (r) + ટ (ʈa) gives the ligature RṬa: ર્ (r) + ઠ (ʈ^{h}a) gives the ligature RṬha: ર્ (r) + ડ (ɖa) gives the ligature RḌa: ર્ (r) + ઢ (ɖʱa) gives the ligature RḌha: ર્ (r) + ણ (ɳa) gives the ligature RṆa: ર્ (r) + ત (ta) gives the ligature RTa: ર્ (r) + થ (t^{h}a) gives the ligature RTha: ર્ (r) + દ (da) gives the ligature RDa: ર્ (r) + ધ (dʱa) gives the ligature RDha: ર્ (r) + ન (na) gives the ligature RNa: ર્ (r) + પ (pa) gives the ligature RPa: ર્ (r) + ફ (p^{h}a) gives the ligature RPha: ર્ (r) + બ (ba) gives the ligature RBa: ર્ (r) + ભ (b^{h}a) gives the ligature RBha: ર્ (r) + મ (ma) gives the ligature RMa: ર્ (r) + ય (ya) gives the ligature RYa: ર્ (r) + લ (la) gives the ligature RLa: ર્ (r) + ળ (ɭ̆a) gives the ligature Ra: ર્ (r) + વ (va) gives the ligature RVa: ર્ (r) + શ (ʃa) gives the ligature RŚa: ર્ (r) + ષ (ʂa) gives the ligature RṢa: ર્ (r) + સ (sa) gives the ligature RSa: ર્ (r) + હ (ha) gives the ligature RHa: ર્ (r) + ક (ka) ષ (ʂa) gives the ligature RKṢa: ર્ (r) + જ (ja) ઞ (ɲa) gives the ligature RJÑa: ર્ (r) + ર (ra) gives the ligature RRa:	* ક્ (k) + ર (ra) gives the ligature KRa: ખ્ (k^{h}) + ર (ra) gives the ligature KhRa: ગ્ (g) + ર (ra) gives the ligature GRa: ઘ્ (ɡʱ) + ર (ra) gives the ligature GhRa: ઙ્ (ŋ) + ર (ra) gives the ligature ṄRa: ચ્ (c) + ર (ra) gives the ligature CRa: છ્ (c^{h}) + ર (ra) gives the ligature ChRa: જ્ (j) + ર (ra) gives the ligature JRa: ઝ્ (j^{h}) + ર (ra) gives the ligature JhRa: ઞ્ (ɲ) + ર (ra) gives the ligature ÑRa: ટ્ (ʈ) + ર (ra) gives the ligature ṬRa: ડ્ (ɖ) + ર (ra) gives the ligature ḌRa: ઠ્ (ʈ^{h}) + ર (ra) gives the ligature ṬhRa: ઢ્ (ɖʱ) + ર (ra) gives the ligature ḌhRa: ણ્ (ɳ) + ર (ra) gives the ligature ṆRa: ત્ (t) + ર (ra) gives the ligature TRa: થ્ (t^{h}) + ર (ra) gives the ligature ThRa: દ્ (d) + ર (ra) gives the ligature DRa: ધ્ (dʱ) + ર (ra) gives the ligature DhRa: ન્ (n) + ર (ra) gives the ligature NRa: પ્ (p) + ર (ra) gives the ligature PRa: ફ્ (p^{h}) + ર (ra) gives the ligature PhRa: બ્ (b) + ર (ra) gives the ligature BRa: ભ્ (b^{h}) + ર (ra) gives the ligature BhRa: મ્ (m) + ર (ra) gives the ligature MRa: ય્ (y) + ર (ra) gives the ligature YRa: લ્ (l) + ર (ra) gives the ligature LRa: ળ્ (ɭ̆) + ર (ra) gives the ligature Ra: વ્ (v) + ર (ra) gives the ligature VRa: શ્ (ʃ) + ર (ra) gives the ligature ŚRa: ષ્ (ʂ) + ર (ra) gives the ligature ṢRa: સ્ (s) + ર (ra) gives the ligature SRa: હ્ (h) + ર (ra) gives the ligature HRa: ક્ (k) + ષ (ʂa) ર (ra) gives the ligature KṢRa: જ્ (j) + ઞ (ɲa) ર (ra) gives the ligature JÑRa:

== Telugu Ra ==
Telugu independent and subjoined Ra.

Ra (ర) is a consonant of the Telugu abugida. It ultimately arose from the Brahmi letter. It is closely related to the Kannada letter ರ. Most Telugu consonants contain a v-shaped headstroke that is related to the horizontal headline found in other Indic scripts, although headstrokes do not connect adjacent letters in Telugu. The headstroke is normally lost when adding vowel matras. Telugu conjuncts are created by reducing trailing letters to a subjoined form that appears below the initial consonant of the conjunct. Like the Rakar forms in other Indic scripts, the subjoined Ra in Telugu is not immediately related to the full form of Ra. Unlike other the Repha in other Indic scripts, there is no special prefix form of Ra in Telugu. Ligature conjuncts are not a feature in Telugu, with the only non-standard construction being an alternate subjoined form of Ṣa (borrowed from Kannada) in the KṢa conjunct.

=== Telugu Rra ===
Telugu independent and subjoined Rra.

In addition, Telugu also contains a second /r/ consonant, Rra (ఱ). It is closely related to the Kannada letter ಱ. Since it lacks the v-shaped headstroke common to most Telugu letters, ఱ remains unaltered by most vowel matras, and its subjoined form is simply a smaller version of the normal letter shape.

== Malayalam Ra ==
Malayalam letter Ra

Ra (ര) is a consonant of the Malayalam abugida. It ultimately arose from the Brahmi letter, via the Grantha letter Ra. Like in other Indic scripts, Malayalam consonants have the inherent vowel "a", and take one of several modifying vowel signs to represent syllables with another vowel or no vowel at all.

Malayalam Ra matras: Ra, Rā, Ri, Rī, Ru, Rū, Rr̥, Rr̥̄, Rl̥, Rl̥̄, Re, Rē, Rai, Ro, Rō, Rau, and R.

=== Conjuncts of ര ===
Malayalam Chillu R and conjoining Ra

As is common in Indic scripts, Malayalam joins letters together to form conjunct consonant clusters. There are several ways in which conjuncts are formed in Malayalam texts: using a post-base form of a trailing consonant placed under the initial consonant of a conjunct, a combined ligature of two or more consonants joined together, a conjoining form that appears as a combining mark on the rest of the conjunct, the use of an explicit candrakkala mark to suppress the inherent "a" vowel, or a special consonant form called a "chillu" letter, representing a bare consonant without the inherent "a" vowel. Like in most Indic scripts, Malayalam Ra has special forms, including a chillu letter and a conjoining form for a trailing ra, which appears before the other elements of a conjunct but is pronounced after. Texts written with the modern reformed Malayalam orthography, put̪iya lipi, may favor more regular conjunct forms than older texts in paḻaya lipi, due to changes undertaken in the 1970s by the Government of Kerala.

- ക് (k) + ര (ra) gives the ligature kra:

- ഖ് (k^{h}) + ര (ra) gives the ligature k^{h}ra:

- ഗ് (g) + ര (ra) gives the ligature gra:

- ഘ് (ɡʱ) + ര (ra) gives the ligature ɡʱra:

=== Malayalam Ṟa ===
Malayalam letter Ṟa

Ṟa (റ) is a consonant of the Malayalam abugida. It is related to the Malayalam Ra consonant and has a similar pronunciation.

Malayalam Ṟa matras: Ṟa, Ṟā, Ṟi, Ṟī, Ṟu, Ṟū, Ṟr̥, Ṟr̥̄, Ṟl̥, Ṟl̥̄, Ṟe, Ṟē, Ṟai, Ṟo, Ṟō, Ṟau, and Ṟ.

==== Conjuncts of റ ====
As is common in Indic scripts, Malayalam joins letters together to form conjunct consonant clusters. There are several ways in which conjuncts are formed in Malayalam texts: using a post-base form of a trailing consonant placed under the initial consonant of a conjunct, a combined ligature of two or more consonants joined together, a conjoining form that appears as a combining mark on the rest of the conjunct, the use of an explicit candrakkala mark to suppress the inherent "a" vowel, or a special consonant form called a "chillu" letter, representing a bare consonant without the inherent "a" vowel. Texts written with the modern reformed Malayalam orthography, put̪iya lipi, may favor more regular conjunct forms than older texts in paḻaya lipi, due to changes undertaken in the 1970s by the Government of Kerala.

- ന് (n) + റ (ṟa) gives the ligature nṟa:

- റ് (ṟ) + റ (ṟa) gives the ligature ṟṟa:

== Canadian Aboriginal Syllabics Re ==
ᕂ, ᕆ, ᕈ and ᕋ are the base characters "Re", "Ri", "Ro" and "Ra" in the Canadian Aboriginal Syllabics. The bare consonant ᕐ (R) is a small version of the A-series letter ᕋ, although the Western Cree letter ᕑ, derived from Pitman shorthand was the original bare consonant symbol for R. The character ᕂ is derived from a handwritten form of the Devanagari letter र, without the headline or vertical stem, and the forms for different vowels are derived by mirroring and rotation. Unlike most writing systems without legacy computer encodings, complex Canadian syllabic letters are represented in Unicode with pre-composed characters, rather than with base characters and diacritical marks.

Variant	E-series		I-series	O-series	A-series		Other
R + vowel	ᕂ	ᕃ	ᕆ	ᕈ	ᕋ		ᣅ
R + vowel	Re	Cree Re	Ri	Ro	Ra		Ray
Small	-		-	-	ᕐ		-
Small	-		-	-	R		-
R with long vowels	-		ᕇ	ᕉ	ᕌ		ᕅ
R with long vowels	-		Rī	Rō	Rā		Rāi
R + W-vowels	ᣠ		ᣏ	ᣑ	ᣓ		-
R + W-vowels	Cree Rwe		Rwi	Rwo	Rwa		Rway
R + long W-vowels	ᣎ		ᣐ	ᣒ	ᕎ	ᕏ	-
R + long W-vowels	Rwē		Rwī	Rwō	Rwā	Cree Rwā	-
Related characters	-		-	-	ᕒ		ᕑ
Related characters					Medial R		Cree R

== Odia Ra ==
Odia independent letter Ra

Ra (ର) is a consonant of the Odia abugida. It ultimately arose from the Brahmi letter, via the Siddhaṃ letter Ra. Like in other Indic scripts, Odia consonants have the inherent vowel "a", and take one of several modifying vowel signs to represent syllables with another vowel or no vowel at all.

Odia Ra with vowel matras
Ra	Rā	Ri	Rī	Ru	Rū	Rr̥	Rr̥̄	Rl̥	Rl̥̄	Re	Rai	Ro	Rau	R
ର	ରା	ରି	ରୀ	ରୁ	ରୂ	ରୃ	ରୄ	ରୢ	ରୣ	ରେ	ରୈ	ରୋ	ରୌ	ର୍

=== Conjuncts of ର ===
Odia Repha and Ra Phala

s is common in Indic scripts, Odia joins letters together to form conjunct consonant clusters. The most common conjunct formation is achieved by using a small subjoined form of trailing consonants. Most consonants' subjoined forms are identical to the full form, just reduced in size, although a few drop the curved headline or have a subjoined form not directly related to the full form of the consonant. The subjoined form of Ra is one of these mismatched forms, and is referred to as "Ra Phala". In addition, an initial Ra is indicated with a special form called "Repha". The Repha and Ra-Phala forms are the only way conjuncts with Ra are made.

==== Odia Repha ====
- ର୍ (r) + କ (ka) gives the ligature rka:

- ର୍ (r) + ଖ (k^{h}a) gives the ligature rk^{h}a:

- ର୍ (r) + ଗ (ga) gives the ligature rga:

- ର୍ (r) + ଘ (ɡʱa) gives the ligature rɡʱa:

- ର୍ (r) + ଙ (ŋa) gives the ligature rŋa:

- ର୍ (r) + ର (ra) gives the ligature rra:

==== Odia Ra Phala ====
- କ୍ (k) + ର (ra) gives the ligature kra:

- ଖ୍ (k^{h}) + ର (ra) gives the ligature k^{h}ra:

- ଗ୍ (g) + ର (ra) gives the ligature gra:

- ଘ୍ (ɡʱ) + ର (ra) gives the ligature ɡʱra:

- ଙ୍ (ŋ) + ର (ra) gives the ligature ŋra:

- ଲ୍ (l) + ର (ra) gives the ligature lra:

== Tirhuta Ra ==
Tirhuta consonant Ra

Ra (𑒩) is a consonant of the Tirhuta abugida. It ultimately arose from the Brahmi letter, via the Siddhaṃ letter Ra. Like in other Indic scripts, Tirhuta consonants have the inherent vowel "a", and take one of several modifying vowel signs to represent sylables with another vowel or no vowel at all.

Tirhuta Ra with vowel matras
Ra	Rā	Ri	Rī	Ru	Rū	Rṛ	Rṝ	Rḷ	Rḹ	Rē	Re	Rai	Rō	Ro	Rau	R
𑒩	𑒩𑒰	𑒩𑒱	𑒩𑒲	𑒩𑒳	𑒩𑒴	𑒩𑒵	𑒩𑒶	𑒩𑒷	𑒩𑒸	𑒩𑒹	𑒩𑒺	𑒩𑒻	𑒩𑒼	𑒩𑒽	𑒩𑒾	𑒩𑓂

=== Conjuncts of 𑒩 ===
As is common in Indic scripts, Tirhuta joins letters together to form conjunct consonant clusters. Conjuncts of ra in almost all scripts are indicated with a repha or rakar mark attached to the adjacent consonant cluster.

- 𑒦୍ (bʰ) + 𑒩 (ra) gives the ligature bʰra:

- 𑒕୍ (cʰ) + 𑒩 (ra) gives the ligature cʰra:

- 𑒔୍ (c) + 𑒩 (ra) gives the ligature cra:

- 𑒜୍ (ḍʱ) + 𑒩 (ra) gives the ligature ḍʱra:

- 𑒛୍ (ḍ) + 𑒩 (ra) gives the ligature ḍra:

- 𑒡୍ (dʱ) + 𑒩 (ra) gives the ligature dʱra:

- 𑒠୍ (d) + 𑒩 (ra) gives the ligature dra:

- 𑒒୍ (ɡʱ) + 𑒩 (ra) gives the ligature ɡʱra:

- 𑒑୍ (g) + 𑒩 (ra) gives the ligature gra:

- 𑒯୍ (h) + 𑒩 (ra) gives the ligature hra:

- 𑒗୍ (jʰ) + 𑒩 (ra) gives the ligature jʰra:

- 𑒖୍ (j) + 𑒩 (ra) gives the ligature jra:

- 𑒐୍ (kʰ) + 𑒩 (ra) gives the ligature kʰra:

- 𑒏୍ (k) + 𑒩 (ra) gives the ligature kra:

- 𑒪୍ (l) + 𑒩 (ra) gives the ligature lra:

- 𑒧୍ (m) + 𑒩 (ra) gives the ligature mra:

- 𑒓୍ (ŋ) + 𑒩 (ra) gives the ligature ŋra:

- 𑒝୍ (ṇ) + 𑒩 (ra) gives the ligature ṇra:

- 𑒢୍ (n) + 𑒩 (ra) gives the ligature nra:

- 𑒘୍ (ñ) + 𑒩 (ra) gives the ligature ñra:

- 𑒤୍ (pʰ) + 𑒩 (ra) gives the ligature pʰra:

- 𑒣୍ (p) + 𑒩 (ra) gives the ligature pra:

- 𑒩୍ (r) + 𑒥 (ba) gives the ligature rba:

- 𑒩୍ (r) + 𑒦 (bʰa) gives the ligature rbʰa:

- 𑒩୍ (r) + 𑒔 (ca) gives the ligature rca:

- 𑒩୍ (r) + 𑒕 (cʰa) gives the ligature rcʰa:

- 𑒩୍ (r) + 𑒠 (da) gives the ligature rda:

- 𑒩୍ (r) + 𑒛 (ḍa) gives the ligature rḍa:

- 𑒩୍ (r) + 𑒡 (dʱa) gives the ligature rdʱa:

- 𑒩୍ (r) + 𑒑 (ga) gives the ligature rga:

- 𑒩୍ (r) + 𑒒 (ɡʱa) gives the ligature rɡʱa:

- 𑒩୍ (r) + 𑒯 (ha) gives the ligature rha:

- 𑒩୍ (r) + 𑒖 (ja) gives the ligature rja:

- 𑒩୍ (r) + 𑒗 (jʰa) gives the ligature rjʰa:

- 𑒩୍ (r) + 𑒖୍ (j) + 𑒘 (ña) gives the ligature rjña:

- 𑒩୍ (r) + 𑒏 (ka) gives the ligature rka:

- 𑒩୍ (r) + 𑒐 (kʰa) gives the ligature rkʰa:

- 𑒩୍ (r) + 𑒏୍ (k) + 𑒭 (ṣa) gives the ligature rkṣa:

- 𑒩୍ (r) + 𑒪 (la) gives the ligature rla:

- 𑒩୍ (r) + 𑒧 (ma) gives the ligature rma:

- 𑒩୍ (r) + 𑒢 (na) gives the ligature rna:

- 𑒩୍ (r) + 𑒓 (ŋa) gives the ligature rŋa:

- 𑒩୍ (r) + 𑒝 (ṇa) gives the ligature rṇa:

- 𑒩୍ (r) + 𑒘 (ña) gives the ligature rña:

- 𑒩୍ (r) + 𑒣 (pa) gives the ligature rpa:

- 𑒩୍ (r) + 𑒤 (pʰa) gives the ligature rpʰa:

- 𑒩୍ (r) + 𑒩 (ra) gives the ligature rra:

- 𑒩୍ (r) + 𑒮 (sa) gives the ligature rsa:

- 𑒩୍ (r) + 𑒬 (ʃa) gives the ligature rʃa:

- 𑒩୍ (r) + 𑒭 (ṣa) gives the ligature rṣa:

- 𑒩୍ (r) + 𑒞 (ta) gives the ligature rta:

- 𑒩୍ (r) + 𑒟 (tʰa) gives the ligature rtʰa:

- 𑒩୍ (r) + 𑒙 (ṭa) gives the ligature rṭa:

- 𑒩୍ (r) + 𑒚 (ṭʰa) gives the ligature rṭʰa:

- 𑒩୍ (r) + 𑒫 (va) gives the ligature rva:

- 𑒩୍ (r) + 𑒨 (ya) gives the ligature rya:

- 𑒬୍ (ʃ) + 𑒩 (ra) gives the ligature ʃra:

- 𑒮୍ (s) + 𑒩 (ra) gives the ligature sra:

- 𑒭୍ (ṣ) + 𑒩 (ra) gives the ligature ṣra:

- 𑒟୍ (tʰ) + 𑒩 (ra) gives the ligature tʰra:

- 𑒞୍ (t) + 𑒩 (ra) gives the ligature tra:

- 𑒚୍ (ṭʰ) + 𑒩 (ra) gives the ligature ṭʰra:

- 𑒙୍ (ṭ) + 𑒩 (ra) gives the ligature ṭra:

- 𑒫୍ (v) + 𑒩 (ra) gives the ligature vra:

- 𑒨୍ (y) + 𑒩 (ra) gives the ligature yra:

Unlike other conjuncts, the letter Ba 𑒥 does not add a rakar form when followed by Ra 𑒩:

- 𑒥୍ (b) + 𑒩 (ra) has an explicit virama bra:

Ra 𑒩 is one of the few Tirhuta letters that forms true ligatures when attached to some vowel matras:

- 𑒩 (r) + 𑒳 (u) gives the ligature ru:

- 𑒩 (r) + 𑒴 (ū) gives the ligature rū:

== Kaithi Ra ==
Kaithi bare Ra consonant.

Ra (𑂩) is a consonant of the Kaithi abugida. It ultimately arose from the Brahmi letter, via the Siddhaṃ letter Ra. Like in other Indic scripts, Kaithi consonants have the inherent vowel "a", and take one of several modifying vowel signs to represent syllables with another vowel or no vowel at all.

Kaithi Ra with vowel matras
Ra	Rā	Ri	Rī	Ru	Rū	Re	Rai	Ro	Rau	R
𑂩	𑂩𑂰	𑂩𑂱	𑂩𑂲	𑂩𑂳	𑂩𑂴	𑂩𑂵	𑂩𑂶	𑂩𑂷	𑂩𑂸	𑂩𑂹𑂩𑂹

=== Conjuncts of 𑂩 ===
As is common in Indic scripts, Kaithi joins letters together to form conjunct consonant clusters. As is common in most Indic scripts, conjuncts of ra are indicated with a repha or rakar mark attached to the rest of the consonant cluster.

Kaithi Repha and Rakar.

==== Repha ====
Kaithi repha takes the form of a crescent attached to the top of a following consonant or consonant cluster.

- 𑂩୍ (r) + 𑂍 (ka) gives the ligature rka:

==== Rakar ====
Kaithi rakar take the form of a diagonal stroke attached near the bottom of the vertical stem of the preceding consonant or consonant cluster.

- 𑂍୍ (k) + 𑂩 (ra) gives the ligature kra:

== Comparison of Ra ==
The various Indic scripts are generally related to each other through adaptation and borrowing, and as such the glyphs for cognate letters, including Ra, are related as well.

Comparison of Ra in different scripts

Aramaic
Kharoṣṭhī 𐨪	Ashoka Brahmi	Kushana Brahmi (Note: The middle "Kushana" form of Brahmi is a later style that emerged as Brahmi scripts were beginning to proliferate. Gupta Brahmi was definitely a stylistic descendant from Kushana, but other Brahmi-derived scripts may have descended from earlier forms.)	Tocharian (Note: Tocharian is probably derived from the middle period "Kushana" form of Brahmi, although artifacts from that time are not plentiful enough to establish a definite succession.) /
Gupta Brahmi	Pallava
Kadamba -
Bhaiksuki 𑰨	Siddhaṃ	Grantha 𑌰	Cham ꨣ
Sinhala ර	Pyu / Old Mon (Note: Pyu and Old Mon are probably the precursors of the Burmese script, and may be derived from either the Pallava or Kadamba script) -
Tibetan	Newa 𑐬	Ahom 𑜍	Malayalam ര
Telugu ర	Burmese ရ
Lepcha ᰛ	Ranjana	Saurashtra ꢬ	Dives Akuru 𑤧
Kannada ರ	Kayah Li ꤚ
Limbu ᤖ	Soyombo (Note: May also be derived from Devangari (see bottom left of table)) 𑩼	Khmer រ	Tamil
Chakma 𑄢	Tai Tham ᩁ
Meitei Mayek ꯔ	Gaudi -	Thai ร	Lao ຣ / ຮ
Tai Le -
Marchen 𑲊	Tirhuta 𑒩	New Tai Lue ᦣ	Tai Viet ꪦ / ꪧ	Aksara Kawi
'Phags-pa ꡘ	Odia ର	Sharada 𑆫	Rejang ꤽ	Batak ᯒ	Buginese ᨑ
Zanabazar Square 𑨫	Bengali-Assamese	Takri 𑚤	Javanese ꦫ	Balinese ᬭ	Makasar 𑻭
Hangul (Note: The Origin of Hangul from 'Phags-pa is one of limited influence, inspiring at most a few basic letter shapes. Hangul does not function as an Indic abugida.) -	Northern Nagari -	Dogri 𑠤	Laṇḍā -	Sundanese ᮛ	Baybayin -
Modi 𑘨	Gujarati ર	Khojki 𑈦	Khudabadi 𑋙	Mahajani 𑅭	Tagbanwa -
Devanagari	Nandinagari 𑧈	Kaithi 𑂩	Gurmukhi ਰ	Multani 𑊢	Buhid ᝍ
Canadian Syllabics (Note: Although the basic letter forms of the Canadian Aboriginal Syllabics were derived from handwritten Devanagari letters, this abugida indicates vowel sounds by rotations of the letter form, rather than the use of vowel diacritics as is standard in Indic abugidas.) ᕂ	Soyombo (Note: May also be derived from Ranjana (see above)) 𑩼	Sylheti Nagari ꠞ	Gunjala Gondi 𑶈	Masaram Gondi (Note: Masaram Gondi acts as an Indic abugida, but its letterforms were not derived from any single precursor script.) 𑴦	Hanuno'o ᜭ

== Character encodings of Ra ==
Most Indic scripts are encoded in the Unicode Standard, and as such the letter Ra in those scripts can be represented in plain text with unique codepoint. Ra from several modern-use scripts can also be found in legacy encodings, such as ISCII.

Character information
Preview							ర		ର		ರ		ര		ર		ਰ	
Unicode name	DEVANAGARI LETTER RA		BENGALI LETTER RA		TAMIL LETTER RA		TELUGU LETTER RA		ORIYA LETTER RA		KANNADA LETTER RA		MALAYALAM LETTER RA		GUJARATI LETTER RA		GURMUKHI LETTER RA	
Encodings	decimal	hex	dec	hex	dec	hex	dec	hex	dec	hex	dec	hex	dec	hex	dec	hex	dec	hex
Unicode	2352	U+0930	2480	U+09B0	2992	U+0BB0	3120	U+0C30	2864	U+0B30	3248	U+0CB0	3376	U+0D30	2736	U+0AB0	2608	U+0A30
UTF-8	224 164 176	E0 A4 B0	224 166 176	E0 A6 B0	224 174 176	E0 AE B0	224 176 176	E0 B0 B0	224 172 176	E0 AC B0	224 178 176	E0 B2 B0	224 180 176	E0 B4 B0	224 170 176	E0 AA B0	224 168 176	E0 A8 B0
Numeric character reference	&#2352;	&#x930;	&#2480;	&#x9B0;	&#2992;	&#xBB0;	&#3120;	&#xC30;	&#2864;	&#xB30;	&#3248;	&#xCB0;	&#3376;	&#xD30;	&#2736;	&#xAB0;	&#2608;	&#xA30;
ISCII	207	CF	207	CF	207	CF	207	CF	207	CF	207	CF	207	CF	207	CF	207	CF

Character information
Preview	Ashoka Kushana Gupta		𐨪				𑌰	
Unicode name	BRAHMI LETTER RA		KHAROSHTHI LETTER RA		SIDDHAM LETTER RA		GRANTHA LETTER RA	
Encodings	decimal	hex	dec	hex	dec	hex	dec	hex
Unicode	69677	U+1102D	68138	U+10A2A	71080	U+115A8	70448	U+11330
UTF-8	240 145 128 173	F0 91 80 AD	240 144 168 170	F0 90 A8 AA	240 145 150 168	F0 91 96 A8	240 145 140 176	F0 91 8C B0
UTF-16	55300 56365	D804 DC2D	55298 56874	D802 DE2A	55301 56744	D805 DDA8	55300 57136	D804 DF30
Numeric character reference	&#69677;	&#x1102D;	&#68138;	&#x10A2A;	&#71080;	&#x115A8;	&#70448;	&#x11330;

Character information
Preview			ྲ		ꡘ		𑨫		𑐬		𑰨		𑆫	
Unicode name	TIBETAN LETTER RA		TIBETAN SUBJOINED LETTER RA		PHAGS-PA LETTER RA		ZANABAZAR SQUARE LETTER RA		NEWA LETTER RA		BHAIKSUKI LETTER RA		SHARADA LETTER RA	
Encodings	decimal	hex	dec	hex	dec	hex	dec	hex	dec	hex	dec	hex	dec	hex
Unicode	3938	U+0F62	4018	U+0FB2	43096	U+A858	72235	U+11A2B	70700	U+1142C	72744	U+11C28	70059	U+111AB
UTF-8	224 189 162	E0 BD A2	224 190 178	E0 BE B2	234 161 152	EA A1 98	240 145 168 171	F0 91 A8 AB	240 145 144 172	F0 91 90 AC	240 145 176 168	F0 91 B0 A8	240 145 134 171	F0 91 86 AB
UTF-16	3938	0F62	4018	0FB2	43096	A858	55302 56875	D806 DE2B	55301 56364	D805 DC2C	55303 56360	D807 DC28	55300 56747	D804 DDAB
Numeric character reference	&#3938;	&#xF62;	&#4018;	&#xFB2;	&#43096;	&#xA858;	&#72235;	&#x11A2B;	&#70700;	&#x1142C;	&#72744;	&#x11C28;	&#70059;	&#x111AB;

Character information
Preview	ရ		ᦣ	
Unicode name	MYANMAR LETTER RA		NEW TAI LUE LETTER LOW HA	
Encodings	decimal	hex	dec	hex
Unicode	4123	U+101B	6563	U+19A3
UTF-8	225 128 155	E1 80 9B	225 166 163	E1 A6 A3
Numeric character reference	&#4123;	&#x101B;	&#6563;	&#x19A3;

- See further below for Tai Tham codepoints.

Character information
Preview	រ		ຣ		ຮ		ร		ꪦ		ꪧ	
Unicode name	KHMER LETTER RO		LAO LETTER LO LING		LAO LETTER HO TAM		THAI CHARACTER RO RUA		TAI VIET LETTER LOW RO		TAI VIET LETTER HIGH RO	
Encodings	decimal	hex	dec	hex	dec	hex	dec	hex	dec	hex	dec	hex
Unicode	6042	U+179A	3747	U+0EA3	3758	U+0EAE	3619	U+0E23	43686	U+AAA6	43687	U+AAA7
UTF-8	225 158 154	E1 9E 9A	224 186 163	E0 BA A3	224 186 174	E0 BA AE	224 184 163	E0 B8 A3	234 170 166	EA AA A6	234 170 167	EA AA A7
Numeric character reference	&#6042;	&#x179A;	&#3747;	&#xEA3;	&#3758;	&#xEAE;	&#3619;	&#xE23;	&#43686;	&#xAAA6;	&#43687;	&#xAAA7;

Character information
Preview	ර		ꤚ		𑄢		𑜍		𑤧		ꢬ		ꨣ	
Unicode name	SINHALA LETTER RAYANNA		KAYAH LI LETTER RA		CHAKMA LETTER RAA		AHOM LETTER RA		DIVES AKURU LETTER RA		SAURASHTRA LETTER RA		CHAM LETTER RA	
Encodings	decimal	hex	dec	hex	dec	hex	dec	hex	dec	hex	dec	hex	dec	hex
Unicode	3515	U+0DBB	43290	U+A91A	69922	U+11122	71437	U+1170D	71975	U+11927	43180	U+A8AC	43555	U+AA23
UTF-8	224 182 187	E0 B6 BB	234 164 154	EA A4 9A	240 145 132 162	F0 91 84 A2	240 145 156 141	F0 91 9C 8D	240 145 164 167	F0 91 A4 A7	234 162 172	EA A2 AC	234 168 163	EA A8 A3
UTF-16	3515	0DBB	43290	A91A	55300 56610	D804 DD22	55301 57101	D805 DF0D	55302 56615	D806 DD27	43180	A8AC	43555	AA23
Numeric character reference	&#3515;	&#xDBB;	&#43290;	&#xA91A;	&#69922;	&#x11122;	&#71437;	&#x1170D;	&#71975;	&#x11927;	&#43180;	&#xA8AC;	&#43555;	&#xAA23;

Character information
Preview	𑘨		𑧈		𑩼		ꠞ		𑶈			
Unicode name	MODI LETTER RA		NANDINAGARI LETTER RA		SOYOMBO LETTER RA		SYLOTI NAGRI LETTER RO		GUNJALA GONDI LETTER RA		KAITHI LETTER RA	
Encodings	decimal	hex	dec	hex	dec	hex	dec	hex	dec	hex	dec	hex
Unicode	71208	U+11628	72136	U+119C8	72316	U+11A7C	43038	U+A81E	73096	U+11D88	69801	U+110A9
UTF-8	240 145 152 168	F0 91 98 A8	240 145 167 136	F0 91 A7 88	240 145 169 188	F0 91 A9 BC	234 160 158	EA A0 9E	240 145 182 136	F0 91 B6 88	240 145 130 169	F0 91 82 A9
UTF-16	55301 56872	D805 DE28	55302 56776	D806 DDC8	55302 56956	D806 DE7C	43038	A81E	55303 56712	D807 DD88	55300 56489	D804 DCA9
Numeric character reference	&#71208;	&#x11628;	&#72136;	&#x119C8;	&#72316;	&#x11A7C;	&#43038;	&#xA81E;	&#73096;	&#x11D88;	&#69801;	&#x110A9;

Character information
Preview	𑒩		ᰛ		ᤖ		ꯔ		𑲊	
Unicode name	TIRHUTA LETTER RA		LEPCHA LETTER RA		LIMBU LETTER RA		MEETEI MAYEK LETTER RAI		MARCHEN LETTER RA	
Encodings	decimal	hex	dec	hex	dec	hex	dec	hex	dec	hex
Unicode	70825	U+114A9	7195	U+1C1B	6422	U+1916	43988	U+ABD4	72842	U+11C8A
UTF-8	240 145 146 169	F0 91 92 A9	225 176 155	E1 B0 9B	225 164 150	E1 A4 96	234 175 148	EA AF 94	240 145 178 138	F0 91 B2 8A
UTF-16	55301 56489	D805 DCA9	7195	1C1B	6422	1916	43988	ABD4	55303 56458	D807 DC8A
Numeric character reference	&#70825;	&#x114A9;	&#7195;	&#x1C1B;	&#6422;	&#x1916;	&#43988;	&#xABD4;	&#72842;	&#x11C8A;

Character information
Preview	𑚤		𑠤		𑈦		𑋙		𑅭		𑊢	
Unicode name	TAKRI LETTER RA		DOGRA LETTER RA		KHOJKI LETTER RA		KHUDAWADI LETTER RA		MAHAJANI LETTER RA		MULTANI LETTER RA	
Encodings	decimal	hex	dec	hex	dec	hex	dec	hex	dec	hex	dec	hex
Unicode	71332	U+116A4	71716	U+11824	70182	U+11226	70361	U+112D9	69997	U+1116D	70306	U+112A2
UTF-8	240 145 154 164	F0 91 9A A4	240 145 160 164	F0 91 A0 A4	240 145 136 166	F0 91 88 A6	240 145 139 153	F0 91 8B 99	240 145 133 173	F0 91 85 AD	240 145 138 162	F0 91 8A A2
UTF-16	55301 56996	D805 DEA4	55302 56356	D806 DC24	55300 56870	D804 DE26	55300 57049	D804 DED9	55300 56685	D804 DD6D	55300 56994	D804 DEA2
Numeric character reference	&#71332;	&#x116A4;	&#71716;	&#x11824;	&#70182;	&#x11226;	&#70361;	&#x112D9;	&#69997;	&#x1116D;	&#70306;	&#x112A2;

Character information
Preview	ᬭ		ᯒ		ᨑ		ꦫ		𑻭		ꤽ		ᮛ	
Unicode name	BALINESE LETTER RA		BATAK LETTER RA		BUGINESE LETTER RA		JAVANESE LETTER RA		MAKASAR LETTER RA		REJANG LETTER RA		SUNDANESE LETTER RA	
Encodings	decimal	hex	dec	hex	dec	hex	dec	hex	dec	hex	dec	hex	dec	hex
Unicode	6957	U+1B2D	7122	U+1BD2	6673	U+1A11	43435	U+A9AB	73453	U+11EED	43325	U+A93D	7067	U+1B9B
UTF-8	225 172 173	E1 AC AD	225 175 146	E1 AF 92	225 168 145	E1 A8 91	234 166 171	EA A6 AB	240 145 187 173	F0 91 BB AD	234 164 189	EA A4 BD	225 174 155	E1 AE 9B
UTF-16	6957	1B2D	7122	1BD2	6673	1A11	43435	A9AB	55303 57069	D807 DEED	43325	A93D	7067	1B9B
Numeric character reference	&#6957;	&#x1B2D;	&#7122;	&#x1BD2;	&#6673;	&#x1A11;	&#43435;	&#xA9AB;	&#73453;	&#x11EED;	&#43325;	&#xA93D;	&#7067;	&#x1B9B;

Character information
Preview	ᝍ		ᜭ		𑴦	
Unicode name	BUHID LETTER RA		HANUNOO LETTER RA		MASARAM GONDI LETTER RA	
Encodings	decimal	hex	dec	hex	dec	hex
Unicode	5965	U+174D	5933	U+172D	72998	U+11D26
UTF-8	225 157 141	E1 9D 8D	225 156 173	E1 9C AD	240 145 180 166	F0 91 B4 A6
UTF-16	5965	174D	5933	172D	55303 56614	D807 DD26
Numeric character reference	&#5965;	&#x174D;	&#5933;	&#x172D;	&#72998;	&#x11D26;

Character information
Preview	ᕂ		ᕆ		ᕈ		ᕋ		ᕐ	
Unicode name	CANADIAN SYLLABICS RE		CANADIAN SYLLABICS RI		CANADIAN SYLLABICS RO		CANADIAN SYLLABICS RA		CANADIAN SYLLABICS R	
Encodings	decimal	hex	dec	hex	dec	hex	dec	hex	dec	hex
Unicode	5442	U+1542	5446	U+1546	5448	U+1548	5451	U+154B	5456	U+1550
UTF-8	225 149 130	E1 95 82	225 149 134	E1 95 86	225 149 136	E1 95 88	225 149 139	E1 95 8B	225 149 144	E1 95 90
Numeric character reference	&#5442;	&#x1542;	&#5446;	&#x1546;	&#5448;	&#x1548;	&#5451;	&#x154B;	&#5456;	&#x1550;

- The full range of RE Canadian syllabic characters can be found at the codepoint ranges 1542-1550, 1622-1627, 18CE-18D3, 18B0-18B3, 18DC-18DD.

Character information
Preview	ᩁ		ᩕ		᩺	
Unicode name	TAI THAM LETTER RA		TAI THAM CONSONANT SIGN MEDIAL RA		TAI THAM SIGN RA HAAM	
Encodings	decimal	hex	dec	hex	dec	hex
Unicode	6721	U+1A41	6741	U+1A55	6778	U+1A7A
UTF-8	225 169 129	E1 A9 81	225 169 149	E1 A9 95	225 169 186	E1 A9 BA
Numeric character reference	&#6721;	&#x1A41;	&#6741;	&#x1A55;	&#6778;	&#x1A7A;
