= Khaki (disambiguation) =

Khaki is a color.

Khaki may also refer to:

== Locations ==
- Khaki, East Azerbaijan
- Khaki, Lorestan
- Khaki Branazar
- Khaki-ye Olya (disambiguation), various places
- Khaki-ye Shekarabad
- Khaki-ye Sofla
- Khaki-ye Vosta

== Film and television ==
- Khaki (2007 film), 2007 Indian Malayalam-language film
- Khaki (2020 film), an Indian Kannada-language action film
- Khaki (upcoming film), an upcoming Indian Tamil-language action thriller film

== Other ==
- Khaki University, Canada (defunct)
- Adam Khaki, 14th-century Muslim saint
- Khaki trousers, which are normally khaki-colored chinos
- Khaki election, military influenced election
- Khaki drill, military uniform

== See also ==
- Kaki (disambiguation)
- Khakee (disambiguation)
- Kaakki Sattai (lit. 'Khaki Shirt'), 1985 Indian film
- Kakhi, a surname
