= Khaki, Iran =

Khaki (Persian: خاكي) may refer to:

- Khaki, East Azerbaijan
- Khaki, Lorestan
- Khaki Branazar
- Khaki-ye Olya (disambiguation), various places
- Khaki-ye Shekarabad
- Khaki-ye Sofla
- Khaki-ye Vosta
