= Kakki =

Kakki may refer to:

- Kakki, Bannu, a town of Bannu District in Pakistan
- Kakki nau, a village in Jhang district, Pakistan
- Kakki Reservoir in Pathanamthitta district of Kerala, India

== Kakki Nau City ==
- Kaki (disambiguation)
- Khaki (disambiguation)
