= Kaki =

Kaki may refer to:

== People ==
- Abubaker Kaki (born 1989), a Sudanese middle-distance runner
- Kaki King (born 1979), a musician

== Places ==
=== Iran ===
- Kaki, Hormozgan, a village in Hormozgan Province
- Kaki, Iran, a city in Bushehr Province
- Kaki District, a district in Bushehr Province
- Kaki Rural District, a rural district in Bushehr Province

=== Other places ===
- Kaki, French Polynesia, a village in northern Hao, in French Polynesia's Tuamotu Archipelago
- KaKi, or Kaltenkirchen, a town in Schleswig-Holstein, Germany

== Other ==
- Diospyros kaki or kaki, the Japanese persimmon, an edible fruit
- KAKI (FM), a radio station (88.1 FM) licensed to serve Juneau, Alaska, United States
- KBZU, a radio station (106.7 FM) licensed to serve Benton, Arkansas, United States, which held the call sign KAKI until 1992
- Kaki Klon Suphap, a traditional Thai folk tale, and the main character, Lady Kaki
  - Ka Kee, a 1980 Thai fantasy film based on the story
- Kakī, the Māori name of the black stilt, a critically endangered wading bird of New Zealand.

== See also ==
- Kaki Bukit (disambiguation)
- Kakki (disambiguation)
- Khaki (disambiguation)
- Kaka (disambiguation)
- Qakh (city)
