= List of police-related slang terms =

Many police-related slang terms exist for police officers. These terms are rarely used by the police themselves.

Police services also have their own internal slang and jargon; some of it is relatively widespread geographically and some very localized.

== A ==
Agua
Used in United States particularly by communities of significant Puerto Rican or hispanics in east coast or New England. Agua means water in Spanish, which is a play on the fact that police uniforms are usually blue. so declaring "Agua" outloud when engaged in criminal activity is shouted to signify the police presence.
Alphabet Agency/Alphabet Soup/Alphabet Bois
Used in the United States to denote the multiple federal agencies that are commonly referred to by their initials such as the FBI, ATF, and DEA.
Anda
An Urdu language word meaning egg, for the pure-white uniform of traffic police in urban Pakistani areas like Karachi.
Askar/Askari
A Somali term meaning “soldier” which is often used by Somali immigrants to the United Kingdom to refer to police. It is commonly used by rappers in UK drill.
Aynasız
A Turkish phrase derived from word ayna ("mirror"), referring to 'those without a mirror', a pejorative description of police lacking honor and having too much shame to look at themselves in the mirror. Often used by Turkish immigrants, particularly to describe police who will beat or assault them sans witnesses. Also, the first Renaults to enter the market in Turkey had no right rear-view mirrors. Most owners would simply get a mirror installed, but inasmuch as policemen did not want to pay out of pocket for one they were called "mirrorless" (aynasız).
Aina
See Aynasız. A Rinkeby Swedish slang term commonly used in immigrant-heavy areas to refer to police.

== B ==
Babylon
Jamaican slang for establishment systems, often applied to police. Derived from the Rastafari movement which, in turn, regards Babylon as symbolising debauchery, corruption and evil-doing in general. The term was used as the title of the 2014 British police drama Babylon.
Bacon
See Pig. Derogatory; derived from the term "Pig/Pigs"; can refer to a single officer or the police generally.
Bagieta
Polish slang term for police officer, that is: baguette and it is reference to police baton
BAC
French slang for police officer; acronym of the Brigade anti-criminalité in France.
Ballenjatter
Dutch, originating from police officers who confiscated the footballs of youngsters playing in the street.
Barney
Slang term, usually derogatory, for a town policeman; named for Barney Fife.
Battenburg
Referring to yellow and blue, large, squared, reflective checker pattern on UK police cars; refers to a type of cake. (Update from "Jam Sandwich" of earlier cars.)
Bausj, Bauers or Baosj
Norwegian slang derived from Berber meaning "boss, head"
Bängen
Swedish word rooted in slang meaning the devil wikt:bäng
Bears
Slang term for the police (citizen's band radio slang), "Smokey Bear” in reference to the Highway Patrol campaign hats. Seldom derogatory; very common with truckers in the US.
The Beast
US term used in this singular form to refer to any number of police officers, an entire police force, or police in general. This linguistic pattern results in an implied sense that individual police are all representative parts of one whole, monstrous creature with a united objective and attitude. Referenced most widely on The Fugees' album The Score and KRS-One's Sound of da Police.
Beat cop
Inoffensive slang for patrolling officers.
Benga
Czech slang term for police officers. Derived from Romani language word "beng" meaning devil or satan.
Bill
Also Old Bill. The Bill was the title of a television police series in the UK, based in a fictional London borough.
Bird
US, slang for a police helicopter. See also "Ghetto Bird". Not to be confused with the UK parallel to "chicks", a more modern and now more common use of "birds."
Bizzies
Also "busies". UK, Scouse dialect, said to be as the police were always too "busy" to help citizens who reported low-level crimes such as house burglaries. An likelier alternative origin is that the police are seen as "busybodies", i.e., they ask too many questions and meddle in the affairs of others.
Black Maria (pronounced "Mariah")
Slang term used in the UK, Ireland, and elsewhere; the police van used to transport prisoners, also used in the 19th century in the US and France with various suggested etymologies including racehorses or the infamous black, large, fierce Liverpool guesthouse owner, Maria Lea.
Black police
黑警. A derogatory Cantonese slang that refers to Hong Kong Police Force officer by pro-democracy supporters during the 2019–20 Hong Kong protests. Portmanteau for triad gangsters (黑社會) and police (警察) . See also triads for context.
Blackshirt
UK, derogatory name referencing the modern police uniforms and armed squads of Italian Fascists under Benito Mussolini.
Blues and Twos
UK, from the flashing blue lights and the two-tone siren on a police car.
Blueband
UK, from the blue cap-band worn by PCSOs.
Bluebottle
Antique name for the police referring to the old-style uniform.
Blue Canary
Canadian, a term used by firefighters to rib police officers. Miners historically used canaries to monitor the air quality of a mine; when the canary died, the air quality was considered unworkably poor. Police officers have been known to put themselves at risk when rendering aid, usually running into a fire or other toxic atmosphere without proper training or personal protective equipment. Antonym: Hose Monkey.
Blue Flu
US term for a bargaining tactic whereby police officers who are prohibited from taking strike action, call in sick en masse as a means of informally striking.
Blue Force
US slang term for the police, mainly used in Florida.
Blue Heeler
Australian slang term, particularly in rural areas, in reference to the blue appearance and traits of the Blue Heeler Australian Cattle Dog. Blue Heelers was a long-running Australian police television drama series.
Blue Light Special
Slang term for someone being pulled over.
Blue Lights
UK Slang term, originates from British police cars having blue lights.
Blue Meanies
1960s and 1970s hippie slang for the police in Britain, referring to the blue uniforms and inspired by the bad guys in the 1968 Beatles film Yellow Submarine.
Blå-blå
Norwegian slang meaning "blue-blue", derivative of "popo" and in reference to blue lights and former color of uniform.
Bobby
UK, derived from the Conservative British Home Secretary, Sir Robert Peel ("Bobby" being a nickname for "Robert"), the founder of the Metropolitan Police. Occurs in fixed phrases e.g. "bobby on the beat", "village bobby". Still used on UK Railways to describe signalmen and women, dating back to the earliest days of railway operations when a train driver was required to stop only at a policeman's order.
Bœuf
Quebec, ('ox'). Probably in opposition to the French term vache ('cow'), or for the usual featureless gaze of police officers colloquially called face de bœuf ('ox face'). Allows to call a police car an 'ox cart' (char à bœufs).
Booked
UK and US, usually after being arrested, to be taken to custody suite and held there in a cell. "They took me to the nick and they booked me." (Dizzie Rascal)
Bófia
A derogatory slang in Portugal used for police officers and law enforcement in general.
Booze Bus
Australian slang term referring to a police roadside random breath testing station, which are often specialized buses.
Boy Dem / Boydem / Bwoy Dem
Jamaican-origin slang term, also popular in the UK and Toronto.
The Boys
Term used by African-American communities in Baltimore.
Boys in Blue
In reference to the blue uniform.
Brady Cops
Police officers who have been dishonest are sometimes referred to as "Brady cops".
Bronze
Police slang term used in Mad Max; originated in Australia but used in the UK.
BTP
Specialised use (mainly on UK railways) – abbreviation of British Transport Police, the oldest and one of three UK national specialist police forces. Sometimes derogatorily known as "Sleepers" (US railroad "ties") but not due to their position in the track.
Buck Rogers
UK (London and south east) comic/derogatory reference to officer using speed trap gun.
Bull
Railroad police in the US, most prevalent in the first half of the 20th century.
Bulle
German for 'bull'. Slang for police officer, often derogatory. Bullerei and the plural Bullen refer to the police as a whole.
Buttons (The)
US, 1940s, referring to the large brass buttons of the era.
Byling
Old Swedish slang for patrolling officers. The word means "peeler" in Swedish and it is rarely used nowadays.

== C ==
Cana
South American slang term for police or jail.
Caraliu
(Romania, antiquated) A term used to designate law enforcement personnel of either sex, possibly derived from "caraulă", meaning "guard" or "sentinel".
Chimps
UK slang term for Community Support Officers, acronym for "Completely Hopeless in Most Policing Situations".
Chota
Central American and Mexico slang term for police.
Cig
Pronounced /ˈkiɡ/ with a hard C; used to refer to inspectors in the Irish police force, An Garda Síochána. Derived from the Irish name cigire.
Cop, Coppa or Copper
The term copper was the original word, used in Britain to mean "someone who captures". In British English, the term cop is recorded (Shorter Oxford Dictionary) in the sense of 'to capture' from 1704, derived from the Latin capere via the Old French caper. The OED suggests that "copper" is from "cop" in this sense, but adds that the derivation is uncertain. Many imaginative, but incorrect stories have come up over the years, including that cop refers to the police uniform's copper buttons, the police man's copper badge, or that it is an abbreviation for "constable on patrol", "constabulary of police", or "chief of police".
Cuicos
Central Mexico slang term for police. Most likely related to the slang for pig.

== D ==
Dogs
Slang term understood to compare police activity to that of dogs, i.e. sniffing around etc.
Ds
Slang for detectives, police.
Dibble
The name of fictional police officer in the cartoon Top Cat. "Dibble" has been adopted as a British-English slang term for police officer (can be in fun), especially one with Greater Manchester Police
Divvy van
police vehicle used to transport criminals around Comes from Victoria Police in Australia. The main response vehicle is called a 'Divisional Van', shortened to Divvy Van. Originally there was one van only to each police division, hence the term.

== F ==
Fakabát
An old Hungarian term meaning "wooden-coat". The name originates from World War II Hungarian army slang, where a wooden coat meant a box-like small wooden shelter at guard posts, just enough for a guard to step in and be somewhat protected from weather. Later, in the Socialist era, the police was issued with brownish vinyl jackets which became rigid in cold weather, and cops started calling them wooden coats, for they felt like actually wearing a guard box, as the name implies. The term is still widely known today.
Feds
Usually used in the United States to refer to federal law enforcement agencies, especially the Federal Bureau of Investigation and the United States Marshals Service. Also used in Australia to refer to the Australian Federal Police, and in London as general slang for the Metropolitan Police Service.
Federales
Spanish, the Mexican Federal Police. The term gained widespread usage by English speakers due to its popularization in films. The term is a cognate and counterpart to the slang "Feds" in the United States.
Feo
A term which indicates a law-enforcement officer approaching the speaker's vicinity. Taken from the Spanish word for "ugly", this slang term is exclusively used by the Puerto Rican and Dominican communities of Philadelphia and (to a lesser extent) New York City, United States.
Filth
Normally "The Filth", UK, the police. Inspiration for the Irvine Welsh novel Filth. Also common in Ireland, Australia and New Zealand.
Finest
A term originally used to describe the New York City Police Department, it has also been used to describe police departments in other large American cities. It has been used both supportively and sarcastically by the public to describe heroic acts and acts of incompetence and abuse, respectively.
Five-O
Derived from the name of the television series Hawaii Five-O, referring to Hawaiʻi's status as the fiftieth U.S. state, this term is used in the United States. Non-derogatory, e.g.: "If you notice a loose plastic cap over the card slot of an ATM, just call Five-O". It is sometimes shouted out as a warning by lookouts or others engaged in illegal activity when a police officer is spotted.
Fízl
Czech pejorative term for police officer.
Flatfoot
A term with uncertain origins. Possibly related to the large amount of walking that a police officer would do; at a time when the condition flat feet became common knowledge, it was assumed that excessive walking was a major cause. Another possible origin is the army's rejection of men with flat feet, who would often take jobs in law enforcement as a backup, particularly during war when established police officers would often join up (or be forced). What is known is that by 1912, flat-footed was an insult among U.S. baseball players, used against players not "on their toes." This may have been applied to police officers sometime later, for similar reasons.
Flic
A French word for police (singular "un flic", but more commonly used in the plural "les flics"), best translated as "cop". Much like "cop", this informal term is not derogatory. However, the extended version – "les flicailles" – adding the suffix -aille, is pejorative and corresponds to "pigs".
Fucking Big Idiots
Slang abbreviation for the Federal Bureau of Investigation. Derogatory.
Fuzz, the
Slang term for the police, possibly deriving from a mispronunciation or corruption of the phrase "the police force" or "the force". It may also refer to police radio static. The term was used in the title Hot Fuzz, a 2007 police-comedy film and Peter Peachfuzz from The Adventures of Rocky and Bullwinkle. The term is also referenced in the title of the Supergrass single "Caught by the Fuzz". In use from 1929 and of unknown origin, possibly American.

== G ==
Garcea
(Romanian) An extremely derogatory term for police officers. It derives from a sitcom character named Officer Garcea, who is portrayed as unintelligent.
Gabor
Romanian pejorative referring to police officers.
Gaiets
Russian, slang, Гаец, pl. Гайцы. Only slightly disparaging; in general use, to mean traffic police officers. From the historical abbreviation GAI (Russian: ГАИ – Государственная Автомобильная Инспекция for State Automobile Inspectorate).
Gavver
(UK, slang) A member of the police.
Gammon
UK, see Bacon.
Gestapo
Non-police-related slang term for door security (bouncers) in reference to their white armbands. Reference to the secret police of Nazi Germany, also called the Gestapo.
Ghetto Bird
US, derogatory, slang for a police helicopter patrolling over ghettos.
Glina
Polish for clay, widespread and non-derogatory term used for all police officers but specifically for higher-ranking or criminal police personnel.
Glowie
Slang for an American federal agent, often used online. Originates from a quote by Terry A. Davis.
Glatta
From Norwegian "glattcelle", meaning "holding cell".
Grass
Cockney (English) rhyming slang for a police informant: Grasshopper = Copper. Alternative suggestions are from "Narc in the Park", or the song "WhisperingGrass".
Green Onions
Slang for the Quebec Provincial Police (Sûreté du Québec), as their uniforms resemble Green Onions.
Gris
(Swedish for pig. Pronounced with a long i.) A derogatory term in Sweden for the whole police force or for a single police officer.
Grüne Minna
German for green Minna, short form of Wilhelmine. Denomination for a prisoner transport in Germany and Austria, also "Grüner August" (German for green August) in some regions in Germany (like Hamburg, Swabia), or "Grüner Heinrich" (German for green Henry) in Austria as well.
Gschmierte
For police officers, "Schmier" for the police, in Austrian German slang. Derogatory.
Gorra
Lower class Argentine slang, Spanish for "hat". Derogatory.
Governor
Old name for Police in the UK sometimes abbreviated to "Gov".
Guards or Guard
Ireland, slang for the Garda Síochána or one of its members. Shortened from English translation guardians of the peace.
Gumshoe
US, derogatory, slang for detectives, who allegedly wear soft-heeled shoes or Hush Puppy shoes so they can follow suspects without being noticed.

Gura
Latin American Spanish slang for police enforcement, derogatory.

== H ==
Ḥakem
Ḥakem (حاكم) is a Tunisian slang term for police, meaning "ruler" in Arabic.
Harness bull
American term for a uniformed officer. A reference to the Sam Browne belt that was formerly part of some police uniforms, also Harness cop, Harness man.

Havāladāra
Term meaning Constable in Marathi.

Heat or The Heat
For police and law enforcement in general (due to some police vehicles featuring red lights).

Hendek
French slang for police officer. It comes from the Algerian dialect. It means "be careful".
Hnach
Hnach (حنش) is a Tunisian slang term for police, meaning "snake" in Arabic, Also used in Morocco for inspectors since they don't work in uniforms.
Hobby Bobby
UK slang for special constables.
Heh
Derogatory denomination for the police, especially in Vienna, Austria.
Hurry up van
Slang term used on Merseyside to describe a police van.

== I ==
In the bag
NYPD slang for being a uniformed patrol officer.
Isilop
Indonesian reversed words from Polisi (police).

== J ==
Jack or Jacks
English/Australian slang term short for jackboots. The term can be used to describe a police officer, informant or an unreliable person. "To go jack on a mate" is the act of betraying associates or implicating them in a crime. A "jack" is someone who is considered not to be trusted. Also old slang for CID in Liverpool.
Jackboots
Heavily armed police in riot gear.
Jake/Jake the Snake
Slang term for the police originated in the Bronx (mildly derogatory).
Jam sandwich, or Jam Butty
UK, police traffic car, from the now largely obsolete historical colour-scheme – an overall white vehicle, with a longitudinal red, or red and yellow, stripe on each side. Still used for the metropolitan police in London. Silver cars with a red stripe down the side.
Jern
Norwegian shortening of håndjern meaning handcuffs.
Jjapsae
South Korean term for the police. Derogatory.
Johnny/Johnny Law
Sometimes used to refer to police in U.S. southern states.
Jump Out Boys
Teams of police officers, typically detectives in plainclothes, who wait in their cars to ambush a wanted suspect and take them into custody. Term derived from officers "jumping out" their cars to rush the suspect.

== K ==
Karao
Used in Kenya to refer to police; seen as derogatory. Its source is the Sheng language (mashup of English and Kiswahili).
Keuf
French, used in the plural "les keufs", as slang for the police. This word is more derogatory than "les flics", even though it means the same thing. The word is derived from the pronunciation of "flic" as "FLEE-KUH". In verlan slang, words are reversed, thus making the word "kuhflee". In turn, "lee" was dropped from the word, leaving "keuf".
Keystone
Also "Keystones" and "Keystone Cops". Used to reference any police officers who bungle an arrest or case in general, in reference to silent film comedy troupe The Keystone Cops.
Kiberer
Also "Kiwara" in Austrian German slang for a police officer, in Vienna denomination for a police detective, "Kiberei" or "Kiwarei" for the police. Slightly derogatory.
King's/Queen's Cowboys
Canadian slang term for members of the Royal Canadian Mounted Police.
Kollegen mat den Rallysträifen
Luxembourgish, literally "colleagues / fellows with the rally stripes". A reference to police officers with their police cars, which in Luxembourg have three stripes on the bonnet and on each side, representing the national colours (red, white, light blue). Because the police cars are white as well as the colour of the central stripe, it seems like they only have two stripes on it, like rally cars. It has a more or less humorous character.
Kosmonavt
Russian, referring to an OMON policeman equipped with riot gear (literally "cosmonaut").
Krasnopyoriye
Russian, slang, Краснопёрые sg Краснопёрый ("red-feathered"), outdated. Refers to the USSR police uniform of 1975–1990 having red collar insignia of rhombic shape.
Kerovi
Serbian slang for police, used to disrespect the police officers, comes from the word "ker" which in slang means dog.
Kchulim
Hebrew slang for police officers. Comes from the word "Kachol", which means blue.
Kaka
Slang for police in Maharashtra, literally means paternal uncle.
Khatmal
Slang for police in Hyderabad, India which literally means bed bugs in Indian languages.
Maatia kukura
Meaning khaki dog in English, is a derogatory word for police in Odisha due to their khaki uniforms and rowdy behaviour.
Kuka
Bulgarian slang for a police officer. The word is used derogatorily and literally means hook.

== L ==
Law, Laws, or The Law
Probably an abbreviation of the phrase "The long arm of the law" (suggesting that no matter how far they run, all criminals are eventually caught and prosecuted successfully).
Law-Dog
A derogatory word for an officer of the law, popularized by the movie Tombstone.
Legawye (pl)
Russian Легавые (sg. Легавый). Literally "gundog", "pointer". According to one of many theories, this was part of the logo of the Moscow Investigation Department in 1928, although the term existed in the 12th century.
LEOs
Law Enforcement Officers.
Lespu
Filipino back slang of "pulis".
LID
Reference to uniform officers' headwear, often used as a putdown by the CID ex. 'Those bloody lids'; attempted derogatory CE.
Local Yokel
Reference to city or town police forces, almost solely used in conjunction with "County Mountie". Mildly derogatory.
Lodówa
A Polish slang term for a police van, literally "fridge"; refers to the large size and boxy shape of police vans.
Lovens lange
Norwegian shortening of "lovens lange arm" or "long arm of the law"

== M ==
Mabando
Term used to imply the presence of law enforcement officers in a particular area. Most commonly used by the Dominican and Puerto Rican communities of Philadelphia.
Maatia kukura
Literally meaning kakhi dog, is a derogatory term for police in Odisha.
Maama
Hindi, मामा. Literally meaning maternal uncle, commonly used in Hindi to describe a male police person, typically referring to traffic police.
Mama/Mami
Marathi, slang, मामा/मामी. Literally meaning "maternal uncle/maternal aunt", it is one of the most common forms of addressing any strange male/female elder. Used frequently in Pune and Mumbai for traffic police personnel.
Madama
Italian term used when a police man is spotted on the site to advise someone during some sort of illegal action.
Madero
Slang, sometimes derogatory or vulgar. Spanish slang referring to a member of Cuerpo Nacional de Policía. The term was coined after police uniforms were changed to brown in the early 1980s.
Manayek
Derogatory. Police officer or military police in Israel.
Man, The
Derogatory. Police officer or other government agent who has control, either by force or circumstance. Widely used in the United States, especially among African Americans and prisoners. Popular during the 1960s and 1970s by anti-establishment groups.
Mata/Mata-Mata
Common slang in both Singapore and Malaysia, "mata" means "eye" in Malay and connotes surveillance, thus becoming a metonym for the police.
Meat Wagon
Common UK term for a police van, typically a Transit van, used for transporting people from a crime scene to the police station. Not commonly used for police cars or riot vans.

"John got arrested for being drunk and disorderly, the police cuffed him and threw him in the back of the Meat Wagon."
Not applicable in the United States, where the term is used to describe a coroner's van, nor in Germany, where a Mietwagen is a hired car.
Memur Bey
Common slang used in Turkey. Means "Mr. Officer".
Ment
Russian slang, Мент (pl. Менты). Only slightly disparaging, in general use (e.g. Ments is an alternative title for Streets of Broken Lights). The word comes from "Militsioner" (Милиционер).
Messingen
Norwegian, literally "The Brass", referring to police badges traditionally being made of said material.
Městapo
Czech term used for members of municipal police who are known for arrogant and harassing behaviour. Combination of the term městská policie and secret police of Nazi Germany Gestapo.
Měšťák
Czech slang for a municipal police officer. Short form of městský policista.
Millicents
Term originated from the novel A Clockwork Orange.
Militia
Slang in Romania and various post-Soviet countries with roots from the secret police.
Mr. Plod
See Plod.
MOD Plod
The Ministry of Defence Police in the United Kingdom.
Moosor
Russian, Мусор (pl. Мусора), lit. "garbage" (but countable), offensive. Etymology uncertain, theories suggested include the acronym MUS for "Moscow Criminal Investigation [Office]" (Московский Уголовный Сыск) in Tzarist Russia and Hebrew for "informer." Also, in Belarus, the acronym MUS stands for Ministry for Home Affairs (Belarusian: Міністэрства ўнутраных спраў, МУС), and is embroidered on policeman uniform.
Mountie(s)
Canada, colloquial, Royal Canadian Mounted Police. Also used in Australia to refer to the mounted police sections of the various state police forces.
Mpatsos
(Greek: μπατσος), modern slang for police officer, considered derogatory. From Ottoman Turkish baç.
Murija
Serbo-Croatian, common colloquial term for "police"; from the Italian word muro, meaning "wall".

Musker
Romany word to describe a police officer.

== N ==
Narc or Nark
1. A term used for an informant. 2. An undercover narcotics agent.
Neighbour
Partner (possible only used in Scotland with detectives).
Nick
Police station (British slang).
Nicked
To be arrested (British slang). Noddies.
New Jack
A rookie police officer; used in the New York-New Jersey-Connecticut tri-state area.

== O ==
Old Bill
Term in use in London among other areas, inspiring the television series The Bill. This nickname's origin is obscure; according to the Metropolitan Police themselves, there are at least 13 different explanations. However, the word is quite old-fashioned and is used much less nowadays, especially by younger people.
One Time
Term used in many English-speaking countries, used because one looks at the police one time, so as not to attract attention.
Onkel politi
Norwegian, literally "Uncle Police", a put-down referring to a man who traveled around Norwegian schools in the 1960s tutoring children on traffic safety.
Occifer/ossifer
Slang term used to satirically reference the title of a police officer, while implying that the speaker is intoxicated. Popularized by the 1978 Cheech & Chong film Up in Smoke. Earlier usage includes Philip K. Dick's 1970 novel Our Friends from Frolix 8.
Ōkami
Derogatory Japanese term for police. The term is a pun: the word can mean "one who is above" (大上), a term often used "in reference to the emperor, one's lord, or the authorities"; "supreme deity" (大神); or "wolf" (狼). Commonly used by the protagonist of the dorama Gokusen.
Ottowagen
(German for "Otto car") colloquial for a police car in some regions of Lower Saxony, Germany.

== P ==
Paco
A derogatory Chilean term for Carabineros, the national military police force of Chile. In Costa Rica, a familiar term for police, loosely derogatory. The term comes from the nickname "Paco" given to Francisco Calderón Guardia, a Security Minister in the 1940s.
Paddy wagon
A police van. So named in Liverpool, UK as most of the policemen and prisoners were of Irish extraction.
Panda car
UK, a police car. Named because they were originally painted with large panels of black and white, or blue (usually light blue) and white. First started by the Lancashire Constabulary in the 1960s. Original Panda cars were the same model of car bought by two adjacent forces – the one in black and the other in white. The doors were then swapped between vehicles giving all the two-tone colour scheme one way round or the other. Bonnets (hoods) could also be swapped. Unclear if boot (trunk) lids were swapped. Not all fitted with a blue beacon. Some fitted with a large box-shaped roof sign "police" with the blue beacon on top (or not). Many were Morris 1000, Austin Morris Minis or 1100s. Ford Anglias and later Escorts also used by some forces. Colour scheme later changed to blue (usually light blue) with white doors – or, again, the reverse – light blue with white doors.
Pandu
Marathi, derogatory, पांडू. Used chiefly in Mumbai. This slang for policemen, especially hawaladars, ("Havāladāra", meaning constable in Marathi) came to be from the 1975 Dada Kondke film Pandu Hawaldar.
Panduri
Serbo-Croatian, slang for a group of police officers. The meaning derived from the Latin word banderium, in which the word banderia also came from. They were military units created by Hungarian nobles in the 15th century, as well as light military border units composed of Croats, Hungarians, Romanians, and Serbs during the Ottoman Empire. Nowadays, it is used in Serbia (and parts of Bosnia, Croatia, and Montenegro) in a derogatory manner.Пандур
Panier à salade
French, lit. "salad basket", slang for a police van (cf. fourgon de police).
Parak
Slang term used for policemen in the Philippines.
Paw Patrol
Slang term for K-9 units or Dog Units in the UK.
Party Van
Russian, a police car or van, especially one housing an entire squad and sent out to perform a search-and-seizure and/or an arrest at a specific site. Hints at the party of police officers that it holds and/or the "party" it will "throw" at its destination.
Pasma
Derogatory term used in Spain to refer to the police in general. The singular form is "Pasmuti".
Peeler
Used in the UK and Ireland, however it is generally considered archaic. Derived from Sir Robert Peel (see "Bobby").
Perp
Perpetrator/criminal instigator.
Peterwagen
(German for "Peter car") colloquial for a Hamburg Police car.
Pharaoh
Russian (фараон, faraon), old-fashioned. Allegedly refers to Tsarist city policemen and passage guards standing still and emotionlessly on their posts, paying no attention to the bustling of the city around them. In older times, they were also armed with poleaxes or clubs that they were stereotypically holding like a sceptre.
Picoleto
In Spain it's a term used to refer to Guardia Civil. The term originates from "pico", meaning "spike" or "horn", referring to the tricorne worn by the members of Guardia Civil during most of its existence and still used nowadays in formal uniform.
Piedipiatti
Slang term used commonly in Italy to describe all kinds of police officers. Lit. flat feet.
Pies
Slang term used commonly in Poland to describe all kinds of police officers. 'Pies' means a dog in Polish and is understood to compare police activity to that of dogs, i.e. sniffing around etc. Highly derogatory, not used in any official circumstances.
Pig
This derogatory term was frequently used during the 19th century, disappeared for a while, but reappeared during the 20th and 21st century. It became frequently used again during the 1960s and 1970s in the underground and anti-establishment culture. The adult cartoon Fritz the Cat (1972) portrayed the police as anthropomorphic pigs, adding to the popularity of the term. It is now prevalent in many English-speaking countries. It is also used in anti-authority punk, goth, metalhead, biker, mobster and hip-hop circles. Oz magazine showed a picture of a pig dressed as a policeman on a front cover and the term inspired "pig cops" in the video game Duke Nukem 3D.
Pig Pen
Cop shop, i.e., police station.
Pinched
To be arrested (American slang).
Pikachu
In Vietnam, this word refers to traffic police, who wear yellow suits and therefore resemble the Pokémon Pikachu.
Piolín
Derogatory term used in Spain to refer to a member of Cuerpo Nacional de Policía, named after Tweety (in Spanish Piolín). The term was coined after the arrival of the National Police in Barcelona on a ferry decorated with Looney Tunes characters. The term was also used in the Spanish congress by the Spanish prime minister Pedro Sánchez.
Pitufo
Slang, sometimes derogatory or vulgar, literally meaning "Smurf". Spanish slang referring to a member of Cuerpo Nacional de Policía. Originated in the 1980s when police uniforms were changed from brown to blue in 1986.
Plastic Policeman
UK slang term for Police Community Support Officers.
Placa
Mexican slang for police officer.
Plod, PC Plod or Plodder
Slang, UK and Australia. An allusion to Mr. Plod the Policeman in Enid Blyton's Noddy stories for children, to plod meaning to walk doggedly and slowly with heavy steps.
Plot
To Plot up, Abbreviation of the term 'Park up and Look Out for Target'.
Polda
Czech slang for police officer. Originated as short of word "policista" – Czech term for policeman.
Po-lé
Indonesian term for Indonesian Police, popular amongst young students and streetboys in Jakarta and used to warn their friends during illegal streetrace or under-age riding.
Polente
Slang for the police in German, slightly derogatory.
Poli, polis (plural)
Spanish slang for police (abbreviation of policía).
Polis
The Scots language word for police (not to be confused with the exaggerated US pronunciation 'po-leece') also frequently used in English as spoken North of the Border, It was once common in Ireland but is rarely heard today except in a jocular sense.
Polyp, polypen (plural)
Slang for police officers in Germany.
Ponda
Slang for policemen in Kashmir region of Jammu & Kashmir, India. It is said to have derived from the British Pound sterling, insinuating that the police are susceptible to bribery.
Pony Soldier
Royal Canadian Mounted Police.
Porkchop
Variation on Pig.
Po-po, Popo, Popos, PoPo
A derogatory street term for police. Originally from Southern California, where bicycle police, beginning in the 1980s, wore T-shirts marked 'PO', for 'police officer', in block letters. As these officers rode in pairs, their shirts would read 'POPO' when side by side. Yelled out by children to warn a neighborhood that police are in the area. term is used in the UK
Poulet
French derogatory slang for police (literally "chicken"), similar to American English "pig".
Pretty Police
Obsolete term used to describe officers deployed in men's toilets to lure homosexual men into a honey trap (source Call the Midwife).
Probinsyano
Another slang term used for policemen in the Philippines due to the famous TV show Ang Probinsyano.
Puerco
Hispanic derogatory slang for police (literally "pig").
Purken
Norwegian slang for the police (literally "the sow").

== Q ==
Queen's/King's Cowboys
Canadian slang term for members of the Royal Canadian Mounted Police.

== R ==
Rati
Argentinean slang term for police officers derived from "rata" (rat). Also derived from vesre pronunciation of tira ("strap"), since older police uniforms featured a leather strap across the officer's chest. See Tira.
Also used in Chile as slang for a member of the PDI.
Reggin
Slang used for non-white police officers in Latvia.
Rent-a-Cop
Not actually used to refer to police officers, but instead a derogatory term applied to any privately hired security guard not acting as a bouncer or bodyguard.
Road Pirates
US, slang for law enforcement who perform traffic enforcement such as writing citations for speeding and reckless driving.
Rollers
US, Black slang for police officers widely used on the East and West Coasts in the early 1970s.
Roussin
French. In the 18th century undercover detectives in high society were dressed in a reddish (roussâtre) long jacket.
Rozzers
UK, slang for police officers, first recorded in the late 1800s.

== S ==
Sanki
A Polish term for detention, literally "sleigh", comes from "sankcje" – sanctions.
Sbirro
Italian slang term for a police officer.
Schmier
Derogatory slang term for policeman in Switzerland. Literally German for 'dirt'/'smear'/'grease', derived from 'schmiergeld' or 'schmieren' – 'bribe money' and 'to bribe' respectively. Referring to police as a whole as a totally corrupt organization. Plural forms: (schmiere[n]) for male and (schmierin) for feminine.
Scuffer
Term used in Liverpool for a policeman.
Scum
Commonly used in the U.K. Very similar in use to "The Filth"
"The Scum are raiding John's house. The Filth are never done harassing him!"
Shades
Term used to refer to members of the An Garda Síochána. Derived from Traveller Cant, it is said to refer either to the two shades of blue on the Garda uniform, or to the practice of wearing peaked uniform caps, casting a "shade" over their eyes. It is also perhaps thought to refer to the sunglasses (or shades) they once commonly wore.
Shickalon[e]y
Garda Síochána. Based on a mispronunciation of Síochána.
Shopping Center
Brazilian police slang for good intelligence work.
Shtar
French slang for police. It is also used when referring to a pimple.
Silovik
(силовик, pl. siloviki, силовики), colloquial Russian term for members of various law enforcement agencies (the police, FSB etc.) Derived from сила/sila "strength, force", as in "police force".
Six-up
Slang term for police originating in San Francisco, California in the mid- to late-1970s; used primarily by Grateful Dead followers, so use of the term seems to be dying out.
Smeris
Dutch slang for police.
Slaboviki
Uncommon Russian slang for all special services (police, FSB, etc.). Derived from слабый/slabyy, "weak". Contrary to usual slang "siloviki", highlighting that they only can arrest single unarmed opposition members with a whole van of masked and armed operatives instead of fighting organized crime and corruption.
Slops
"Back-slang" formation from "police" spelled backwards, "ecilop" = "slop" or "slob". Common before World War II in the UK. Slobs can by found in dialogue from 1915 onwards in the books of P G Wodehouse. Rare today.

Smokey
State police or troopers. Derived from over-the-road trucker CB radio calls, as popularized by the 1977 film Smokey and the Bandit. Though the portrayal of police in that movie was generally negative, the term itself is not always derogatory.
Snut
Norwegian/Swedish slang widely used for cops.
Spinaderer
Austrian policemen named for their dark green uniforms, alluding to Spinat (spinach).
Stater/Statie
A state trooper, as opposed to a local county or federal police officer of the US.
Stormtrooper(s)
Mainly used to refer to riot police but can be used to refer to any group of police, referencing their paramilitary gear and blank uniform appearance alluding to both the German Stormtroopers of the World Wars (suggesting inherent authoritarian leanings) and the Imperial Stormtroopers of the Star Wars films (drawing connotations with being faceless henchmen).
Suka
Polish for "bitch", both in the sense of 'female dog' and as an offensive term, refers to a police van. Possibly a play on "pies". Also a dated Russian term for a prison inmate collaborating with the authorities, with the same meaning in general use.
Svartemarja
Norwegian (originally from English) referring to historic black police cars used to take people to jail.
Švestky
Referred to police officers in Czech slang (plural of the fruit plum).
Sweeney, The
UK slang term for the Flying Squad of London's Metropolitan Police Service. From Cockney rhyming slang: "Sweeney Todd" = "Flying Squad". Popularised by British 1970s television police drama series The Sweeney.

== T ==
The Thin Blue Line
The role of the police as the barrier between civilized society and chaos, inspiring a UK sitcom and two documentaries of the same name.
Three Letter Agency
Used in the United States to denote the multiple federal agencies that are commonly referred to by their initials such as the FBI, ATF, and DEA.
Thulla
ठुल्ला. A North Indian slang for policemen. One theory is that it is derived from "thulla", a name used in Eastern India for the jute gunny sack, which resembles the khaki uniforms worn by many police forces in the country.
Tholo
Slang used for police in Gujarat.
Tiao-zi
条子. A derogatory Chinese slang referring to police, originated from Hong Kong or Taiwan.
Tira
A Brazilian Portuguese slang word (colloquial) for police officers, its origin comes from tira [ˈtʃiɾa], since older police uniforms had a strap across the chest. It is also commonly used in Mexican Spanish with the same meaning.
Toniwagen
(German for "Toni car") historical denomination for a Volkspolizei car in East Berlin, East Germany.
Tombo
A Peruvian, Colombian and other South American countries' slang term, comes from switching the syllables of "Botón", which means button, an allusion to the ribbons or medals that police officers used to wear on their uniforms.
Town Clown
Town or city police officers, contrasted with county or state police. Usually considered derogatory.:
Trooper
A term used to describe American state police forces, law enforcements officers who have jurisdictional powers across an entire state. These departments are normally subdivided into "troops" across the state as opposed to precincts for local officers or counties for sheriffs offices. As a result, Trooper has become a rank in of itself in many of these departments, though the public will refer to any state police officer as a trooper regardless of their rank.
Twelve / "12"
"12" is a slang name whose popularity is currently (as of 2019) on the rise. This name is used mostly by criminals or people to warn those indulging in crime or illegal activity that police officers are on their way. Although the term 12 is a police radio call code, urban slang has changed it into a warning phrase. Possible etymologies include 1312, the numeric representation of the acronym "ACAB" which stands for "all cops are bastards", as well as an account of the phrase deriving from the 1970s television show Adam-12.
Twig Pig
US slang referring to United States Forest Service Law Enforcement, or state agency equivalents.
Triads
黑社會. A derogatory slang given by pro-democracy supporters, during the 2019–20 Hong Kong protests, to refer to Hong Kong Police Force after their failure in protecting train passengers from attacks by allegedly gang members and their alleged collusion during the attack at a train station in Yuen Long.
Tyttebærpoliti
Norwegian, literally "Lingonberry Police" (from the Securitas logo), referring to any privately hired security guard, excluding bouncers and bodyguards. Occasional plan B for Police Academy rejects.
Txakurra
Basque word meaning dog. Slang for a police officer, especially a member of Spanish Nacional Police.

== V ==
Verme
Brazilian derogatory term for a police officer (literally meaning: Vermin), usually referring to a member of the Polícia Militar (PM)
Vics
US slang term for the police in the 1990s and 2000s, referring to the Ford Crown Victoria, a car model commonly used by police departments.
Slang term used in Victoria, Australia for the Victoria Police.
Also used by the police to refer to crime victims in the US.
Vito
Slang used in Algeria for patrol police units, a reference to Mercedes-Benz Vito van often used by the Algerian Police.

== W ==
Wachtelsepp
"Waving Sepp" ('wachtel' lit. quail, but colloquially used for waving; 'Sepp' is the diminutive form for Joseph). Austrian German slang term for a cardboard cutout police officer usually set up to deter speeding. Dubbed "Kollege Vinzenz" by the Austrian police force.
Walloper
Australian slang for a police officer. Commonly used in the 19th to 20th centuries for the policeman on the beat, carrying a truncheon.
Wankers Association
Scottish term for the police overall, coined by Frank Anthony, and further made popular by Peter Anderson.
Wanne
German for "tub", local denomination of Berlin Police personnel carriers equipped with mesh window shields.
Water Rat
Derogatory Australian slang for Water Police. Water Rats was a long-running TV police procedural based on the Sydney Water Police.
Weiße Maus
German for "white mouse", for their white uniforms and peaked caps that are generally not in use except for special events. In Germany: colloquial denomination of traffic police units of the state police forces and in Austria: colloquial denomination of motorbikes police units in general, although white uniforms and motorbikes are no longer in use.
Whiter-than-White, The
Derisive term for a police force predominantly full of racist white officers; British-English in origin.
Woodentop
Uniformed police officer. Derisory term used by British plain-clothes detectives.
Woody
A plastic police officer. Derisive term used for British police.
Wout
Dutch slang for police, meaning authority.

== Y ==
Yuta
Derogatory term for police used in Argentina, Uruguay and some parts of Chile. Most probably a contraction of "Yusta" borrowed from Italian "giusta" Lunfardo: conocé de dónde vienen muchas de las palabras que usamos a diario (meaning 'she who imparts justice'), keeping in mind the widespread influence of that language in the Lunfardo slang. Also possibly a corruption of yunta (yoke) since they usually ride in pairs.

== Z ==
Zausj
Derivatory of bausj, changed for discretion on the streets

Zipaio
Slang used in the Basque Country (mainly by nationalist, left radicals) against members of the Basque Autonomic Police.
