= Kaka =

Kaka may refer to:

== People ==
=== Nickname or given name ===
==== Sports ====
- Kaká (born 1982), Brazilian football attacking midfielder Ricardo Izecson dos Santos Leite
- Kaká (futsal player) (born 1987), Italian futsal pivot Carlos Augusto dos Santos da Silva
- Kaká (footballer, born 1981), Brazilian football centre-back Claudiano Bezerra da Silva
- Kaká (footballer, born May 1991), Brazilian football attacking midfielder Everton Ferreira Guimarães
- Káká (Portuguese footballer) (born 1992), Portuguese football left-back Carlos Eduardo Ferreira Batista
- Kaká (footballer, born 1999), Brazilian football center-back Andressa Karolaine Freire Gomes
- Kaká (footballer, born 2004), Brazilian football centre-back Brno Kauan Carneiro Da Silva

==== Others ====
- Kaka Bag-ao (born 1969), Filipino human rights lawyer, agrarian reform advocate and politician
- Joseph Baptista (1864–1930), Indian politician from Mumbai
- Kaka Kalelkar (1895-1981), Indian independence activist, social reformer and journalist
- Rajesh Khanna (1942–2012), Bollywood actor, film producer and politician
- Randeep Singh Nabha, Indian politician
- Kaka Radhakrishnan (c. 1925–2012), Indian film actor
- Joginder Singh (politician) (1918–1998), Punjabi politician
- Kaká Werá (born 1964), Brazilian writer and politician
- Kaka Mallam Yale (born 1953), Nigerian politician
- Mahamat Déby (born 1984), Chadian politician

=== Pen name or stage name ===
- Kaka (Danish singer) (born 1991), Danish reggae, dancehall singer of Tanzanian origin
- Kaka Hathrasi, pen name of Hindi satirist Prabhu Lal Garg (1906–1995)
- Shrinivas Khale (1926–2011), Indian composer and music director also known as Khale Kaka
- Kaka Sungura, stage name of Kenyan rapper Kevin Onimba (born 1987)

=== Surname ===
- Gillies Kaka (born 1990), New Zealand rugby union player
- Moussa Kaka, Nigerien radio journalist
- Sefiu Adegbenga Kaka (born 1952), Nigerian politician

== Places ==
- Kaka, Central African Republic, a village
- Kaka, Golestan, a village in Golestan Province, Iran
- Kaka, Zanjan, a village in Zanjan Province, Iran
- Sofara (Kaka in the Fula language), a town in Mali
- Kaka, Togo, a village
- Kaka District, Turkmenistan
  - Kaka, Turkmenistan, a town and district capital
- Kaka, Arizona, United States, a census-designated place
- Kaka River, Bolivia
- Kaka Nunatak, a nunatak on Ross Island, Antarctica

== Animals ==
- Kākā, a native New Zealand parrot
- Norfolk kākā, an extinct parrot
- Chatham kākā, an extinct parrot

== Other uses ==
- KAKA (FM), a radio station licensed to serve Salina, Kansas, United States
- KXSA-FM, a radio station licensed to serve Dermott, Arkansas, United States, which held the call sign KAKA-FM from 1984 to 1986; see List of radio stations in Arkansas
- KAKA (AM), a defunct radio station in Wickenburg, Arizona; see List of radio stations in Arizona
- Kaka, a dialect of the Manenguba language of Cameroon
- Kaka (film), a 2021 Philippine erotic comedy film
- Kaka Babu, a fictional Indian detective

== See also ==
- Kaka Point, a small settlement in New Zealand
- Caca (disambiguation)
- Kaki (disambiguation)
