= Chinese fig =

Chinese fig may refer to:

- Ficus microcarpa, a species in the fig genus, Ficus
- Diospyros kaki, the Asian persimmon, with dried fruits sometimes referred to as "Chinese figs"
