= The Tiger and the Dried Persimmon =

Korean folktale

The Tiger and the Dried Persimmon (Korean: 호랑이와 곶감) is a Korean folktale about a foolish tiger that has the fear of dried persimmon, also known as "gotgam", misjudging it as a being that is scarier than itself.

== Plot ==
The tiger overhears the conversation of a mother with a crying baby, and after hearing consistent crying of the baby despite the mention of tigers coming to get the baby, the tiger misunderstands it as babies not fearing tigers. However, the crying of the baby is stopped by mention of the dried persimmon, which makes the tiger think of the fruit snack as a being scarier than the tiger. In the same house, a cow thief sneaks into the house and rides the tiger. The tiger, thinking the thief was the dried persimmon, runs for its life, and when the thief realizes that he rode a tiger he flees.

== Adaptation ==
Korean children's writer Ma Hae-song wrote a children's story based on the story called "The Tiger and the Dried Persimmon (호랑이와 곶감)" in 1933.

Korean singers Young Tak and Chee Kwang-min performed a song written by Chee Kwang-min based on the story called "GOAT GAMIDA" (Korean: 곶감이다, meaning "It's Dried Persimmon") for EBS's K-Story Pop Contest in 2014 and released a re-arrangement in 2022. On March 23, 2023, an animation video of the song was introduced with the intention of "planning to actively use it for children's educational content, with lyrics and addictive choruses that realistically express traditional fairy tales".
