= Dried persimmon =

Traditional dried fruit

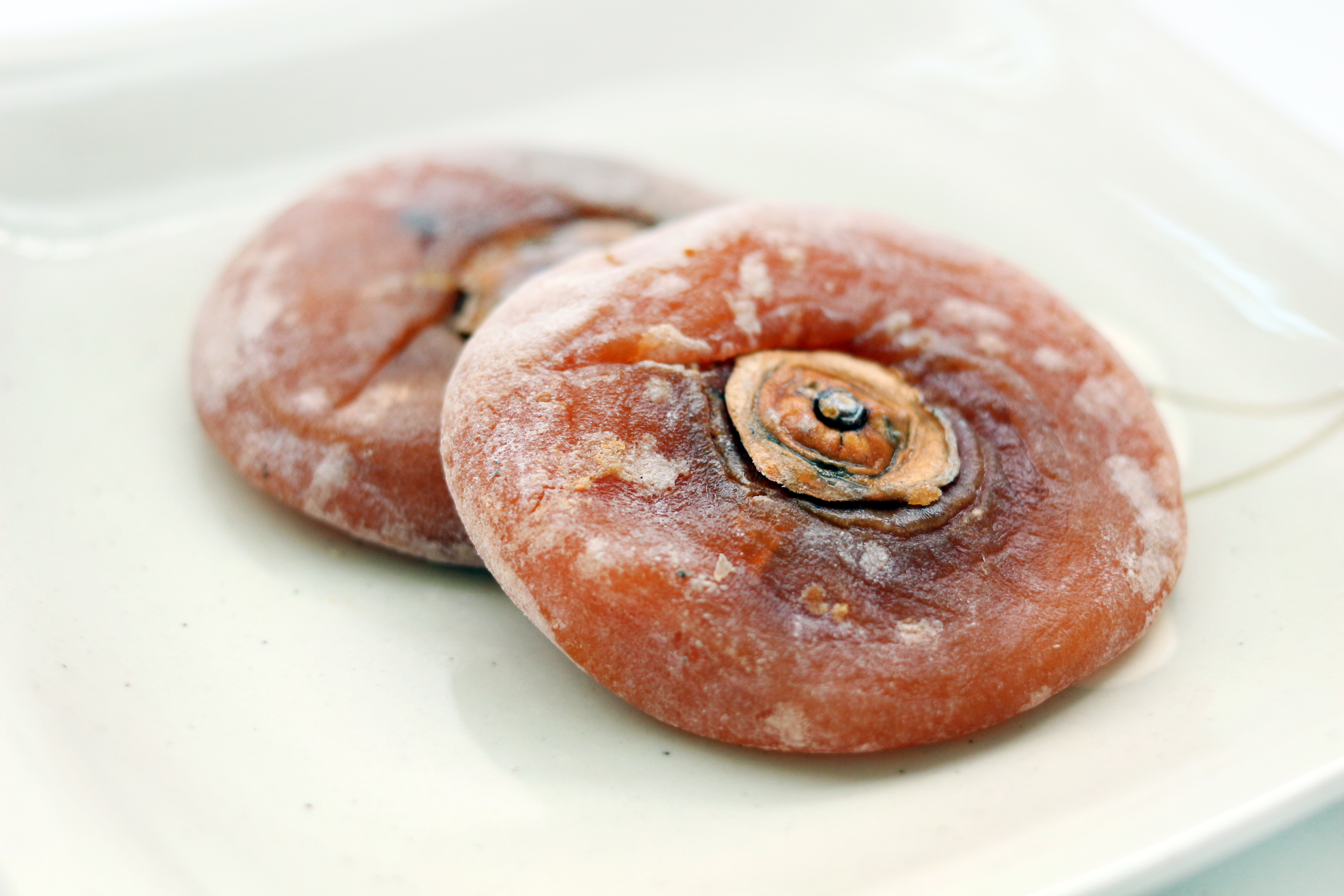
- Dried persimmons
- Alternative names: Dried persimmon
- Type: Dried fruit
- Region or state: East Asia
- Main ingredients: Oriental persimmon

Dried persimmon is a type of traditional dried fruit snack in East Asia with origins in China. They dried them to use them in other seasons. Known as shìbǐng (柿餅) in Chinese, hoshigaki (干し柿) in Japanese, gotgam (곶감) in Korean, and hồng khô in Vietnamese, it is traditionally made in the winter, by air drying Oriental persimmon. It is also used to make wine, put in traditional tea, and in creating other desserts.

In the Han dynasty, Yangshao dried persimmon was used as a tribute to the imperial court.

== Production ==
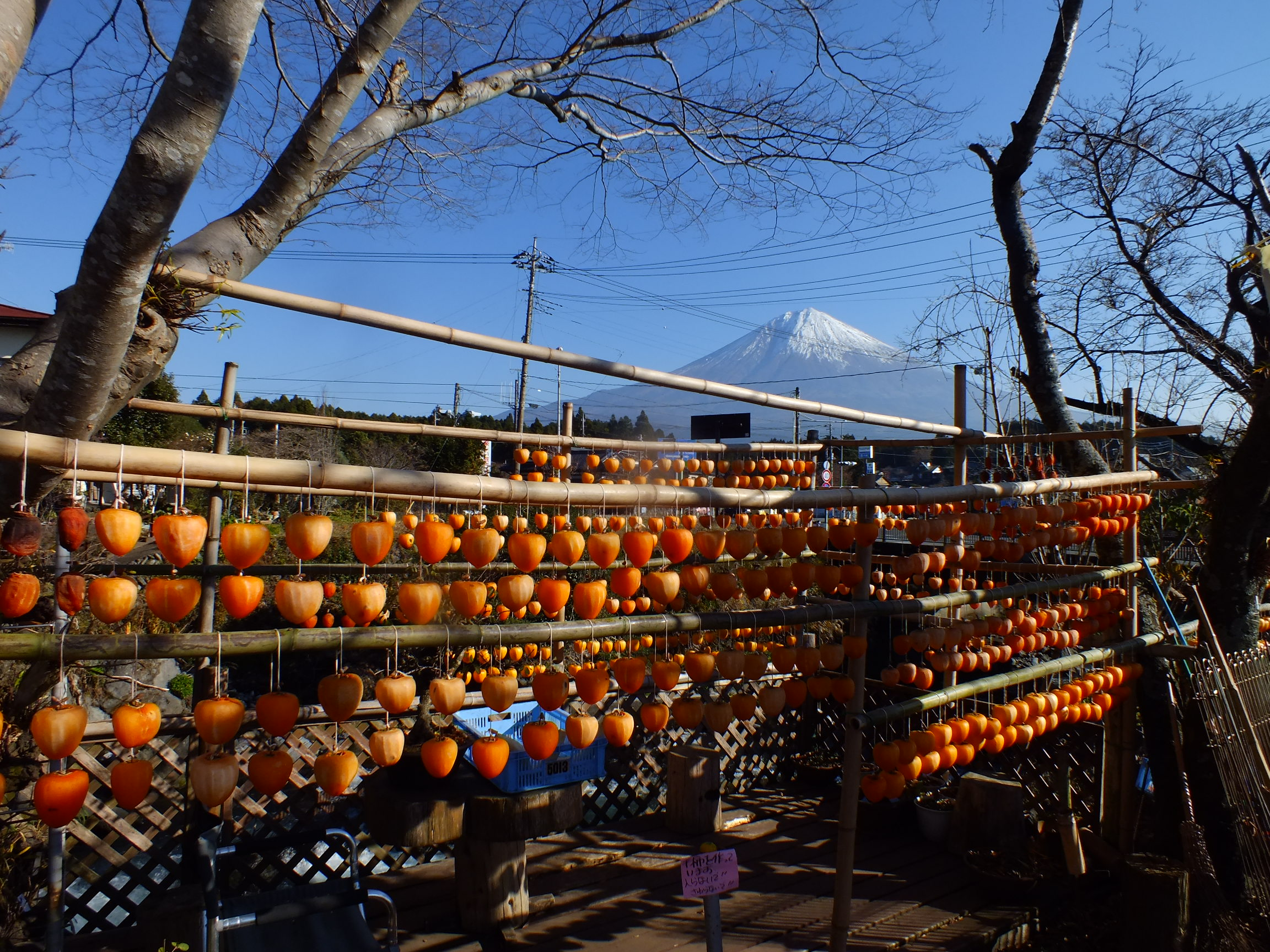
Persimmon-drying with Mount Fuji in Fujinomiya, Shizuoka, Japan

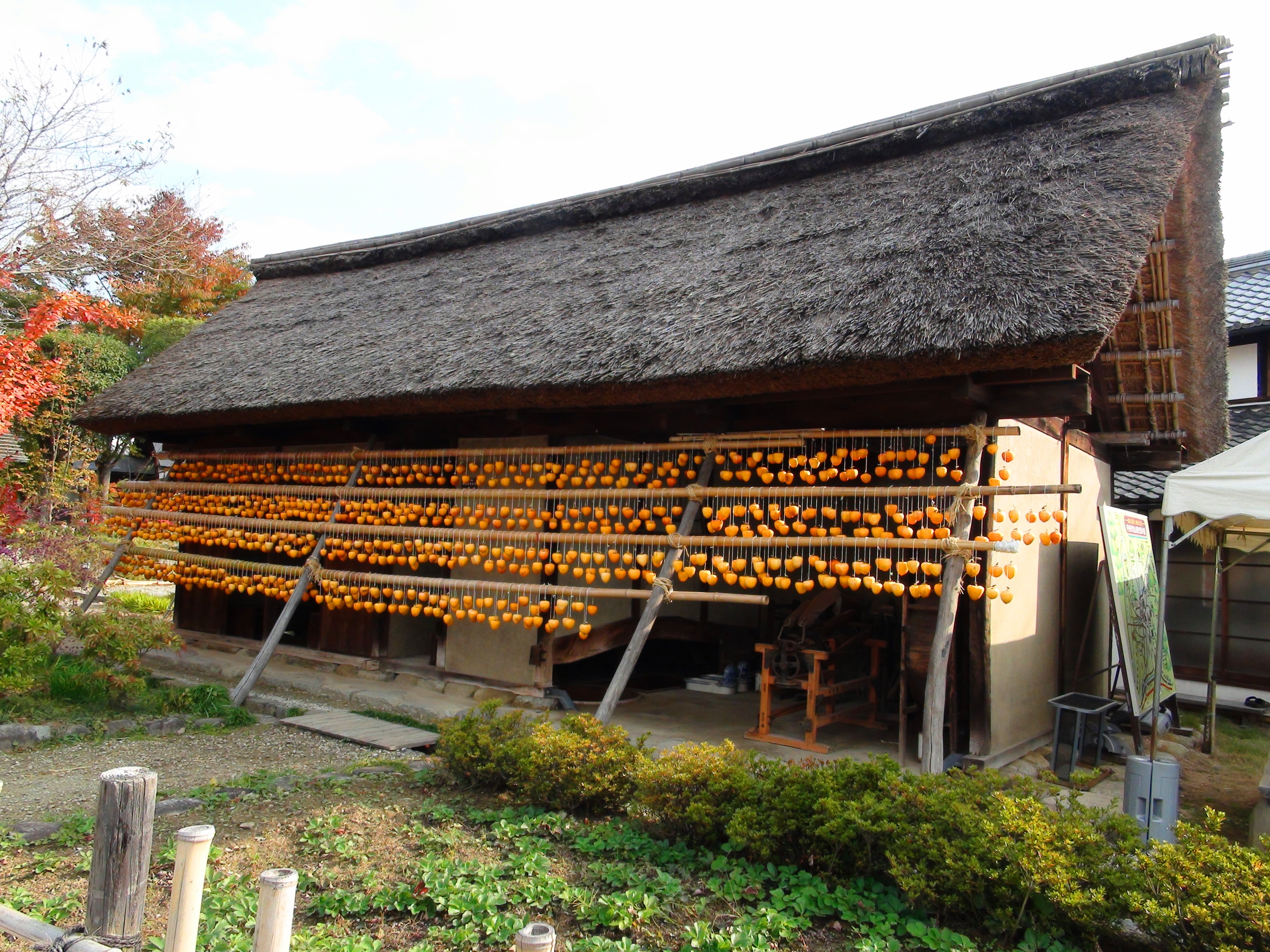
Persimmons, strung up by their stems, being air dried in Kōshū, Japan.

Dried persimmon are made from various varieties of Oriental persimmon. Persimmons, when fully ripe, are thin-skinned, soft and sweet. Persimmons used to create dried persimmons are harvested when they are under-ripe, firm, astringent, and bitter.

=== China ===
In China, there are many different varieties of dried persimmon. The traditional way of drying persimmon is to choose fruits which are fully mature. After the persimmons are peeled and blemishes have been removed, a drying rack 0.8-1m high and covered with foil is placed in an area with sufficient light, air circulation, and sanitation. The persimmons are then placed stem-side up onto the rack and covered to prevent contact from rain or other environmental debris. The drying process causes the flesh to shrivel and a frosty layer to form on the surface. In addition, there are artificial drying methods, this method producing brighter-coloured persimmons. Each region in China has different production methods and dried fruit characteristics, of which Xi'an dried persimmon is more famous.

=== Japan ===
In Japan, the fruit are peeled and then suspended by strings from their stems. They are massaged daily after they have started to dry. This gives the dried persimmon from Japan a distinctive shape and texture that is different from those from China and Korea. Anpo-gaki is a variation of Japanese dried persimmon in which the persimmon is dried by fumigating with sulphur, resulting in a soft, juicy texture.

=== Korea ===
In Korea, the persimmons are peeled and dried, tied with saekki (rice straw ropes) and hung in sunny, well-ventilated place, for example to the eaves of the house. When the color turns brown and the outer part hardens, the seeds are removed and the persimmons are sealed again and flattened. After around three weeks, when the fruits reach 75% of their original weight, they are covered in dried rice straw and stored in a box in a cool place until the drying process is completed, and a white powdery crust of persimmon sugar forms on the outside. Sangju in North Gyeongsang Province is famous for its dried persimmons.

== Nutrition ==
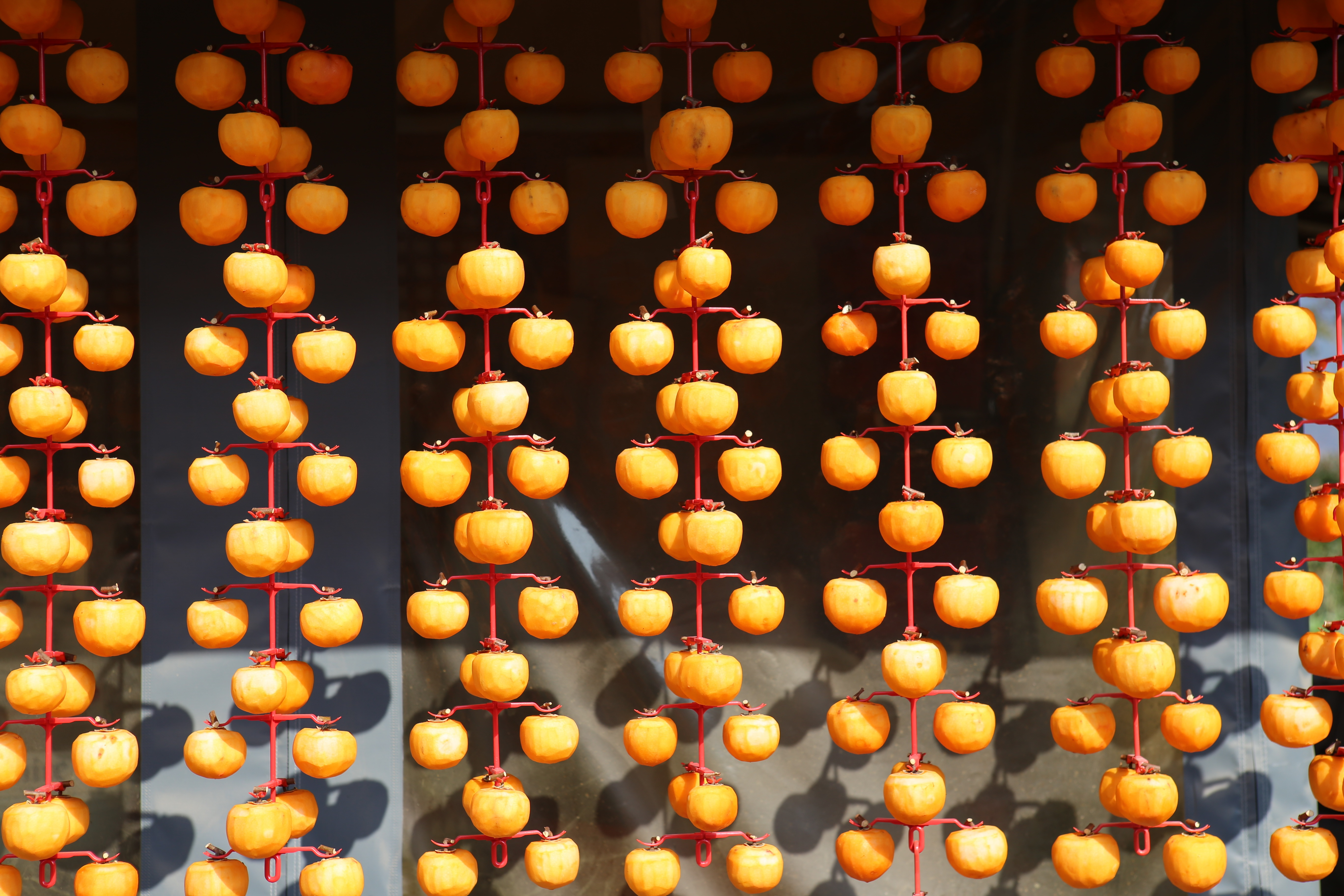
Modern persimmon-drying rack used instead of traditional straw ropes, in Hahoe Folk Village, Korea

Korean gotgam usually consists of 32% moisture, 6.3% protein, 0.44% fat, 44.8% carbohydrate, 15% fiber, and 1.99% ash. calories (32g/ea) : 75.8kcal

== Culinary use ==
In Chinese cuisine, dried persimmons can be directly consumed or used as an ingredient in other foods. For example, dried persimmon wrap is made by wrapping a walnut with dried persimmon. Dried persimmon is also served with pine nuts or fresh fruits.

In Japan, hoshigaki are eaten by themselves as a quick snack or eaten with walnuts and/or with traditional desserts like dango, mochi, or raindrop cake.

== In popular culture ==
According to Chinese legend, Zhu Yuanzhang was forced to live in exile at the foot of Jinweng mountain in the north of Fuping. He was able to live because he ate local dried persimmons.

The Korean folktale "The Tiger and the Dried Persimmon" features a tiger scared of dried persimmon.

== Gallery ==
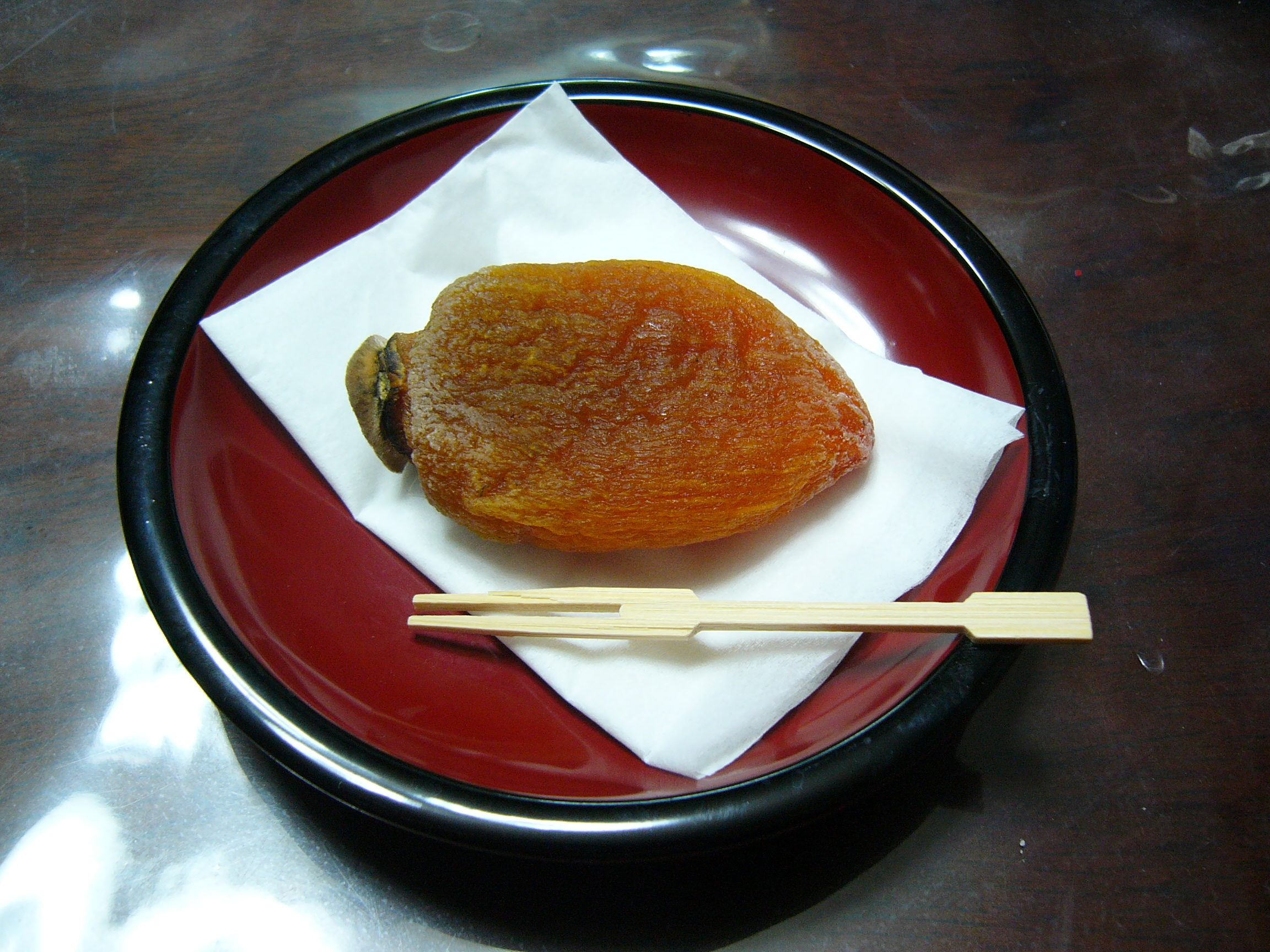
Hoshigaki served as a snack in Japan

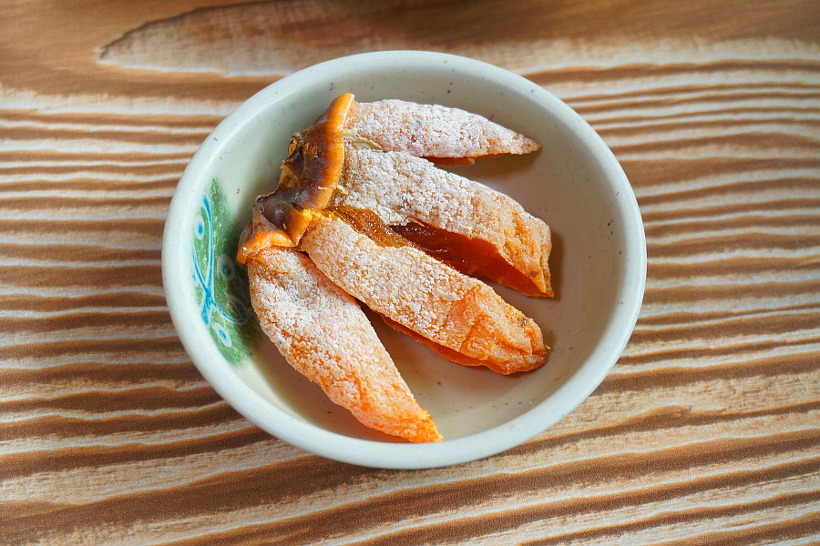
Sliced gotgam served as a snack in Korea

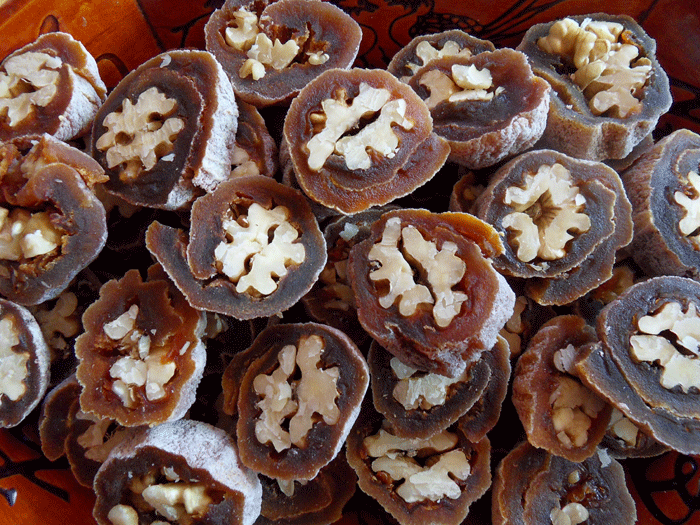
Gotgam-ssam (dried persimmon rolls) made with walnuts

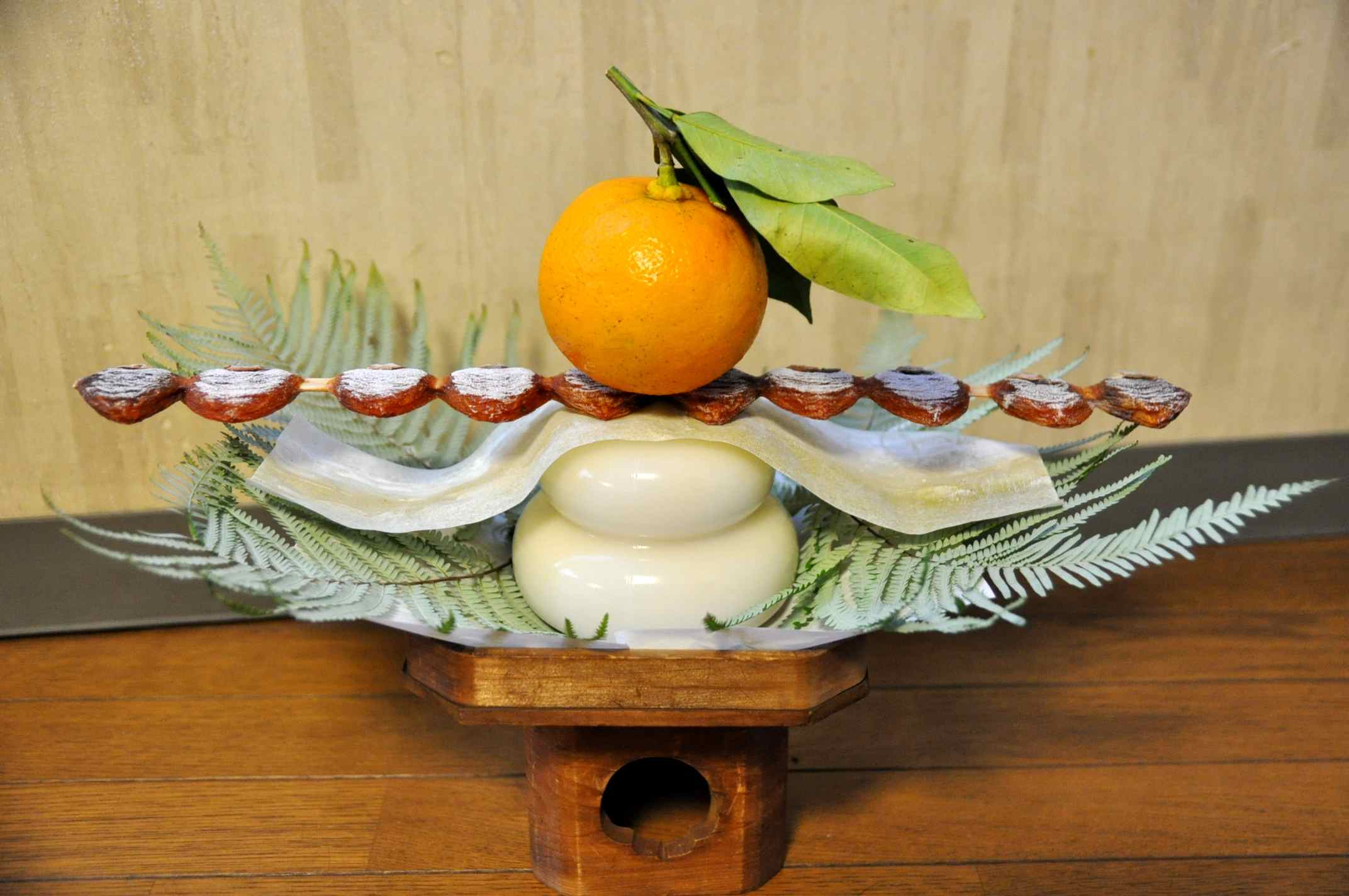
Japanese kagami mochi served with dried persimmon-skewers

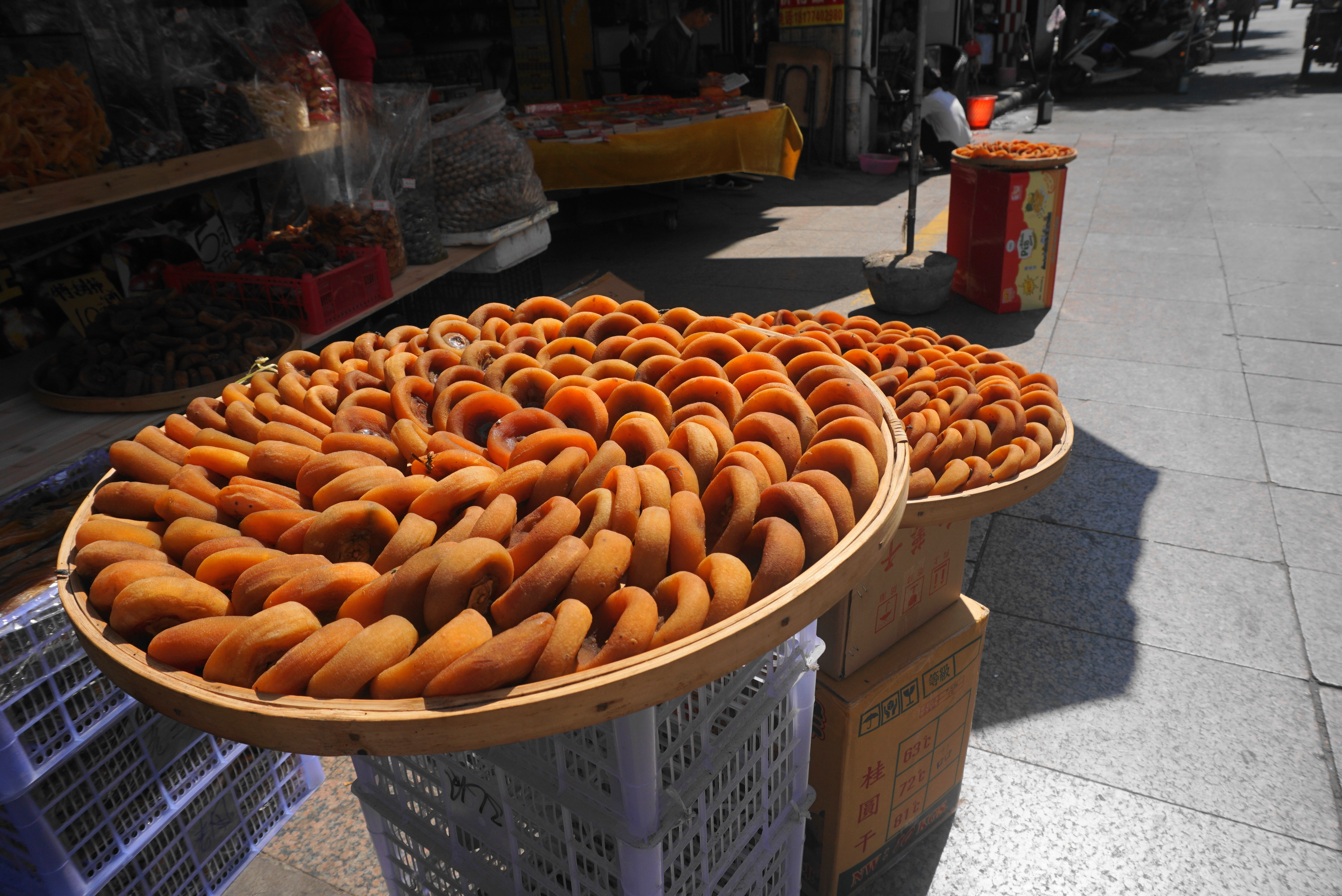
Shibing of roadside sales in China.

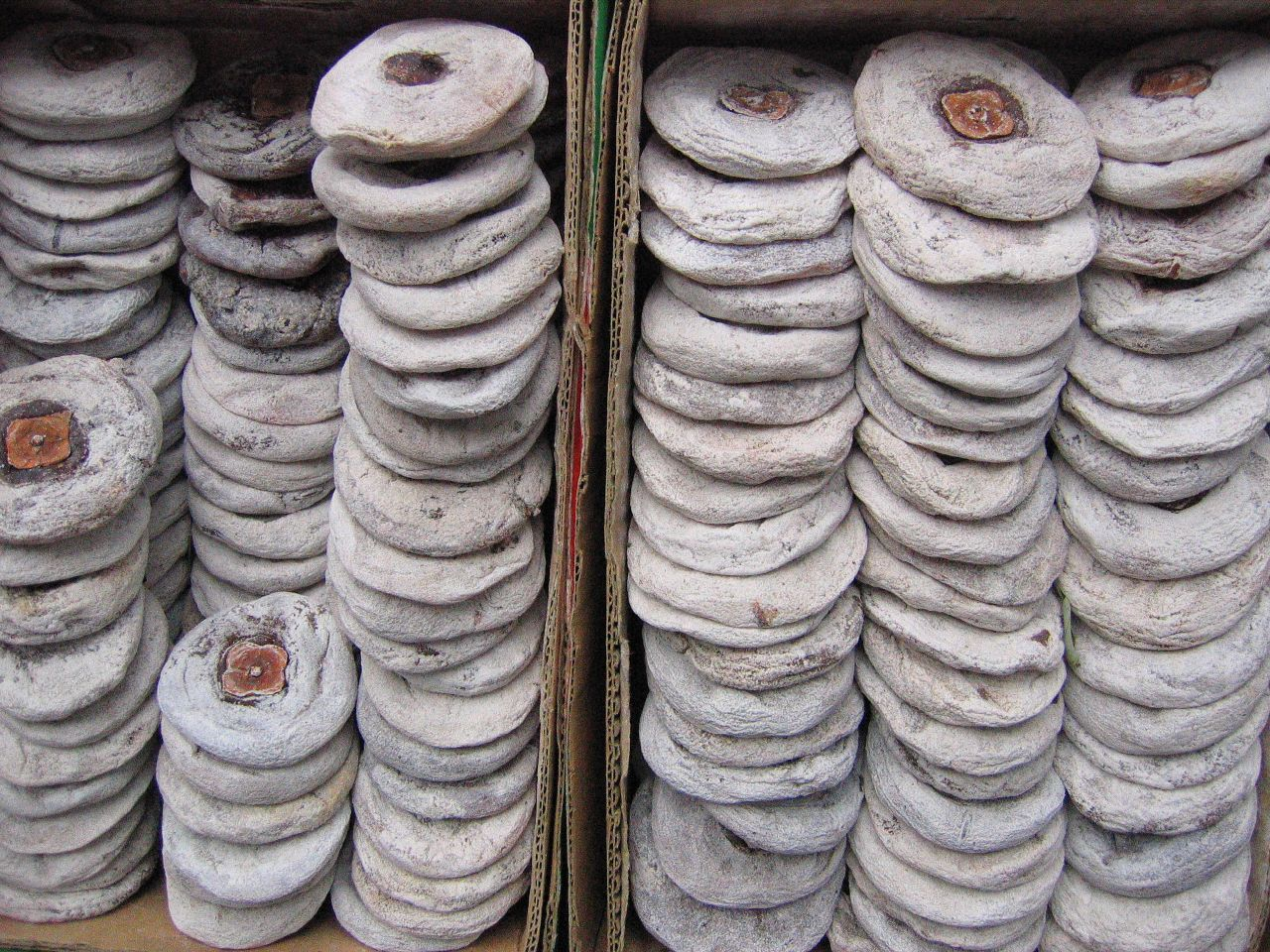
Different varieties of dried persimmon in China

== See also ==
- Dried apricot
- Dried cherry
- Dried cranberry
- List of dried foods
