= Caca =

Caca or CACA may refer to:

- Caca (mythology), a Roman goddess
- Caca, slang for feces
- Cacá (footballer, born 1999), nickname of Brazilian footballer Carlos de Menezes Júnior
- Cacá (footballer, born 1982), nickname of Brazilian footballer Lucas de Deus Santos
- Cacá (footballer, born 1979), nickname of Brazilian footballer Carlos Eduardo Ferrari
- Chinese American Citizens Alliance
- China Anti-Cult Association
- (Z)-4-Amino-2-butenoic acid or CACA, a selective GABA_{C} agonist

== See also ==
- Caca Bonita, a 1995 album by Papa Roach
- Cacāre, Latin for "to defecate" and the root of the slang term "caca"
- Kaka (disambiguation)
- libcaca, a software library that converts pixel information into colored ASCII art
