= Khaki-ye Olya =

Khaki-ye Olya (Persian: خاكي عليا) may refer to:

- Khaki-ye Olya, Kerman
- Khaki-ye Olya, Lorestan
