= Khakee =

Khakee may refer to:

- Khaki, a color used in military uniforms
- Khakee (film), a 2004 Indian action thriller film
- Khakee: The Bihar Chapter, a 2022 Indian crime thriller series
  - Khakee: The Bengal Chapter, a 2025 Indian crime thriller series, sequel of the 2022 series

== See also ==
- Khaki (disambiguation)
