= Khaki-ye Olya, Kerman =

Khaki-ye Olya خاكي عليا
- Village
- Location within Iran
- Coordinates: 29°37′50″N 56°22′57″E
- Country: Iran
- Province: Kerman
- County: Sirjan
- Bakhsh: Central
- Rural District: Chahar Gonbad

Population (2006)
  - Total: 21
- Time zone: UTC+3:30 (IRST)
  - Summer (DST): UTC+4:30 (IRDT)

Khaki-ye Olya (Persian: خاكي عليا, also Romanized as Khākī-ye ‘Olyā; also known as Khākī) is a village in Chahar Gonbad Rural District, in the Central District of Sirjan County, Kerman Province, Iran. At the 2006 census, its population was 21, in 7 families.
