= Khaki-ye Olya, Lorestan =

Khaki-ye Olya خاكي عليا
- Village
- Location within Iran
- Coordinates: 34°11′18″N 47°38′11″E
- Country: Iran
- Province: Lorestan
- County: Delfan
- Bakhsh: Kakavand
- Rural District: Kakavand-e Gharbi

Population (2006)
  - Total: 52
- Time zone: UTC+3:30 (IRST)
  - Summer (DST): UTC+4:30 (IRDT)

Khaki-ye Olya (Persian: خاكي عليا, also Romanized as Khākī-ye ‘Olyā; also known as Khākī-ye Bālā) is a village in Kakavand-e Gharbi Rural District, Kakavand District, Delfan County, Lorestan Province, Iran. At the 2006 census, its population was 52, in 8 families.
