= Kakki Nau =

Coordinates: 30°46′N 72°2′E

Kakki Nau is a village in Shorkot Tehsil, Jhang District, Punjab, Pakistan, it lies 7 km southwest of the city of Shorkot. The village has two primary schools and a boys' government high school and a higher secondary school for girls, basic medical care is available.

== History ==
The village has archaeological sites dating back 2000 years, the district is associated with Alexander the Great's invasion and the area has ancient relics of the past.

== Society ==
The greatest number of residents are of the Sheikh, Khokhar, Joiya, Rajput of the Rana caste and Kathia sub-castes. Other castes include the Arraien, Sappal, Diplana Sial, Mochi and Malik. The population is mostly Muslim, both Shi'a and Sunni, with an Ahmadi minority. The main languages are Punjabi which is the vernacular tongue in everyday use and Urdu which is used in education.

Many villagers own small businesses, and shops, or work for the government.

The town is conservative socially; men wear traditional clothes, such as the shalwar kameez, as well as turbans and dhotis. Kakki Nau hosts a religious festival, Mella Jattipeer, each summer; traditional games and entertainment are part of the festivities.
