= Kaki, Hormozgan =

Kaki ككي
- Village
- Location within Iran
- Coordinates: 25°42′48″N 58°12′48″E
- Country: Iran
- Province: Hormozgan
- County: Jask
- Bakhsh: Central
- Rural District: Gabrik

Population (2006)
  - Total: 234
- Time zone: UTC+3:30 (IRST)
  - Summer (DST): UTC+4:30 (IRDT)

Kaki (Persian: ككي, also Romanized as Kakī) is a village in Gabrik Rural District, in the Central District of Jask County, Hormozgan Province, Iran. At the 2006 census, its population was 234, in 54 families.
