= Kaka (Danish singer) =

Danish dancehall and hip hop artist

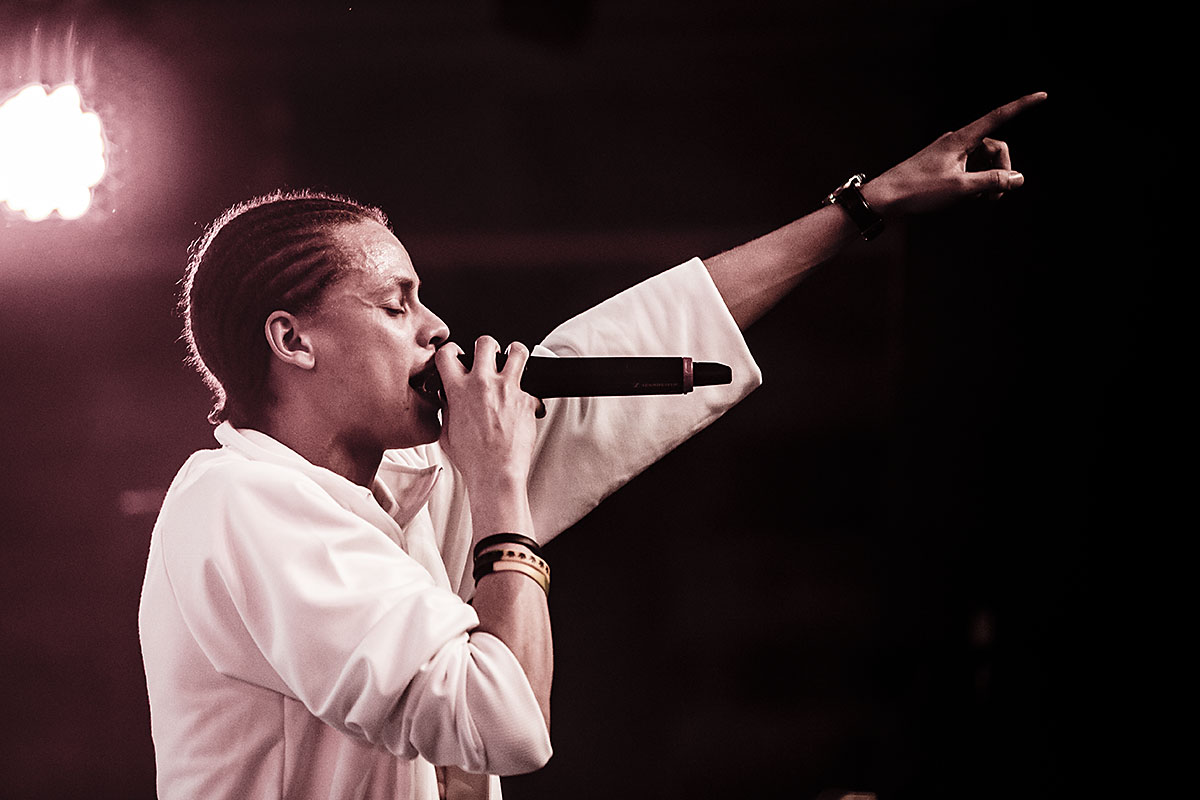

Background information
- Birth name: Rajabu Willer
- Also known as: Little Kaka, Lil' Kaka, Bigg Kaka
- Born: 19 February 1991 (age 34); Allerød, Denmark
- Genres: Dancehall, Hip hop
- Occupation: Danish singer of tanzanian origin
- Years active: 2007 – present
- Labels: Donkey Recs

Rajabu Willer (born 19 February 1991 in Allerød), better known as Kaka (Swahili for 'brother'; stylized KAKA), is a Danish reggae, dancehall and hip hop artist of Tanzanian descent. At various times, he was known as Little Kaka, Lil' Kaka and Bigg Kaka before dropping the adjectives.

In 2007, Kaka had his debut appearing on stage with Natasja Saad on her last shows in Copenhagen before she died in Jamaica. Kaka later collaborated with Lyrical D'Mirical and his sound system Splif Click also being part of the Danish reggae underground scene with Youngblood Sound. In 2009, he allied himself with the producers Pharfar and Fresh-I and their sound system Donkey Sound. In 2011, he was featured in Wafande's debut single "Gi' mig et smil" (meaning Give Me a Smile). Kaka had his own first release in collaboration with Donkey Sound in the track "Mere Energi". However, his biggest success came with "Bang Bang (Reggaejam)" on the newly formed label Donkey Recs (founded by Donkey Sound, producer duo Pharfar and Fresh-I and Musicall Management). The song charted in the Tracklisten, official Danish Singles Chart in 2012. He followed that up with the single "En sidste sang" in 2013, also a Top 20 hit in Denmark.

== Discography ==
=== EPs ===
Year	EP	Peak positions	Notes
Year	EP	DEN	Notes
2012	KAKA EP	–	Tracklist: 1. "Bang Bang (Reggaejam)" (3:26); 2. "Dansk Dancehall" (3:05); 3. "Nyder Livet" (3:06); 4. "Fornuften tilbage" (feat. Benny Jamz) (2:51); 5. "Ta' det roligt" (2:56)

=== Singles ===
Year	Single	Peak positions	Album
Year	Single	DEN	Album
2012	"Bang Bang (Reggaejam)"	20	KAKA EP
2013	"En sidste sang"	20	

Others / Videos

- 2011: "Mere Energi"
- 2011: "Hurtigere end dem"
- 2012: "Dansk Dancehall"
- 2013: "Ingen knive når vi fester"
- 2013: "En sidste sang"
- 2014: "Småproblemer"

Featured in

- 2011: "Gi' mig et smil" (Wafande feat. Kaka)
- 2012: "Ganja baby" (Cornstick & Kaka)
- 2012: "P6 BAS Dancehall Anthem" (Sukkerlyn, Raske Penge, Kaka, Pato, TopGunn, Klumben) (free single)
