= Kakki, Bannu =

Coordinates: 32°52′11″N 70°40′12″E

Kakki
- Town
- Interactive map of Kakki
- Country: Pakistan
- Province: Khyber Pakhtunkhwa
- District: Bannu District

Population
  - Total: More than 60,000
- Time zone: UTC+5 (PST)

Kakki is a town of Bannu District in Khyber Pakhtunkhwa province of Pakistan. It is located at 32°52'12N 70°39'45E and has an altitude of 307 metres (1,007 ft). The town of Kakki consists of two Union Councils and five mouzas.
