= Khaki-ye Sofla =

Village in Lorestan, Iran

Khaki-ye Sofla خاكي سفلي
- Village
- Location within Iran
- Coordinates: 34°10′19″N 47°37′27″E
- Country: Iran
- Province: Lorestan
- County: Delfan
- Bakhsh: Kakavand
- Rural District: Kakavand-e Gharbi

Population (2006)
  - Total: 177
- Time zone: UTC+3:30 (IRST)
  - Summer (DST): UTC+4:30 (IRDT)

Khaki-ye Sofla (Persian: خاكي سفلي, also Romanized as Khākī-ye Soflá; also known as Khākī-ye Pā’īn) is a village in Kakavand-e Gharbi Rural District, Kakavand District, Delfan County, Lorestan Province, Iran. At the 2006 census, its population was 177, in 24 families.
