= Khaki, Lorestan =

Khaki خاكي
- Village
- Location within Iran
- Coordinates: 34°10′27″N 47°57′36″E
- Country: Iran
- Province: Lorestan
- County: Delfan
- Bakhsh: Central
- Rural District: Nurali

Population (2006)
  - Total: 44
- Time zone: UTC+3:30 (IRST)
  - Summer (DST): UTC+4:30 (IRDT)

Khaki (Persian: خاكي, also Romanized as Khākī) is a village in Nurali Rural District, in the Central District of Delfan County, Lorestan Province, Iran. At the 2006 census, its population was 44, in 13 families.
