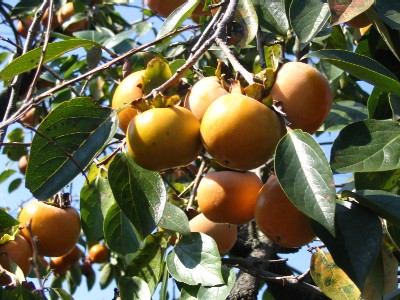
- Botanical details of buds, flowers and fruit

Conservation status
- Least Concern (IUCN 3.1)

Scientific classification
- Kingdom: Plantae
- Clade: Tracheophytes
- Clade: Angiosperms
- Clade: Eudicots
- Clade: Asterids
- Order: Ericales
- Family: Ebenaceae
- Genus: Diospyros
- Species: D. kaki

Binomial name
- Diospyros kaki Thunb.

Synonyms
- Diospyros chinensis Blume (nom. nud.) Diospyros kaki L.f.

= Diospyros kaki =

Oriental fruit

Diospyros kaki
- The Chinese character for "persimmon"

Chinese name
- Chinese: 柿(子)
Transcriptions
Standard Mandarin
- Hanyu Pinyin: shì(zi)
- Wade–Giles: shih^{4}(-tzŭ^{5})
- IPA: [ʂɨ̂] / [ʂɨ̂.tsɨ]
Yue: Cantonese
- Jyutping: Ci5
Southern Min
- Hokkien POJ: Khī(-a)

Korean name
- Hangul: 감
Transcriptions
- Revised Romanization: gam
- McCune–Reischauer: kam

Japanese name
- Kanji: 柿
Transcriptions
- Romanization: kaki

Diospyros kaki, the Oriental persimmon, Chinese persimmon, Japanese persimmon, kaki persimmon, or Fuyu persimmon, is the most widely cultivated species of the genus Diospyros. Although its first botanical description was not published until 1780, D. kaki cultivation in China dates back more than 2000 years.

== Names ==
Whether the species was first described by Carl Peter Thunberg or Carl Linnaeus the Younger is disputed. The scientific name Diospyros kaki L. f. may be used erroneously for this plant. However, Diospyros kaki L. f., published in 1781, is a later homonym of Diospyros kaki Thunb., published in 1780. So the name Diospyros kaki L. f. is taxonomically illegitimate and not accepted.

It is called shi (柿) in Chinese, kaki (柿) in Japanese, gam (감) in Korean, kesemek in Indonesia and haluwabed (हलुवाबेद) in Nepali.

== Tree ==
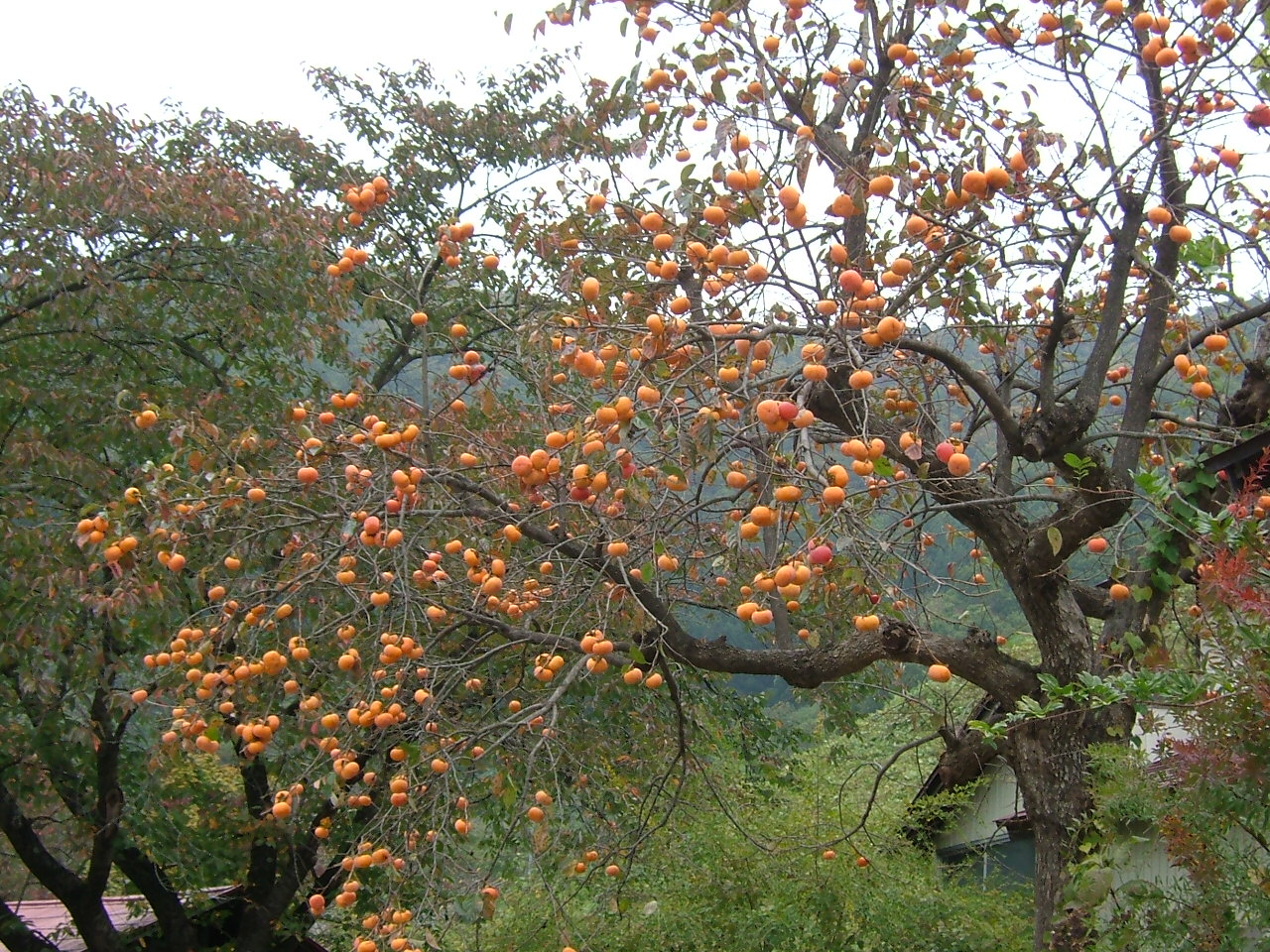
Tree in Nan'yō, Japan

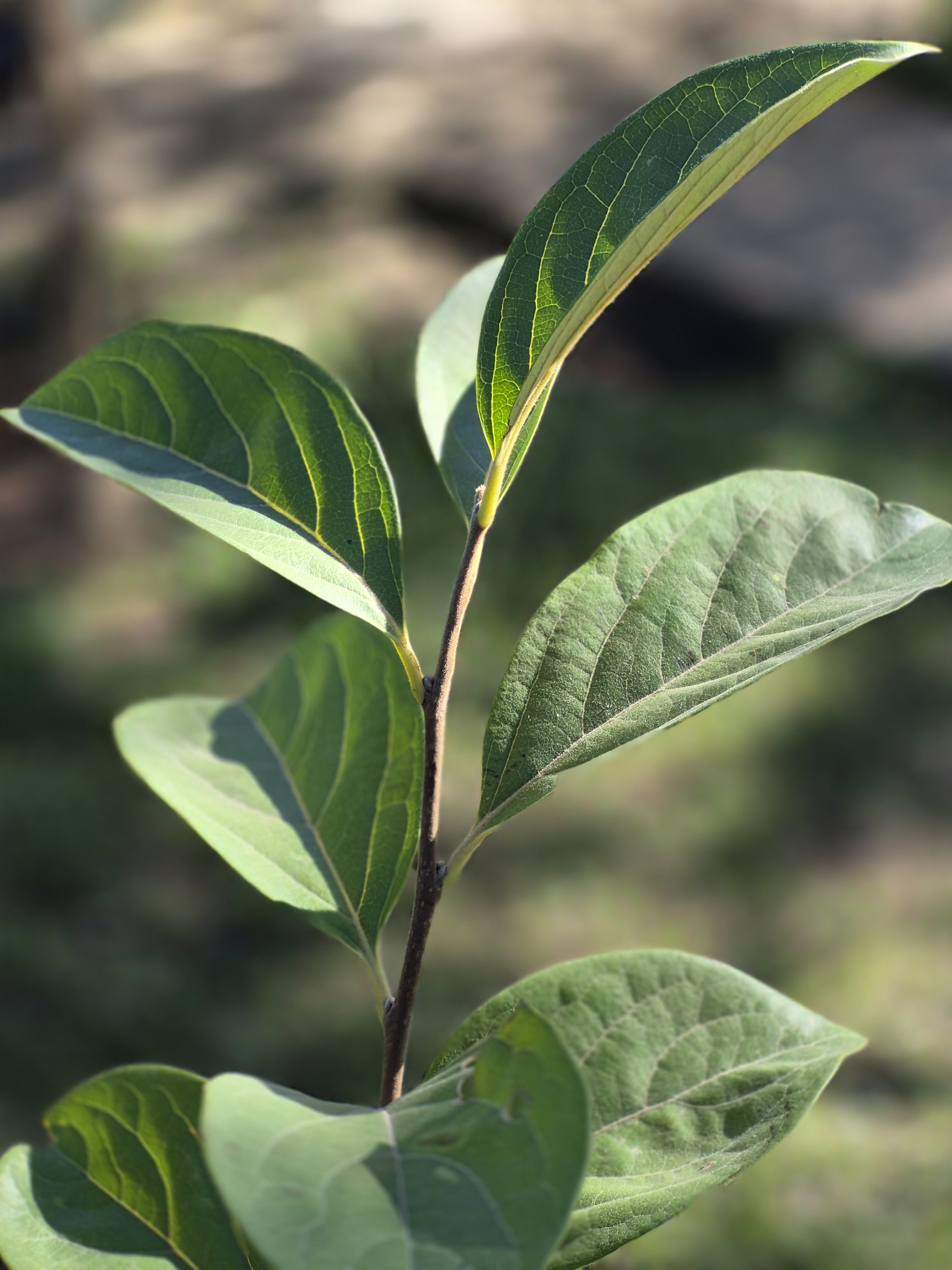
Leaves of Diospyros kaki, showing alternate phyllotaxy.

Similar in shape to an apple tree, the Diospyros kaki tree reaches a size of up to 10 metres (33 ft). Its deciduous leaves are medium to dark green, broadly lanceolate, stiff and equally wide as long. Blooming from May to June, the trees are typically either male or female, but some produce both types of flowers. Furthermore, the sexual expression of a tree may vary from year to year. Unusually, the fruits ripen when the leaves have mostly fallen off the tree, typically in October and November. (Northern Hemisphere)

Pestalotiopsis fungal spp. causes leaf spot on Diospyros kaki.

== Flower ==
Diospyros kaki trees typically do not bear until they are three to six years old. The flowers are 2.0 to 2.5 cm (3/4 to 1 in) wide and appear in late spring or early summer, depending on variety and growing area. The tubular flowers have a creamy white color. Female flowers grow singly, while male flowers sometimes may have a pink tint and tend to appear in clusters of three. Diospyros kaki is typically a dioecious species, which means that trees are either male or female, but some cultivated varieties are monoecious. In that case both male and female, and even perfect (male+female), flowers can be found on the same tree. The flowers have four crown-shaped sepals and four petals that form a large calyx.

All varieties (parthenocarpic) will produce seedless fruit in the absence of pollination, but their pollinated flowers will produce more fruit riddled with seeds. Diospyros kaki typically suffers very important fruit drop. The first flush of fruit drop happens shortly after flowering, when +/- 50% of the fruit will drop. The second flush happens in August when again many fruits will drop. After this, the rest of the fruit will usually stay on the tree and mature. Fruit drop depends on climatic conditions and water availability. Pollination is not necessary for fruit set, but it may help reduce fruit drop after averse climatic conditions or drought periods.

== Fruit ==
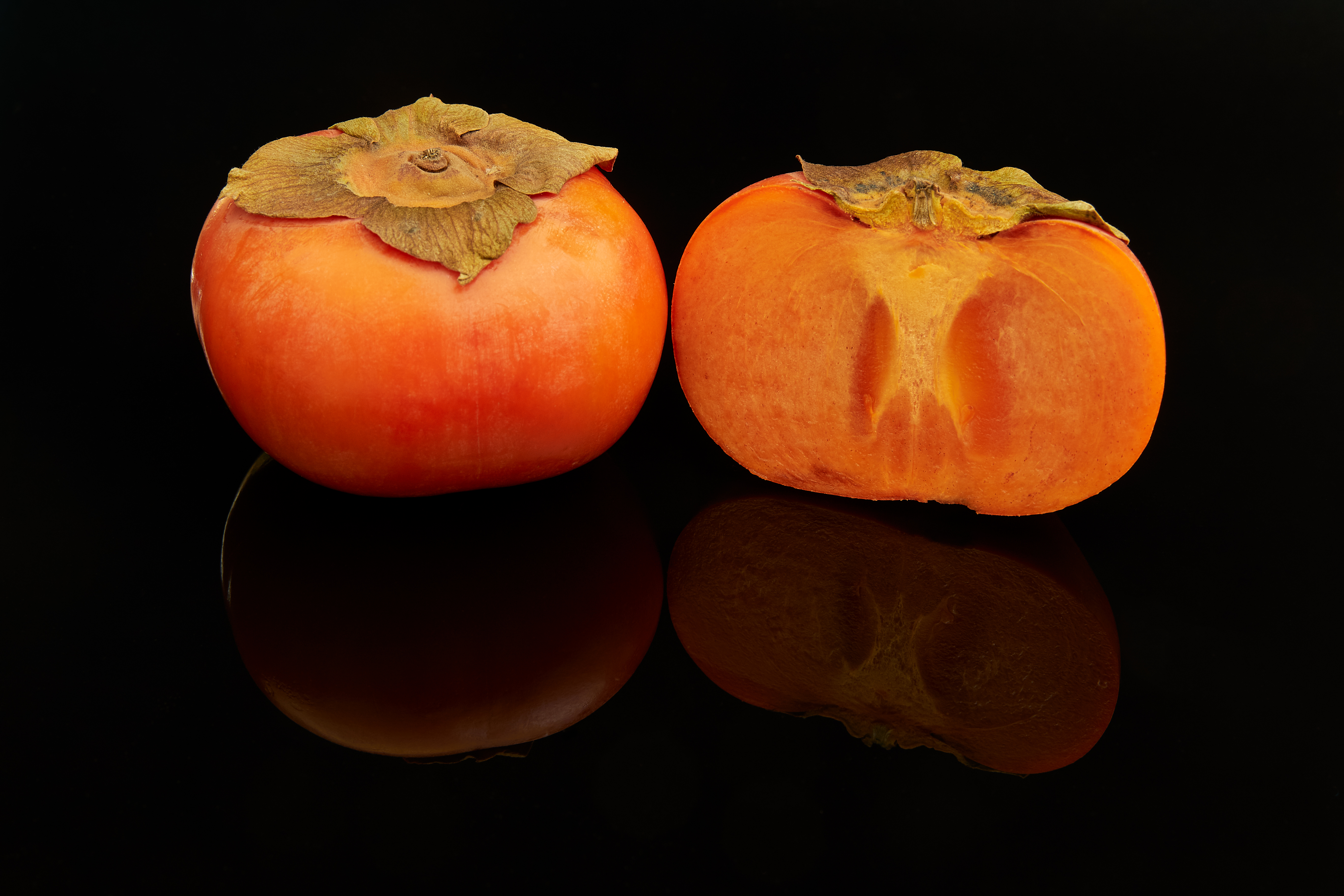
Two fruits, one cut open

The persimmon is an edible sweet, slightly tangy fruit with a soft to occasionally fibrous texture. This species, native to China, is deciduous, with broad, stiff leaves. It was first cultivated in China more than 2000 years ago, and introduced to Japan in the 7th century and to Korea in the 14th century. It was later introduced to California and southern Europe in the 19th century, to Brazil in the 1890s. Numerous cultivars have been selected, and one variety is Diospyros kaki var. sylvestris Makino.

When ripe, the fruit comprises thick pulpy jelly encased in a waxy thin-skinned shell. The spherical to oval fruit, bearing the indented stem and four sepals, can weigh up to 500 grams (18 oz). The smooth, shiny, thin shell ranges in shade from yellow to red-orange. The slightly lighter fleshed fruits can contain up to eight seeds and may have an astringent taste. With increasing maturity, the fruit softens, similar to a kiwifruit.

The high content of tannin in the still-immature fruit provides a bitter component reminiscent of a raw unpeeled chestnut, which weakens with progressive maturation. The furry taste, caused by the tannins, is reduced and finally completely disappears during the ripening process.

The astringent flavour can be removed by treatment with carbon dioxide.

=== Varieties ===
Diospyros kaki varieties are classified into four basic types, depending on the solubility of their tannin and the presence of seeds. Soluble tannin means that the fruit will have an acrid taste. Insoluble tannin means that there is no acrid taste. In some cases, the presence of seeds will turn the tannin insoluble in the whole of the fruit and in other cases only just around the seeds. this results in the following classification:

- PCA type: Pollination constant astringent. These have a bitter taste until they become completely soft. The ripening process turns the tannin insoluble, after which all bitterness disappears and the sweet fruit can be enjoyed.
- PCNA type: Pollination constant non astringent, which is a relatively recent mutation in the fruit (a few centuries). In this type, the tannin is always insoluble even when the fruit is still hard. This fruit will always taste sweet without any bitterness in the hard or soft stage.
- PVNA type: Pollination variant non astringent. This type of fruit has to become soft before it is edible except if it is seeded. A substance in the seed makes the tannin insoluble and thus the seeded fruit will be sweet even when it is still hard. Even one seed is usually sufficient to make the fruit edible. Fruit from the same tree that does not contain seed will taste bitter and needs to soften before it becomes edible.
- PVA type: Pollination variant astringent. This type is similar to the previous type but in this case only the flesh around the seeds will have no bitter taste. The rest of the fruit will taste bitter. This is due to a different process in tannin neutralization by the seeds. The result is that sometimes only half of the fruit (the part containing seeds) may be edible and the other half will be bitter if it contains no seeds.

Practically and commercially, only the first two types are important. The other two types are considered astringent for practical reasons and are handled just like the PCA type fruit.

== Chemistry ==
Apart from tannins, triterpenoid compounds such as α-amyrin, uvaol, ursolic acid, 19α-hydroxy ursolic acid and 19 α,24-dihydroxy ursolic acid can be isolated from the leaves of D. kaki.

The high content of the carotenoids beta-cryptoxanthin, beta-carotene, and zeaxanthin, along with some lutein and alpha-carotene makes the fruit nutritionally valuable.

== Cultivation ==
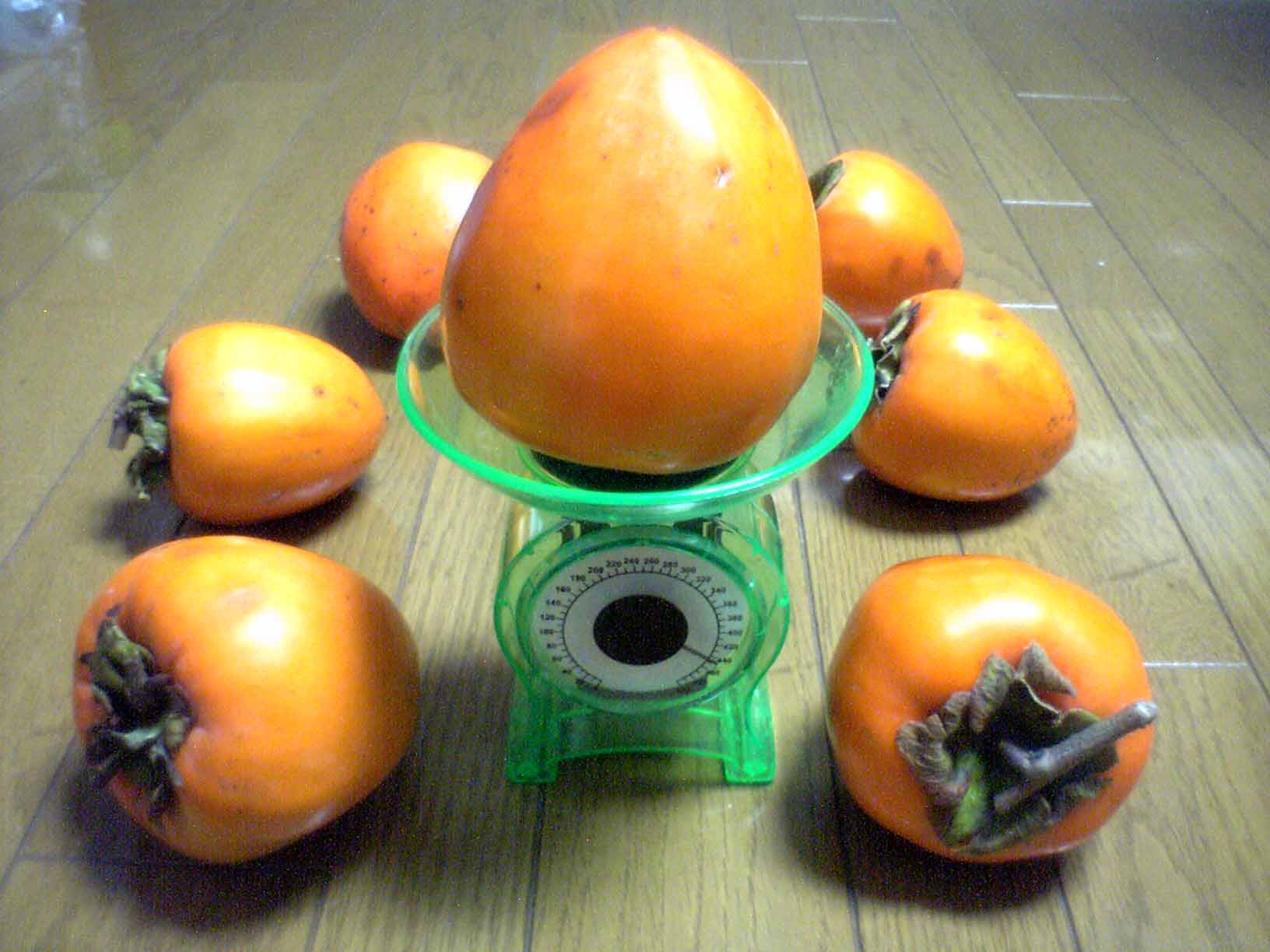
Koushu-Hyakume variety (astringent - for making dried fruit)

Diospyros kaki is grown worldwide, with 90 percent of the total in China, Japan and Korea. In East Asia the main harvest time is in the months of October and November. The trees lose their leaves by harvest time. Occasionally, the brightly colored fruit is left unharvested on the tree as a decorative effect.

Cultivation of this species at first spread through East Asia. Since the 19th century, Diospyros kaki partially replaced date-plum (Diospyros lotus, also known as Caucasian persimmon) in some countries in South Europe and West Asia, because of its bigger fruits than date-plum; cultivation in California began at that time.

The "Sharon" is a trade name for the "Triumph" variety grown in the fertile Plain of Sharon in Israel. It is a PCA variety which is always treated with carbon dioxide (CO_{2}) gas to remove astringency before it is marketed. This variety has a rather squarish shape and one of the highest sugar contents of all varieties. Unlike most other varieties, it has a very firm skin which gives it good keeping qualities and good resistance to handling.

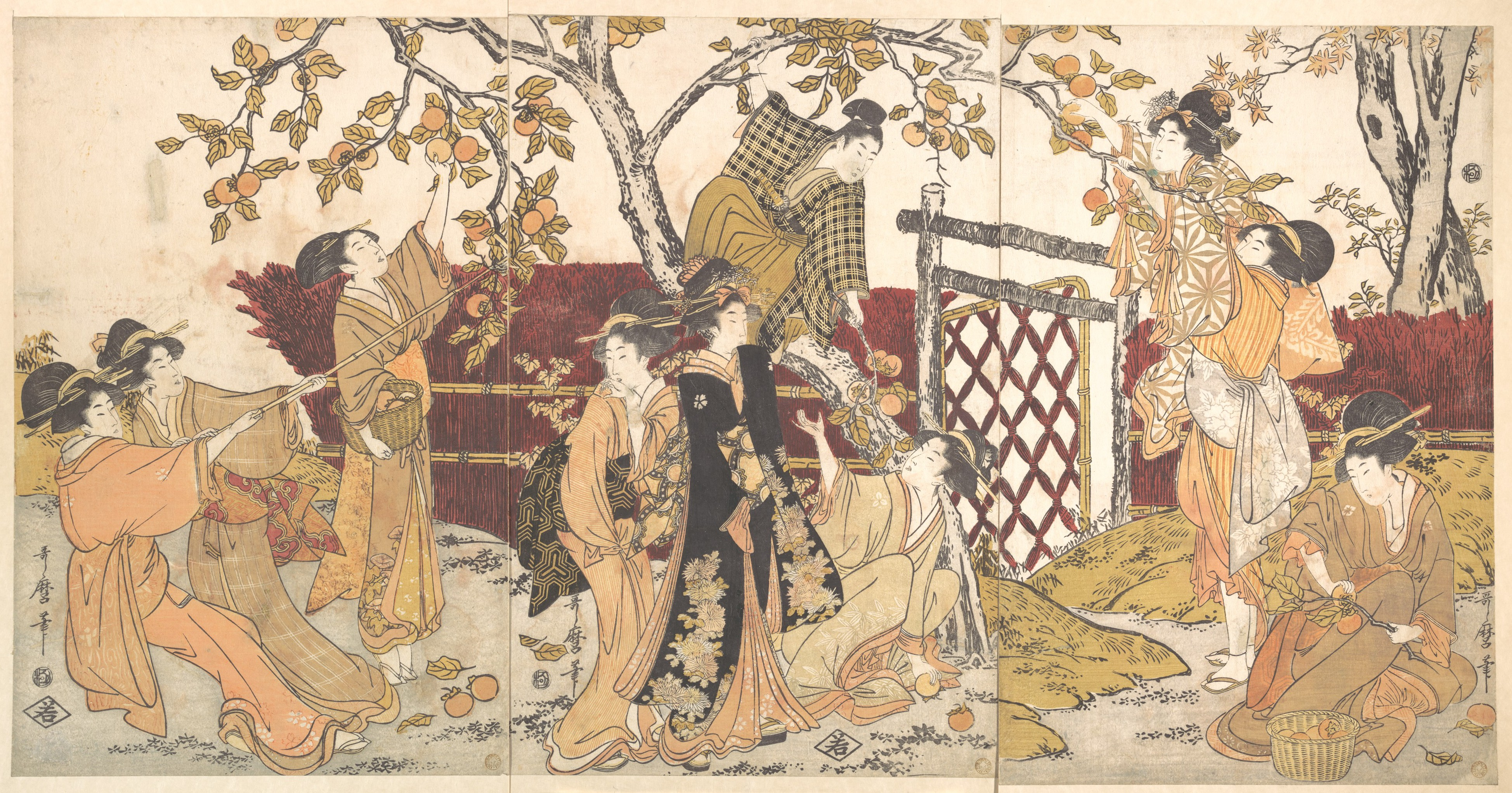
Picking Persimmons, print by Kitagawa Utamaro, 1804

In Spain, the most important variety is Rojo Brillante. This PCA variety is mostly grown in the Valencia region in a protected region of origin (DOP) called the Ribera del Xuquer. During the last decade a CO_{2} treatment procedure has led to Rojo Brillante varieties with no astringency while still retaining qualities such as their firmness. This treated fruit is marketed as "Spanish Persimon" (with one 'm'). Following this treatment, the Rojo brillante variety gained recognition for being a more readily edible fruit, leading to increased production.

In Italy the most widely grown variety is Tipo (PCA) and some other varieties in smaller quantities. Italy used to be the largest Diospyros kaki exporting country in Europe, but export diminished significantly exports from Spain succeeded.

Diospyros kaki is also produced in Albania, mainly in the Elbasan region. Since 1935–40, it is also grown in small quantities in Bulgaria, particularly in the Upper Thracian Plain and on the Bulgarian Black Sea Coast.

Successful hybridization between the kaki and the American persimmon (Diospyros virginiana) first took place at Nikitsky Botanic Garden in Crimea. These hybrids have modest fruit size and improved cold-hardiness.

In astringent cultivars (cultivated varieties), the fruit has a high proanthocyanidin-type tannin content which makes the immature fruit astringent and bitter. The tannin levels are reduced as the fruit matures. The fruit of those cultivars is not edible in its crisp, firm state; they're edible when soft ripe. The ripe fruit has a soft jelly-like consistency. The Japanese 'Hachiya' is a widely grown astringent cultivar. Other cultivars, such as 'Fuyu', do not contain tannins when firm. Those can be eaten like an apple or can be allowed to go to any stage of ripeness, including to the jelly-like stage. These non-astringent varieties are, however, considered to have a less complex flavor.

=== United States ===
In the United States most Diospyros kaki production takes place in the states of Florida and California. The first commercial orchards in Florida were planted in the 1870s. Most persimmon orchards in the US are small-scale (70% less than 0.40 ha or 1 acre and 90% less than 2.0 ha or 5 acres).

== In culture ==
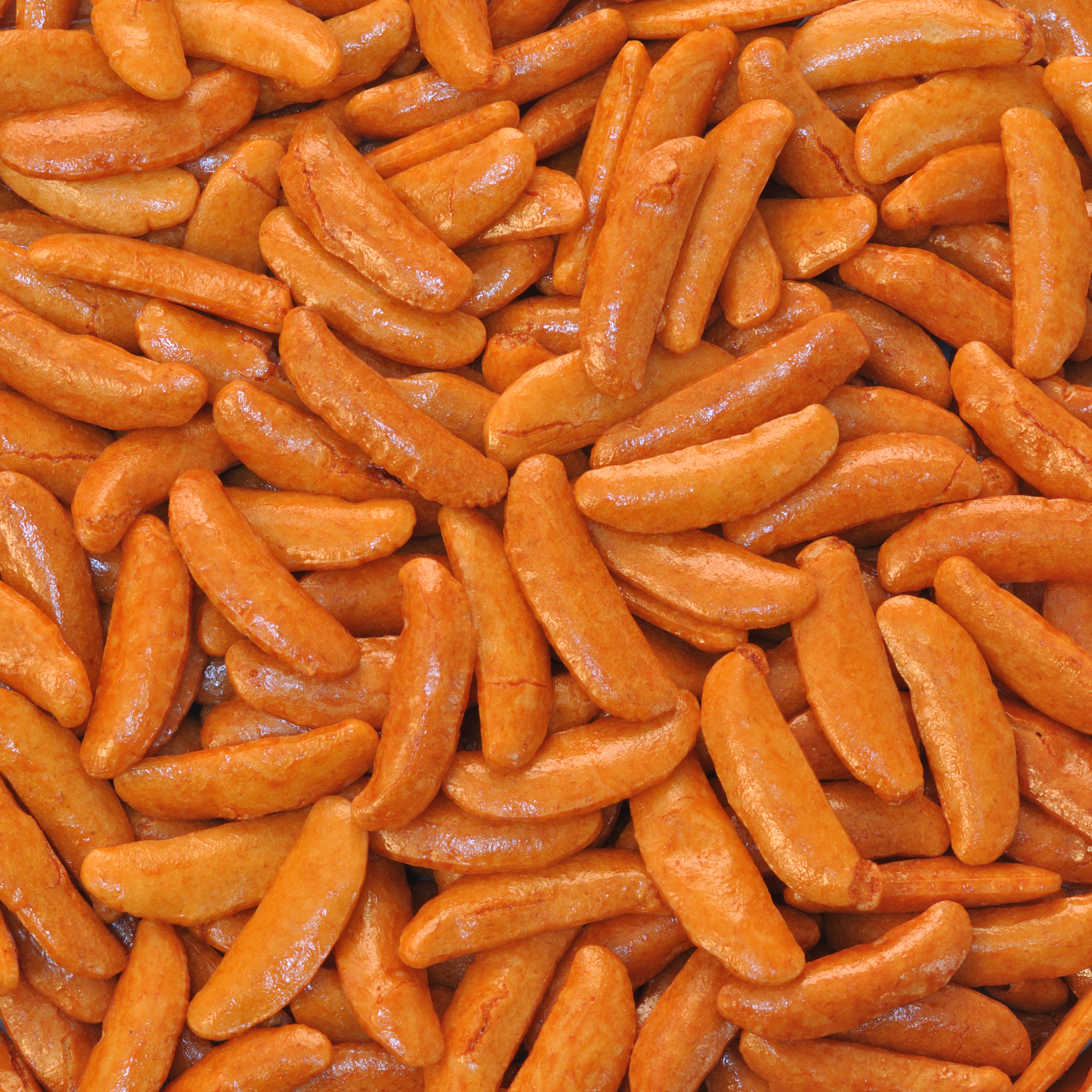
Kaki no tane, a type of rice cracker shaped like persimmon seeds

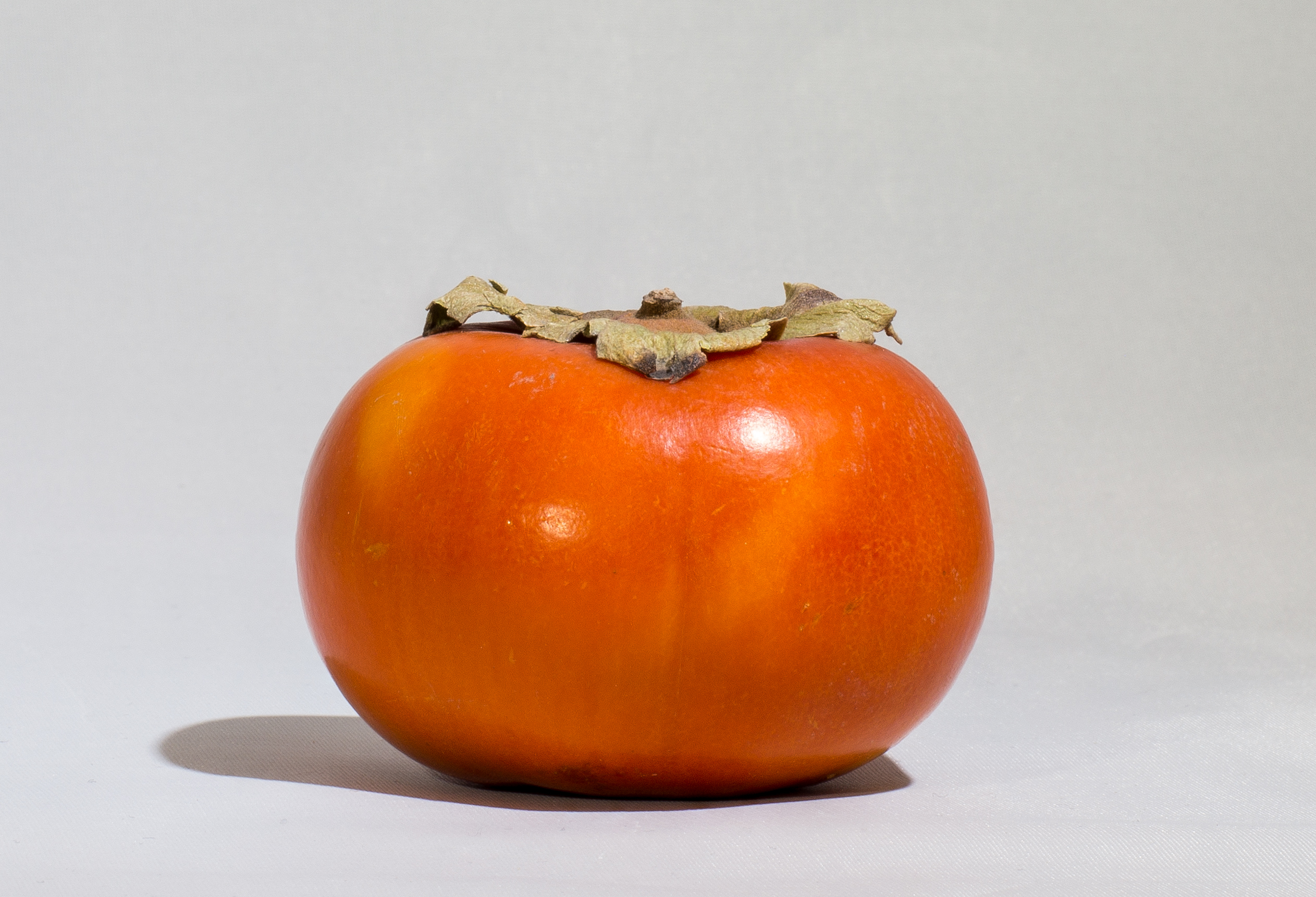
Fuyu persimmon

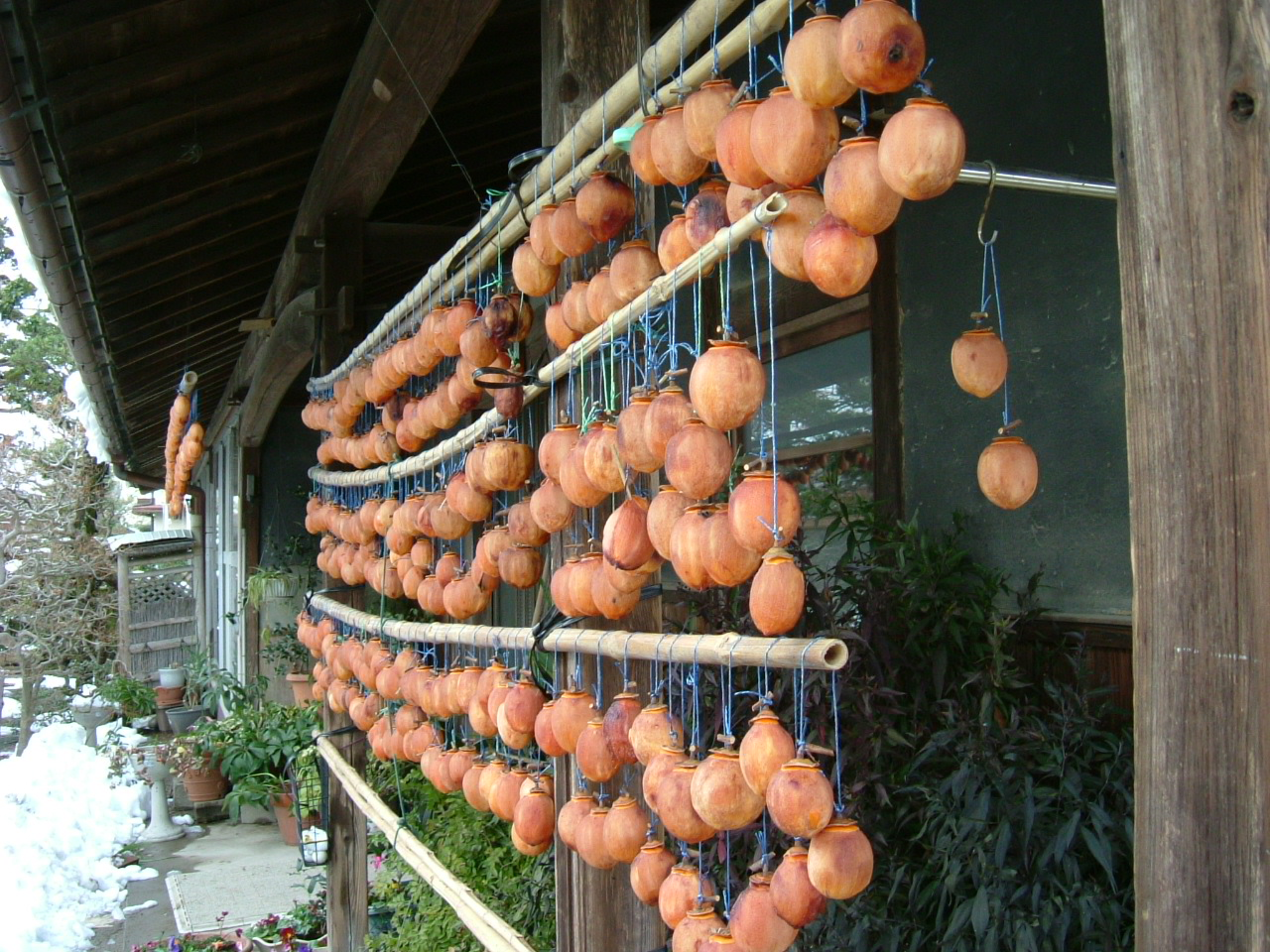
Drying in the eaves of a house, Gifu Prefecture, Japan

Throughout Asia, healing properties are attributed to Diospyros kaki. They are said to be helpful against stomach ailments and diarrhea. Immature fruits are said to be a treatment for fever, if they ripen in containers until they are sweet as honey. The juice of unripe fruit is said to lower blood pressure and the fruit stem to relieve a cough. To reinforce these effects, the fruit is peeled before use, exposed to the sunlight during the day and to the dew at night, until a white powdery coating forms.

A vase adorned with a Chinese persimmon cake, a pine branch and an orange is a symbol of the desire for "great happiness in 100 affairs".

== Consumption ==
The leaves are commonly removed before serving. Though the skin is often removed, it may be eaten, especially when the fruit has ripened and the tannins have significantly broken down, reducing the astringency. They can also be dried; two fruits are attached to a string which is then hung over a pole.

In Korea, it is usually eaten as a dessert or when there are guests at home. The persimmon is cut into sections and the skin and core is usually removed. Persimmons are eaten dry during the winter, and they are very popular amongst children. In autumn, families and farmers from the rural areas collect persimmons and hang them to dry. Powdered sugar is sometimes added to enhance the sweetness.

Persimmon leaves used to wrap sushi is a regional speciality of Nara Prefecture, Japan.

Persimmon vinegar may be made from Chinese persimmons.
