= Kakhi =

Kakhi is a masculine Georgian name and nickname. Notable people with this name include:

- Kakhi Asatiani (1947–2002), Georgian association footballer and manager
- Kakhi Gogichaishvili (Kakhaber Gogichaishvili, born 1968), Georgian footballer
- Kakhi Kakhiashvili (born 1969).Georgian-Greek weightlifter
- Kakhi Kaladze (Kakhaber Kaladze, born 1978), Georgian politician and footballer
- Kakhi Kavsadze (1935–2021), Georgian and Soviet actor
- Kakhi Makharadze (born 1987), Georgian footballer
