= Almanac (disambiguation) =

An almanac is an annual publication listing a set of current information.

Almanac or Almanach may also refer to:

== Literature ==
- Almanac (Pennsylvania), a weekly newspaper in Washington County, Pennsylvania
- The Almanac (Menlo Park), a weekly California newspaper
- Nautical almanac, a publication describing the positions of a selection of celestial bodies

== Music and theatre ==
- Almanac (band), a 1970s free jazz ensemble
- Almanac, a metal band formed in 2015 by Victor Smolski
- Almanac (Almanac album), 1977
- Almanac (They Might Be Giants album), 2002
- Almanac, an album by the Nadas, 2010
- The Almanac, an EP by Nine Mile, 2006
- John Murray Anderson's Almanac, a 1953 Broadway musical revue
- Almanach (album), a 1976 album by Malicorne

== Television ==
- Almanac (American TV series), a public-affairs program produced by Twin Cities Public Television
- Almanac (Canadian TV series), a 1961 documentary series

== Other uses ==
- ALMANAC (Axillary Lymphatic Mapping Against Nodal Axillary Clearance), a UK breast cancer trial
- Almanac Beer Company, an American brewery
- GPS Almanac, a digital schedule of satellite orbital parameters for GPS receivers

== See also ==
- List of almanacs
