= Persimmon vinegar =

Culinary ingredient

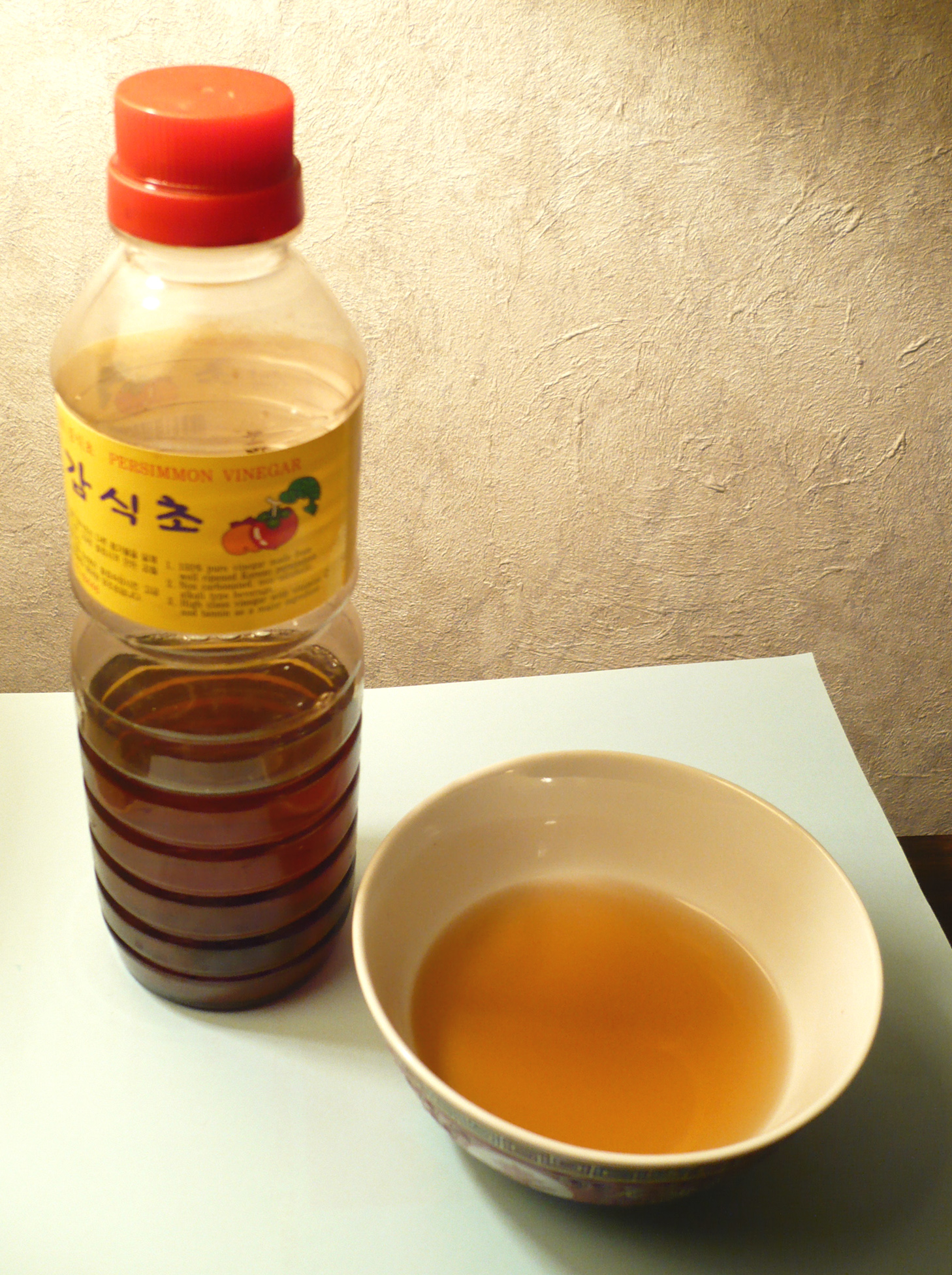
- Alternative names: Gam-sikcho
- Type: Vinegar
- Place of origin: Korea
- Associated cuisine: Korean cuisine
- Main ingredients: Persimmon

Korean name
- Hangul: 감식초
- Hanja: 감食醋
- RR: gamsikcho
- MR: kamsikch'o
- IPA: [kam.ɕik̚.tɕʰo]

Persimmon vinegar (Korean: 감식초) is a vinegar made from fermented Oriental persimmon. Called gam-sikcho (감식초) in Korean, it is a traditional condiment, food ingredient, and beverage base in Korean cuisine.

Persimmon vinegar is reported to help reduce liver cholesterol and prevent metabolic disorders induced by chronic alcohol intake.

Persimmon vinegar made with 'meoksi' persimmons, a native Korean variety with small, very sweet fruits with high tannin content, was included in the Ark of Taste catalogue of heritage foods in 2014.
