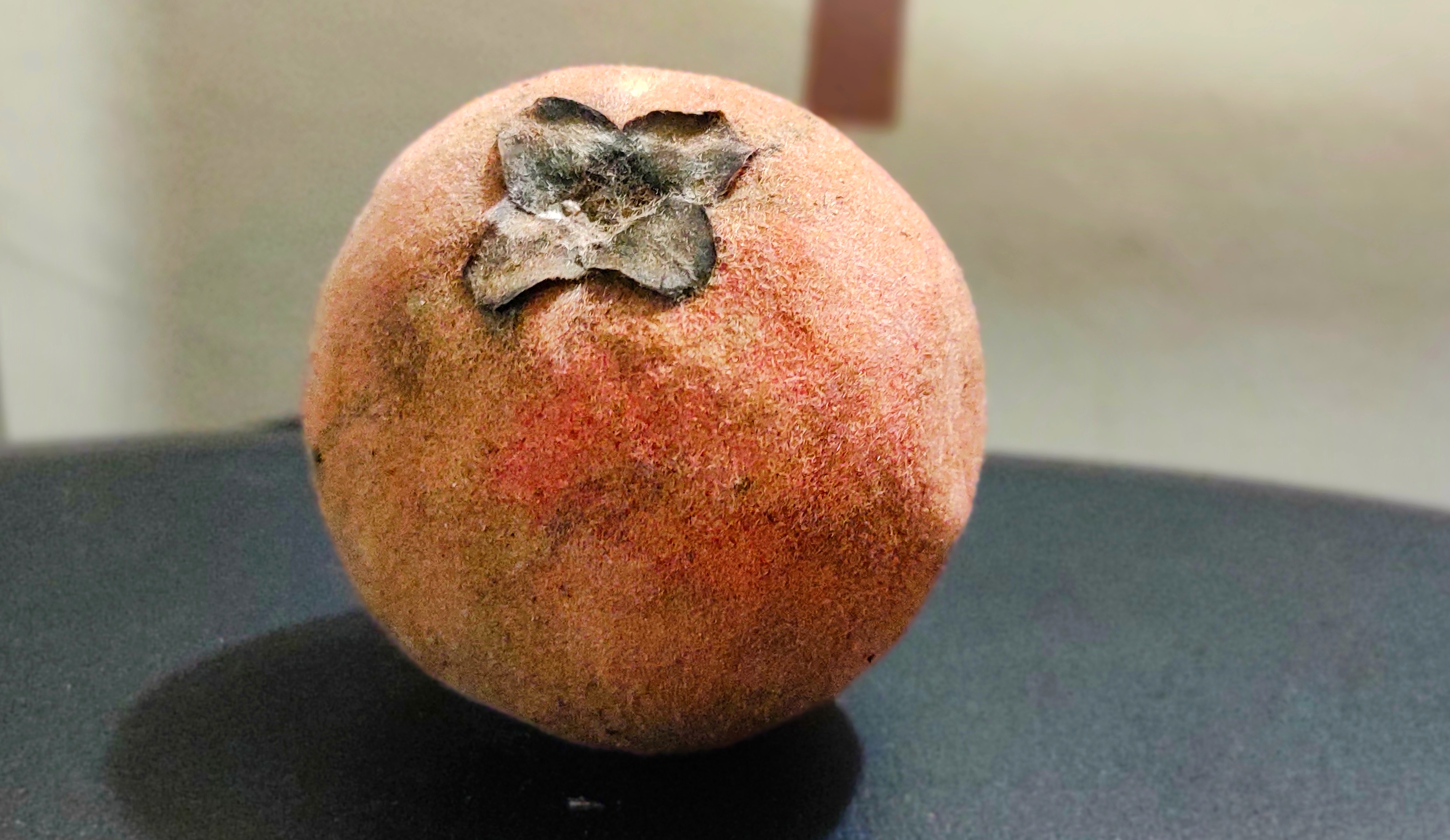
- A velvet apple

Scientific classification
- Kingdom: Plantae
- Clade: Tracheophytes
- Clade: Angiosperms
- Clade: Eudicots
- Clade: Asterids
- Order: Ericales
- Family: Ebenaceae
- Genus: Diospyros
- Species: D. blancoi

Binomial name
- Diospyros blancoi A.DC.

Synonyms
- Cavanillea mabolo Poir.; Cavanillea philippensis Desr.; Diospyros discolor Willd.; Diospyros durionoides Bakh.; Diospyros mabolo (Poir.) Roxb. ex Lindl.; Diospyros mabolo Roxb. ex J.V.Thomps.; Diospyros malacapai A.DC.; Diospyros merrillii Elmer; Diospyros philippensis (Desr.) Gürke; Diospyros utilis Hemsl.; Embryopteris discolor (Willd.) G.Don; Mabola edulis Raf.

= Diospyros blancoi =

Velvet apple

Species of persimmon

Diospyros blancoi, (synonym Diospyros discolor), commonly known as velvet apple, velvet persimmon, kamagong, or mabolo tree, is a tree of the genus Diospyros of ebony trees and persimmons. It produces edible fruit with a fine, velvety, reddish-brown fur-like covering. The fruit has a soft, creamy, pink flesh, with a taste and aroma comparable to peaches.

It is widely distributed and native to the Philippines, but it is also native to eastern and southern Taiwan. It has also been introduced to other parts of Southeast Asia, the Pacific Islands, South Asia, the Caribbean, Florida, and other tropical regions.

== Cultivation ==
It is a dioecious tropical tree that grows well in a diversity of soil, from sea level to 750 metres (2,400 ft) above sea level. Seed trees are normally planted 10–15 metres (30–45 ft) from each other; this one can be planted from 7.5–9 metres (25–30 ft) from each other. It needs a good distribution of rainfall through the year. Trees that were planted by seeds could take 6 or 7 years to give out fruit, but trees that were propagated by cuttings produce fruit in 3 or 4 years. It is a very productive tree.

The fact that fruits vary greatly – in shape, color, hairiness and taste – suggests that there is a great deal of genetic variation in the plant. Seedless cultivars exist, and are highly favored since in the normal varieties the large seeds occupy a considerable volume of the fruit.

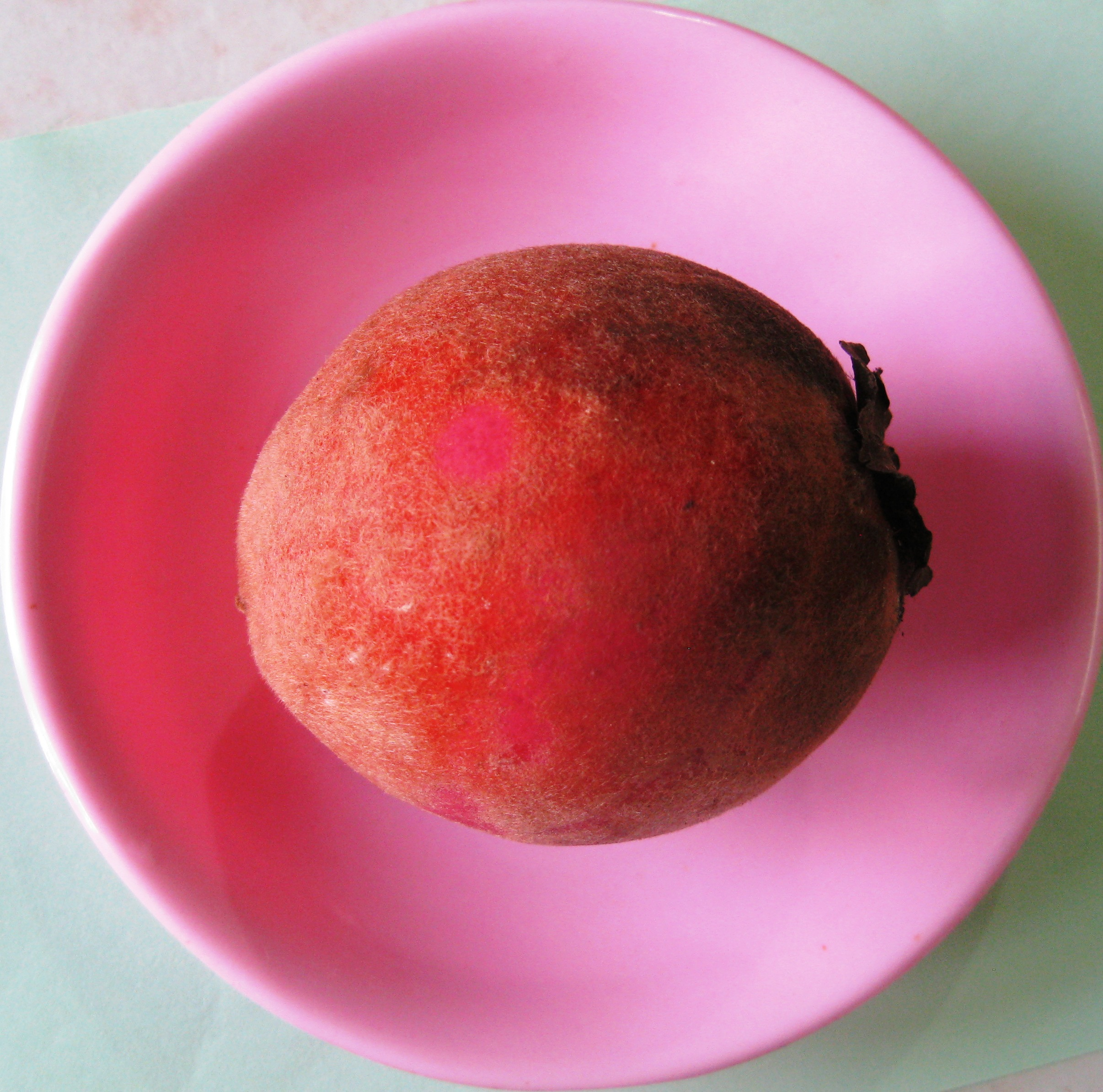
Velvet apple (Diospyros discolor)

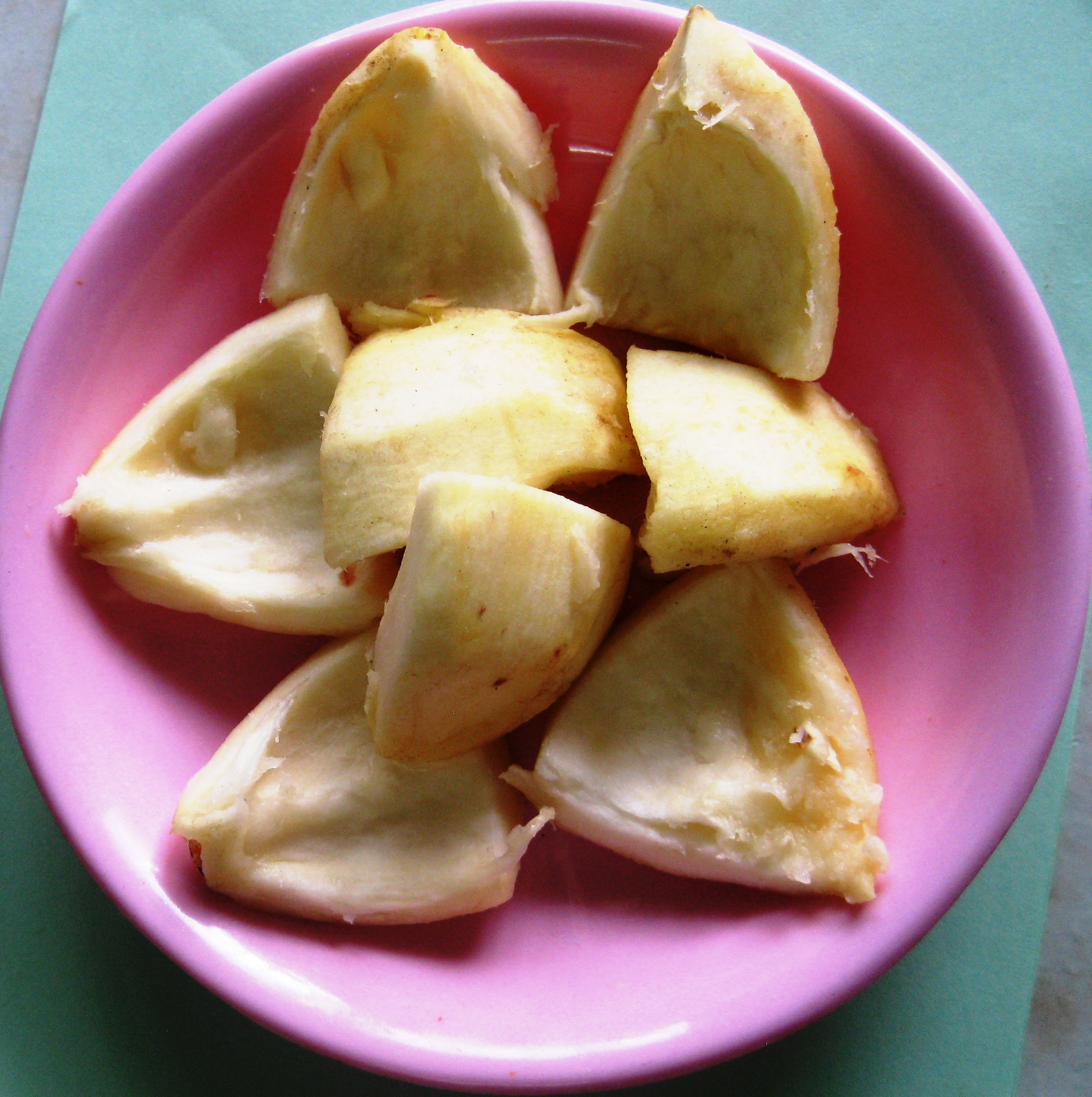
Velvet apple (sliced)

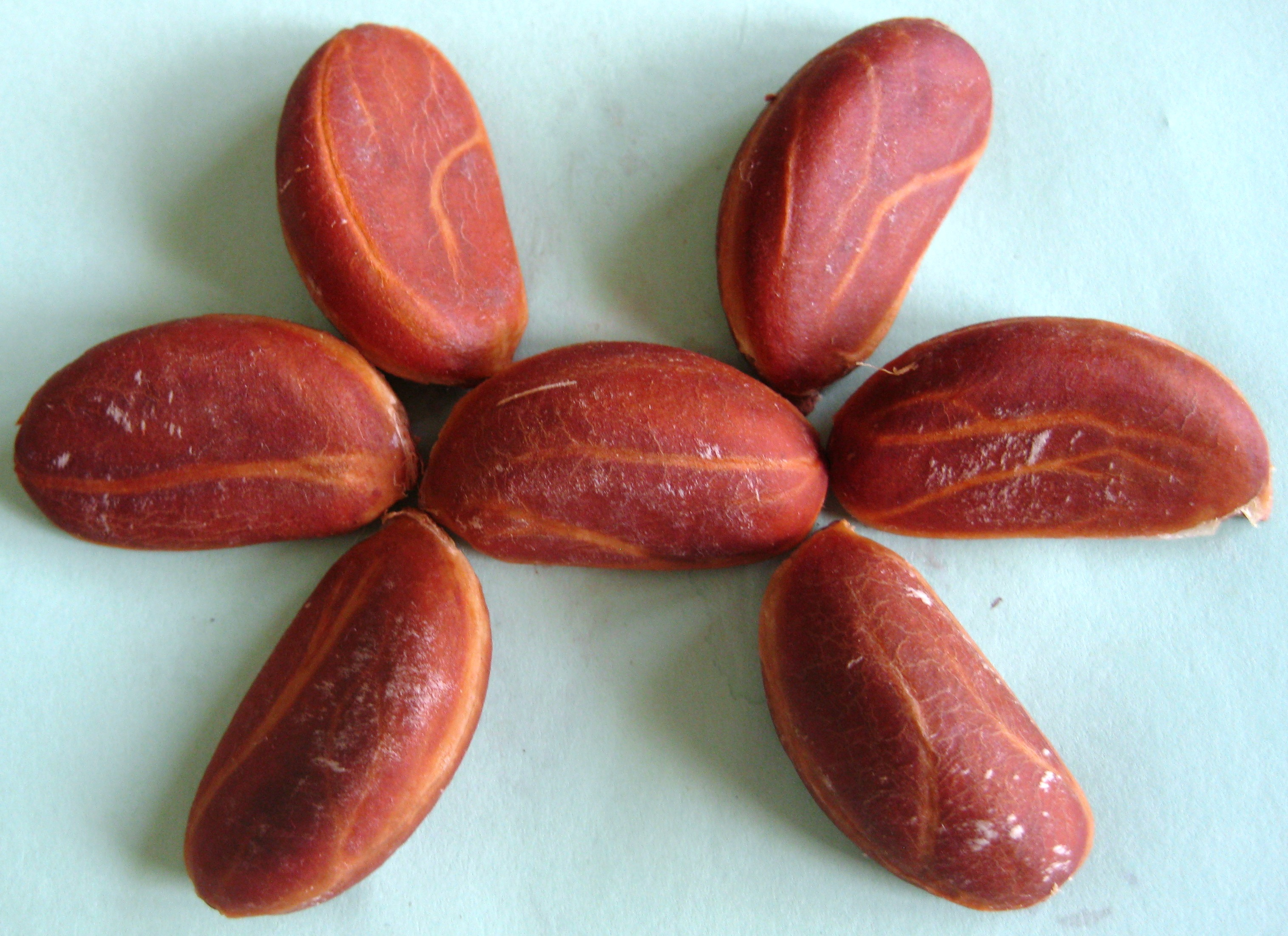
Velvet apple (Diospyros discolor) seeds

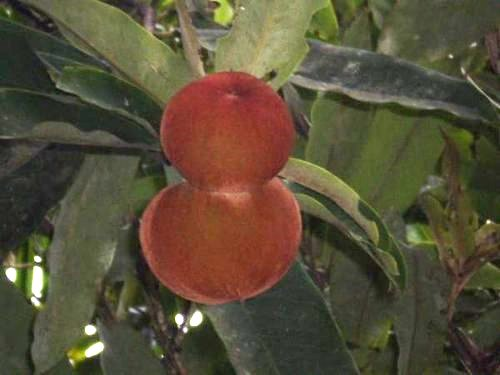
Mabolo fruit

== Timber ==
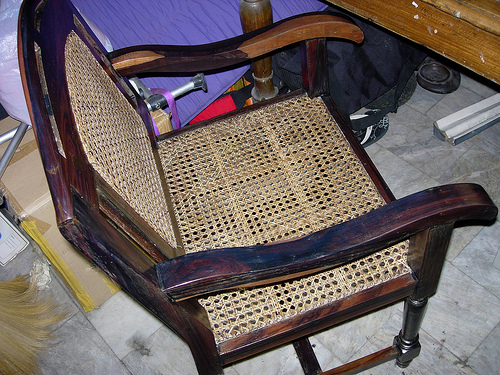
A Kamagong chair

Like that of other trees in Dyospiros, which includes ebony, Kamagong timber is extremely dense and hard and is famous for its dark color.

The wood is generally used for house construction which include flooring, post, doors, and windows, among others. Finished products from kamagong wood, such as fine furniture and decoratives can be exported, provided that they are properly documented and approved by the Customs authorities. Kamagong is also popular for martial arts training implements such as bokken and eskrima sticks.

== Secondary metabolites ==
The leaves of velvet apple trees have been shown to contain isoarborinol methyl ether (also called cylindrin) and fatty esters of α- and β-amyrin. Both isoarborinol methyl ether and the amyrin mixture demonstrated antimicrobial activity against Escherichia coli, Pseudomonas aeruginosa, Candida albicans, Staphylococcus aureus and Trichophyton mentagrophytes. Anti-inflammatory and analgesic properties have also been shown for the isolated amyrin mixture.

== Governance ==
It is an endangered tree species and protected by Philippine law – it is illegal to export kamagong timber from the country without special permission from the Bureau of Forestry, Department of Environment and Natural Resources.

== See also ==
- Diospyros mespiliformis
- Mangosteen
- Persimmon
