= Almanac Beer Company =

Coordinates: 37.7834°N 122.2991°W

- Type: Private
- Industry: Alcoholic beverages
- Founded: 2010
- Headquarters: Alameda, California, United States
- Products: Beer
- Owner: Jesse Friedman; Damian Fagan
- Website: almanacbeer.com

Almanac Beer Company is an Alameda, California brewer that makes farm-to-table beers in small batches using fruit, grains and herbs purchased from local family farms. The company has brewed both year-round table beers and special releases, as well as beers set aside from larger batches and aged in oak barrels. Almanac is best known for its oak-aged sours and farmhouse ales.

== History ==
Almanac was founded in 2010 by Jesse Friedman and Damian Fagan. The business partners, who met at a homebrewers club three years before, were influenced by Alice Waters and her emphasis on regional, seasonal ingredients. "If there's one local brewery that has worked to build bridges within the culinary world, it's Almanac Beer Co, which has always had ties with Northern California's sustainable farming community and a focus on beers that pair well with food", wrote Jason Henry on an SF Weekly blog.

Almanac was a San Francisco Bay Guardian Best of the Bay 2012 editor's pick. The brewer's Farmer's Reserve No. 4 was a Draft Magazine pick for the top 25 beers of 2013.

In December 2016, Almanac opened a taproom, its first retail outlet, in San Francisco's Mission District with indoor seating and a year-round beer garden. In February 2018, Almanac opened a 30,000 square foot production facility, its first, as well as a second taproom, both housed in a 1940s hangar at the former Naval Air Station Alameda.

Friedman exited the company in August 2018 while remaining on its board.

== Beers ==
The company's business strategy suggests that beer can be priced, aged, marketed, released in limited quantities and consumed like wine. Debuting at $20 a bottle in late 2011, Almanac was expensive for a beer, but comparable with the least expensive wines typically found on a restaurant's list. Almanac initially sold its special release beers in 750 milliliter bottles, a size commonly used for wine. Fagen's design for the die-cut labels borrows from both wine and 19th century scotch bottles. Almanac has released some beers that have been aged, like wine, in oak barrels and has promoted the idea that good beer has a place at the dining table by encouraging chefs to pair Almanac beer with their dishes.

Almanac's first beer, "Summer 2010 Blackberry Ale", was a Belgian-style golden ale made from four varieties of Sonoma County blackberries purchased from Sebastopol Berry Farm. The beer was aged in red wine barrels for 11 months before blending, then bottled in May 2011, yielding 309 cases. A critic previewing the beer described it as "dry, crisp and complex", which "should appeal to those who would normally avoid beers made with fruit." The beer premiered after a three-month delay and was launched at venues in San Francisco.

Almanac followed with "Autumn 2011 Farmhouse Pale", a Belgian-style farmhouse ale brewed with 1,000 pounds of organic San Joaquin Valley plums from Twin Girls Farm in Yettem, California and organic wheat from Massa Organics in Glenn County, California. In April 2012, the Fairmont San Francisco hotel's Laurel Court Restaurant and Bar began offering variation of this release on draft, brewed with 200 pounds of honey from the hotel's rooftop apiary. The collaboration was part of a hospitality industry trend in which hotels brew their own beer or work with local brewers. The resulting beer was described by a reporter as having "the light feel of a wheat beer with a tinkling of hop bitterness, plus sour notes from the farmhouse approach and a lingering touch of honeycomb."

Almanac introduced its year-round family of beers, called the California Table Beer Series, in August 2012, beginning with Honey Saison and Extra Pale Ale. The releases sold in four-packs at a suggested retail price of $11. In January 2013, after resolving never to brew an India Pale Ale because of heavy competition, Almanac bowed to customer demand and produced a single origin IPA using hops from Hops-Meister Farm in Clearlake.

In January 2013, the company announced the first three "Farm to Barrel" oak-aged beers. Sold in 375ml bottles, the beers had been aged, some for more than a year, as part of a collection of some 250 barrels. The releases included Barrel Noir, a blend of a Belgian style dark ale, aged for two months in bourbon barrels, and an American style imperial stout. In early 2014, Almanac refocused its output on this category. By 2018 with the opening of its own brewery, Almanac was best known for its oak-aged sours and farmhouse ales, while also brewing IPAs, lagers, and pilsners.

The following is a partial list of Almanac beers past and present:

Series	Beer	Date	Ingredients	Source (all locations are in California)
California Table Beers
California Table Beers	Extra Pale Ale	Aug 2012	mandarin oranges	Blossom Bluff Farms (Reedley)
California Table Beers	Honey Saison	Aug 2012	honey	Marshall Farms (American Canyon)
California Table Beers	Biere de Chocolat	Jan 2013	Madagascar and Río Caribe cacao beans; Ivanhoe hops	Dandelion Chocolate (San Francisco)
Farm to Barrel
Farm to Barrel	Barrel Noir	Jan 2013		
Farm to Barrel	Farmer's Reserve No. 1 wild ale	Jan 2013	Cabernet Sauvignon, Muscat, and Concord grapes; plums	Alfieri Farms; Hamada Farms; Twin Girls Farm
Farm to Barrel	Farmer's Reserve No. 2	Jan 2013	heirloom pumpkins; Fuyu persimmons; ginger	La Tercera Farms (Bodega Bay); Hamada Farms (Kingsburg); Santa Clara Valley
Farm to Barrel	Farmer's Reserve No 3	May 2013	strawberries; Crimson Baby nectarines	Swanton Berry Farm; Blossom Bluff Farms
Farm to Barrel	Farmer's Reserve No. 4	May 2013	Cara Cara oranges, Meyer lemons, Buddha's Hand citrons	Hamada Farms (Kingsburg)
Farm to Barrel	Dogpatch Sour	July 2013	Rainier cherries, sourdough starter	
Farm to Barrel	Heirloom Pumpkin Barleywine	July 2013	heirloom pumpkins	La Tercera Farms (Bodega Bay)
Farm to Barrel	Oak-age beers (mostly sours)	2014- (released ~30 days)		
Special releases
Special releases	Summer 2010 Belgian-style Golden Ale		blackberries	Sebastopol Berry Farm
Special releases	Autumn 2011 Farmhouse Pale		San Joaquin Valley plums; organic wheat	Twin Girls Farm (Yettem); Massa Organics (Glenn County)
Special releases	Winter 2012 Winter Wit		San Joaquin Valley oranges; ginger root	Hamada Farm (Kingsburg); Mellow's Nursery (Morgan Hill)
Special releases	Spring 2012 Bière de Mars (French-style farmhouse ale)		organic baby fennel	Heirloom Organic Gardens (Hollister)
Special releases	Fairmont Hotel Honey Saison	April 2012	honey	Fairmont San Francisco hotel's rooftop apiary
Special releases	California Fresh Hop Ale (draft only)	Sept 2012	crystal malt	Grown by biology graduate student Graham Anderson on the Stanford University campus
Special releases	Single Origin Chinook IPA	Jan 2013	Chinook hops	Hops-Meister (Clearlake)
Special releases	Single Origin Cluster IPA	Jan 2013	Cluster hops	Hops-Meister (Clearlake)
Special releases	Single Origin Cascasde IPA	Jan 2013	Cascasde hops	Hops-Meister (Clearlake)
Special releases	Flowering Gose	Aug 2013	green coriander berries and flowers	Mariquita Farms (Watsonville)

== See also ==
- Barrel-aged beer
