= Observer Publishing Company =

Newspaper

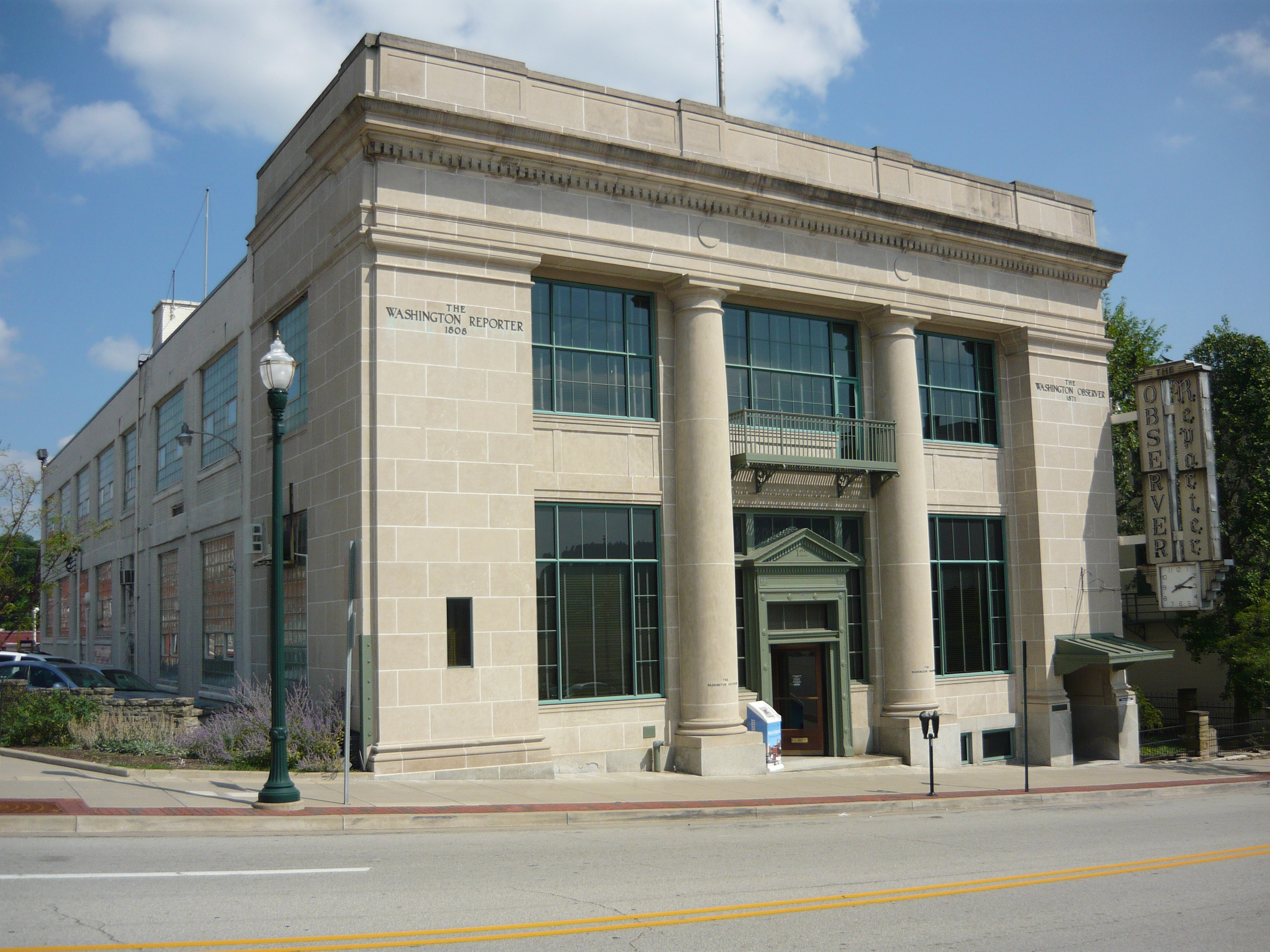
- Observer–Reporter Building
- Headquarters: Washington, Pennsylvania
- Website: observerpublishingcompany.com

Observer Publishing Company is a newspaper publishing company headquartered in Washington, Pennsylvania. The company publishes The Observer–Reporter, a daily newspaper covering Washington County, Greene County, and the Mon Valley in Pennsylvania, with some overlap into the South Hills of Pittsburgh in Allegheny County. Other publications include The Almanac, a weekly publication covering the South Hills and northern Washington County, and several niche publications and associated websites.

== History ==
=== 19th century ===
On August 15, 1808, The Reporter debuted as a weekly newspaper.

In 1833, two years after Sample's acquisition of the paper, he sold it to B.S. Stewart and George E. Acheson. The publication, originally a weekly paper, was eventually sold to Maj. Enos L. Christman in 1873. On August 4, 1876, Christman changed the name of the paper to The Daily Reporter and began publishing it every afternoon.

The Monthly Advance, founded by Horace B. Durant in 1871, was renamed the Weekly Advance within four months. In 1876, it was again renamed as The Washington Observer. The publication became a daily newspaper in 1889, owned by E.F. Acheson and Winfield McIlvaine. Acheson became the sole owner in 1890.

=== 20th century ===
The newspaper was bought by John L. (Jack) Stewart on July 24, 1902, and Acheson and Stewart formed the Observer Publishing Co. On January 1, 1903, the Observer Publishing Co. purchased The Reporter. The Washington Observer was published in the morning, and The Washington Reporter in the afternoon. Acheson retired in 1912, turning over ownership and the presidency to Stewart. When Stewart died in 1940, the company was turned over to his wife, Margaretta. Her grandsons John L.S. and William B. Northrop became co-owners and president and vice president, respectively, upon her death in May 1966.

In 1963, the company purchased The Waynesburg Republican. In 1967, the newspapers merged into the Observer–Reporter.

In 1981, the two newspapers merged into a morning-only paper. Also in 1981, the company bought controlling interest in The Advertiser and The Almanac from Richard Barnes and formed Cornerstone Publishing Co.

In 1982, Eleanor Vosburg sold The Burgettstown Enterprise to the company. Two years later, The Record-Outlook in McDonald was bought from Andrew Eiler and William Burns. The Democrat Messenger in Waynesburg and the Monongahela Daily Herald were bought in 1986. The Sunday Observer–Reporter was launched in April 1986.

The Advertiser and The Almanac were converted from tabloid-size to broadsheet in 1990. In 1998, the two newspapers merged into one, The Almanac, with two zoned editions.

A new color press was installed in June 1993. In that decade, circulation of the Observer–Reporter grew by 7,000 customers, to nearly 40,000. In 1995, the Burgettstown Enterprise and The Record-Outlook merged to form The Record-Enterprise.

=== 21st century ===
In addition to its daily and weekly newspapers and their related websites, the company also publishes monthly magazines and other special-interest publications.

Jack Stewart was one of the founding members of the organization, which held its first meeting and was housed in its infancy in the Observer Washington office. Stewart served as president of the organization for the first two years, the only person to serve two terms as president until 2004. The state presidency has also been held by John and Bill Northrop, as well as the late Jim Lyon, former Observer general manager and executive vice president.
