= Almanac (Pennsylvania) =

The Almanac
- Type: Weekly newspaper
- Owner: Observer Publishing Company
- Publisher: Observer Publishing Company
- Editor: Liz Rogers
- Founded: 1967
- Headquarters: Pittsburgh, PA, U.S.
- Website: https://www.thealmanac.net/

The Almanac is a weekly newspaper in the South Hills region of Pittsburgh and northern Washington County, Pennsylvania, USA. It is published by the Observer Publishing Company of Washington, Pennsylvania. It is delivered free of charge to most houses in its distribution area. On 18 May 2016, the Almanac covered Mt. Lebanon, Peters Township, Bethel Park, Upper St. Clair, South Fayette and outlying areas.

== History ==
The Almanac was established in 1967 to serve the South Hills of Pittsburgh. Observer Publishing Company bought a controlling interest in The Advertiser and The Almanac in 1981. In 1990, the newspapers were converted from tabloid-size to broadsheet. The two newspapers merged into The Almanac in 1998. In 2018, Observer Publishing's assets, including the Almanac where sold to Ogden Newspapers.
