= Persimmon =

Edible fruit

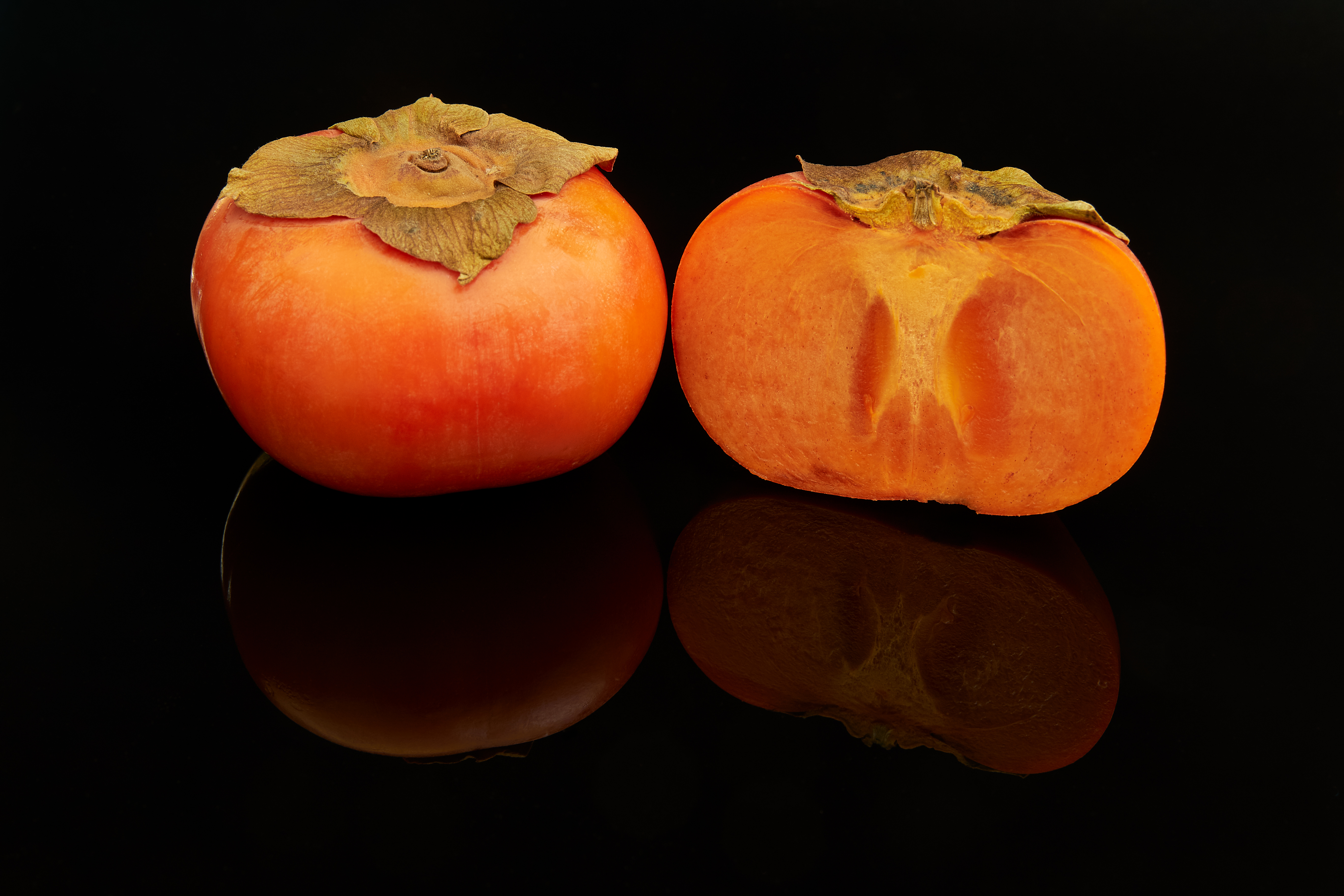
Oriental persimmon fruit, whole and halved, of the firm cultivar 'fuyu'

The persimmon (/pərˈsɪmən/) is the edible fruit of a number of species of trees in the genus Diospyros. The most widely cultivated of these is the Chinese, Korean, and Japanese kaki persimmon, Diospyros kaki. In 2023, China produced 80% of the world's persimmons.

== Description ==
Like the tomato, the persimmon is not a berry in the general culinary sense, but is one in the botanical sense due to its morphology as a single fleshy fruit derived from the ovary of a single flower. Diospyros kaki is the most widely cultivated species of persimmon.

Typically the tree reaches 4.5 to 18 metres (15 to 60 feet) in height and is round-topped. It usually stands erect, but sometimes can be crooked or have a willowy appearance. The leaves are 7–15 centimetres (3–6 inches) long, and are oblong in shape with brown-hairy petioles 2 cm (3/4 in) in length. They are leathery and glossy on the upper surface, brown and silky underneath. The leaves are deciduous and bluish-green in color. In autumn, they turn to yellow, orange, or red.

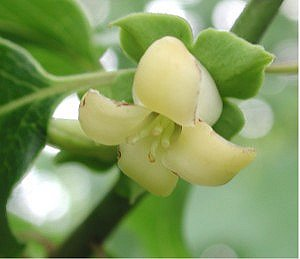
Female flower of American persimmon (D. virginiana)

Persimmon trees are typically dioecious, meaning male and female flowers are produced on separate trees. Some trees have both male and female flowers and in rare cases may bear a perfect flower, which contains both male and female reproductive organs in one flower. Male flowers are pink and appear in groups of three. They have a four-parted calyx, a corolla, and 24 stamens in two rows. Female flowers are creamy-white and appear singly. They have a large calyx, a four-parted, yellow corolla, eight undeveloped stamens, and a rounded ovary bearing the style and stigma. 'Perfect' flowers are a cross between the two.

Persimmon fruit matures late in the autumn and can stay on the tree until winter. In color, the ripe fruit of the cultivated strains range from glossy light yellow-orange to dark red-orange depending on the species and variety. They similarly vary in size from 1.5 to 9 cm (1/2 to 3 1/2 in) in diameter, and in shape the varieties may be spherical, acorn-, or pumpkin-shaped. The flesh is astringent until fully ripe and is yellow, orange, or dark-brown in color. The calyx generally remains attached to the fruit after harvesting, but becomes easy to remove once the fruit is ripe. The ripe fruit is high in sugars, mainly sucrose, fructose and glucose, and is sweet in taste.

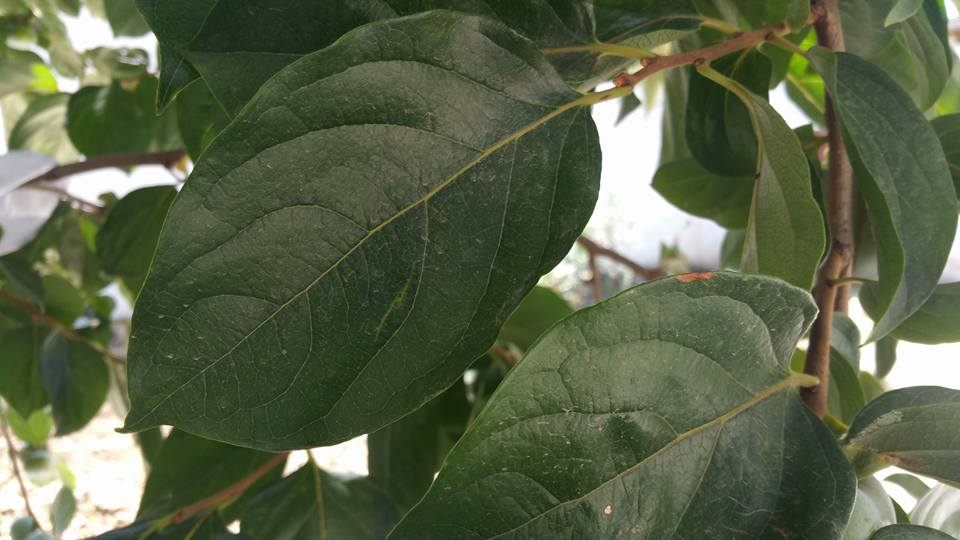
Persimmon leaves

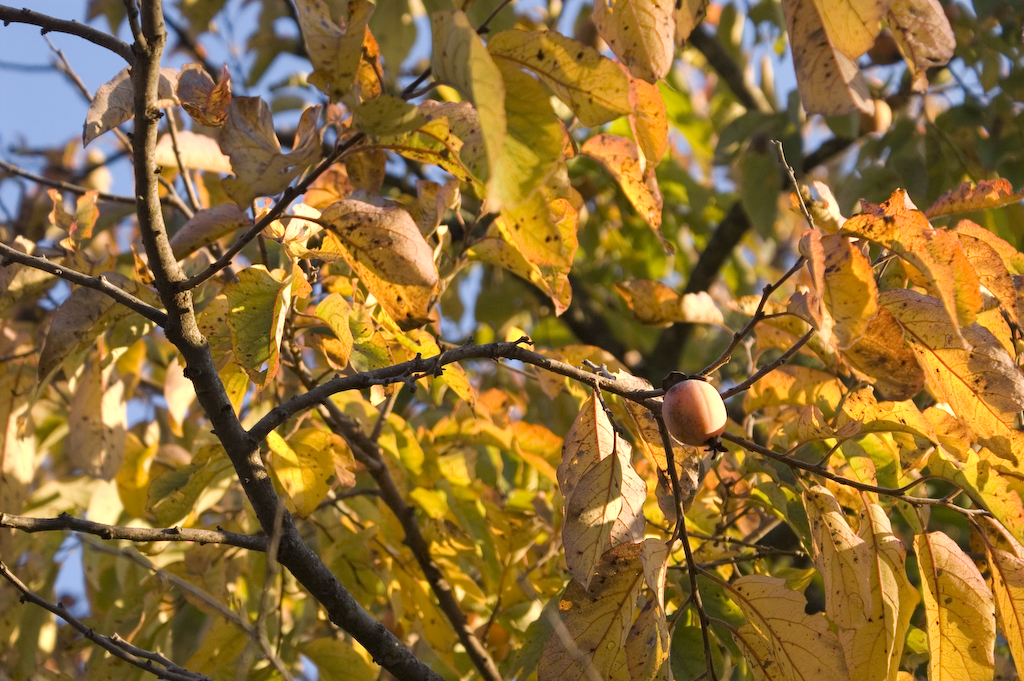
American persimmon leaves in autumn

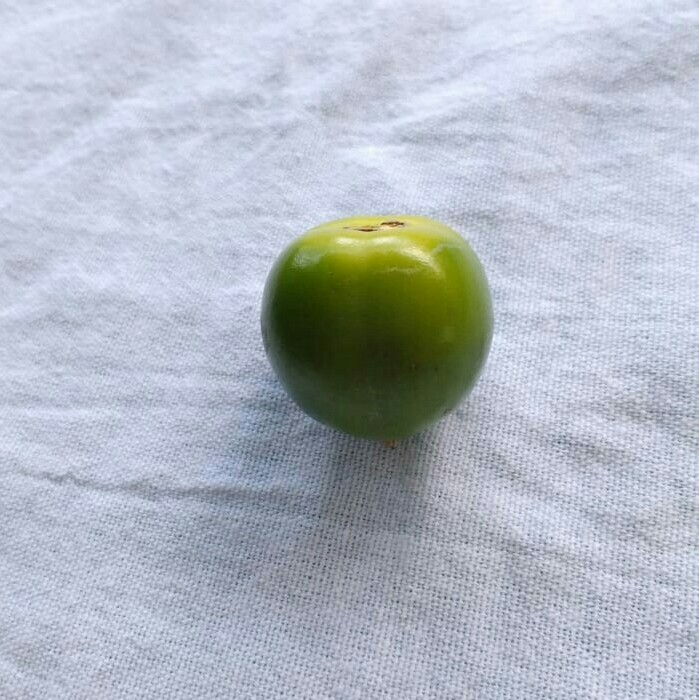
An unripe kaki persimmon

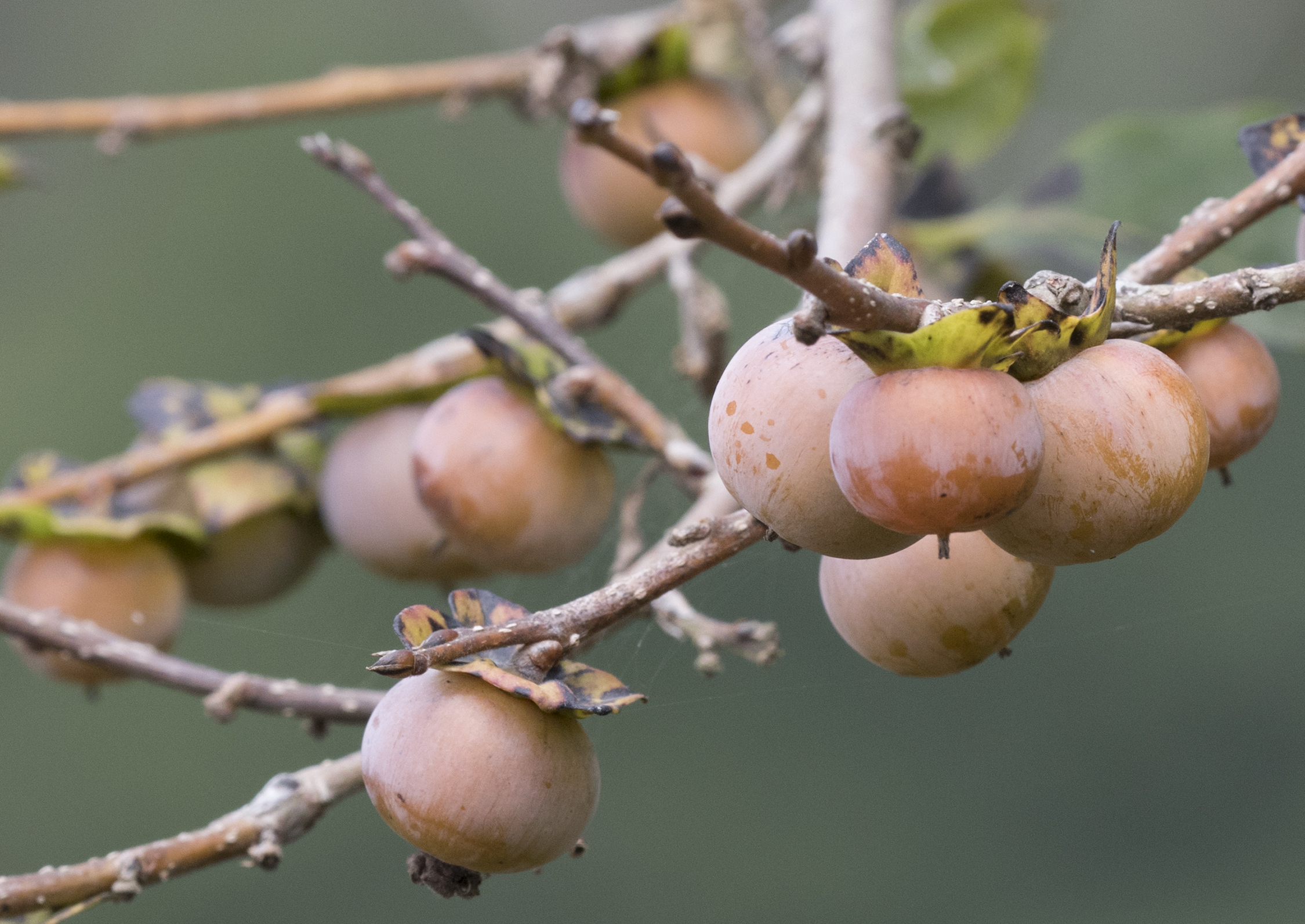
Lotus persimmon (D. lotus) fruit on branch

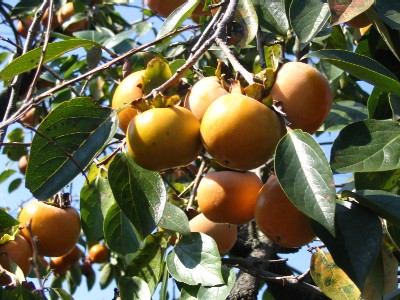
Ripe kaki persimmons

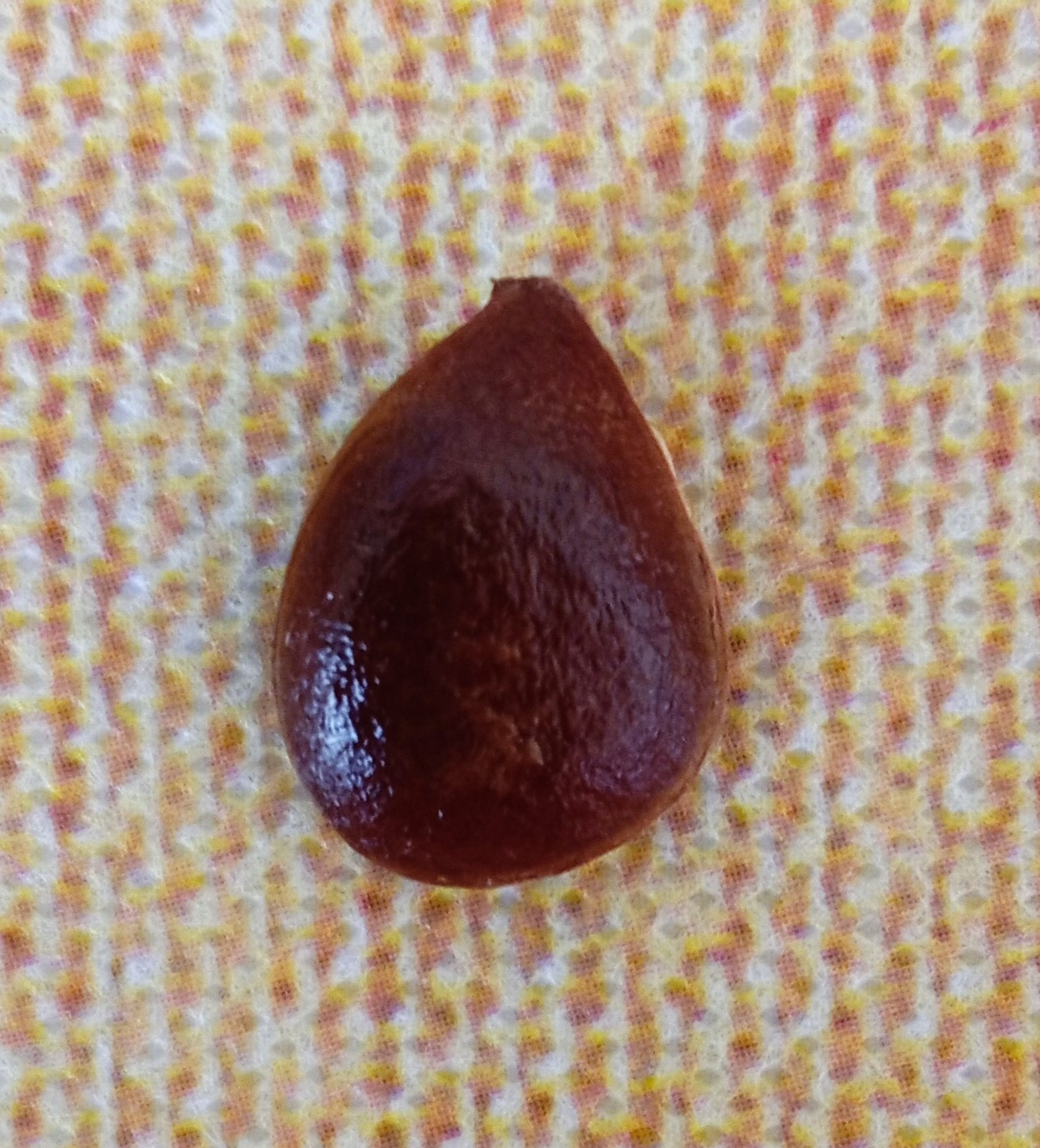
Persimmon fruit seed

=== Chemistry ===
Persimmon fruits contain the phytochemicals catechin, gallocatechin, and betulinic acid.

== Taxonomy ==
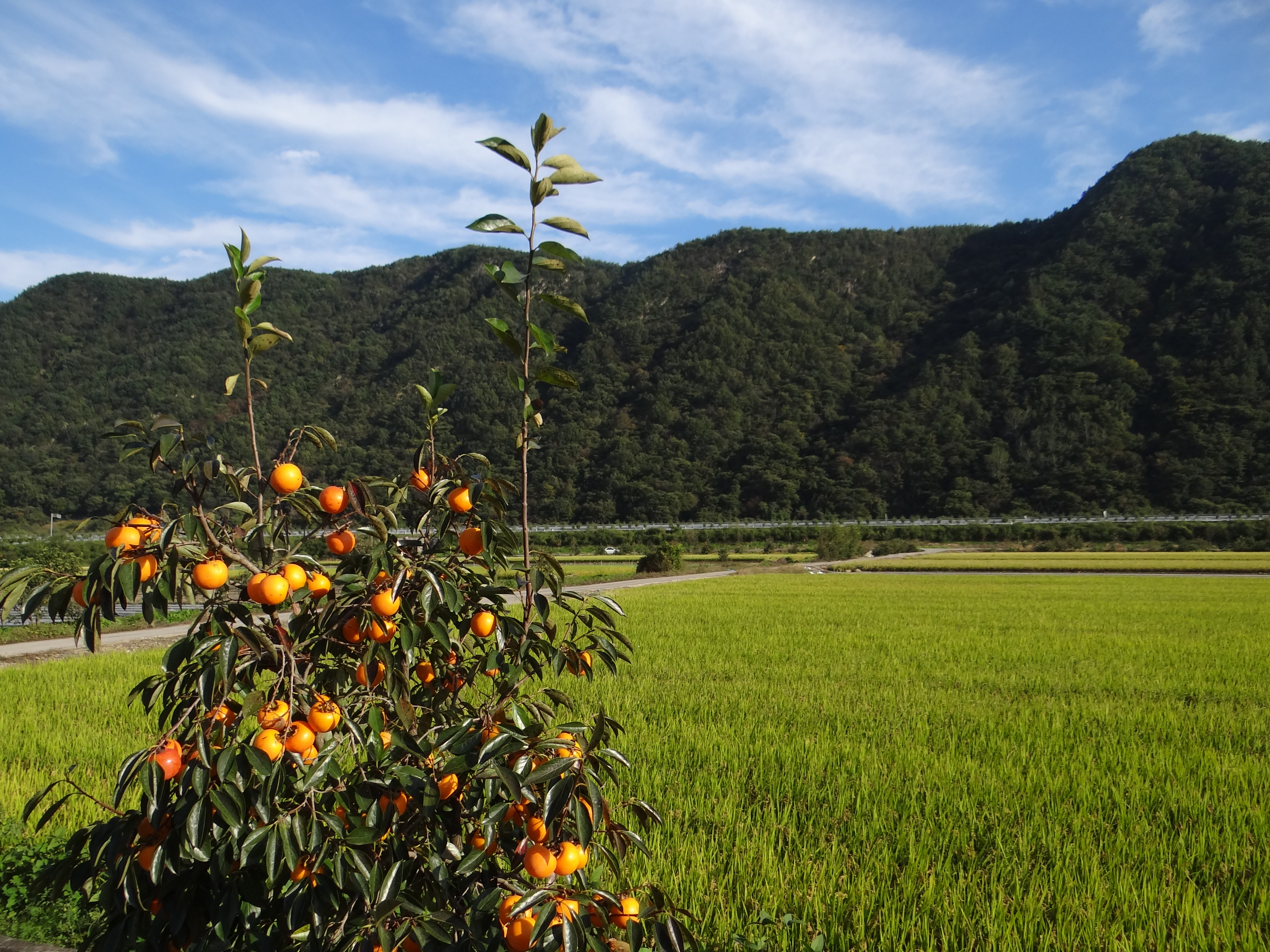
Oriental persimmon tree with fruit – Wanju County, South Korea

=== Selected species ===
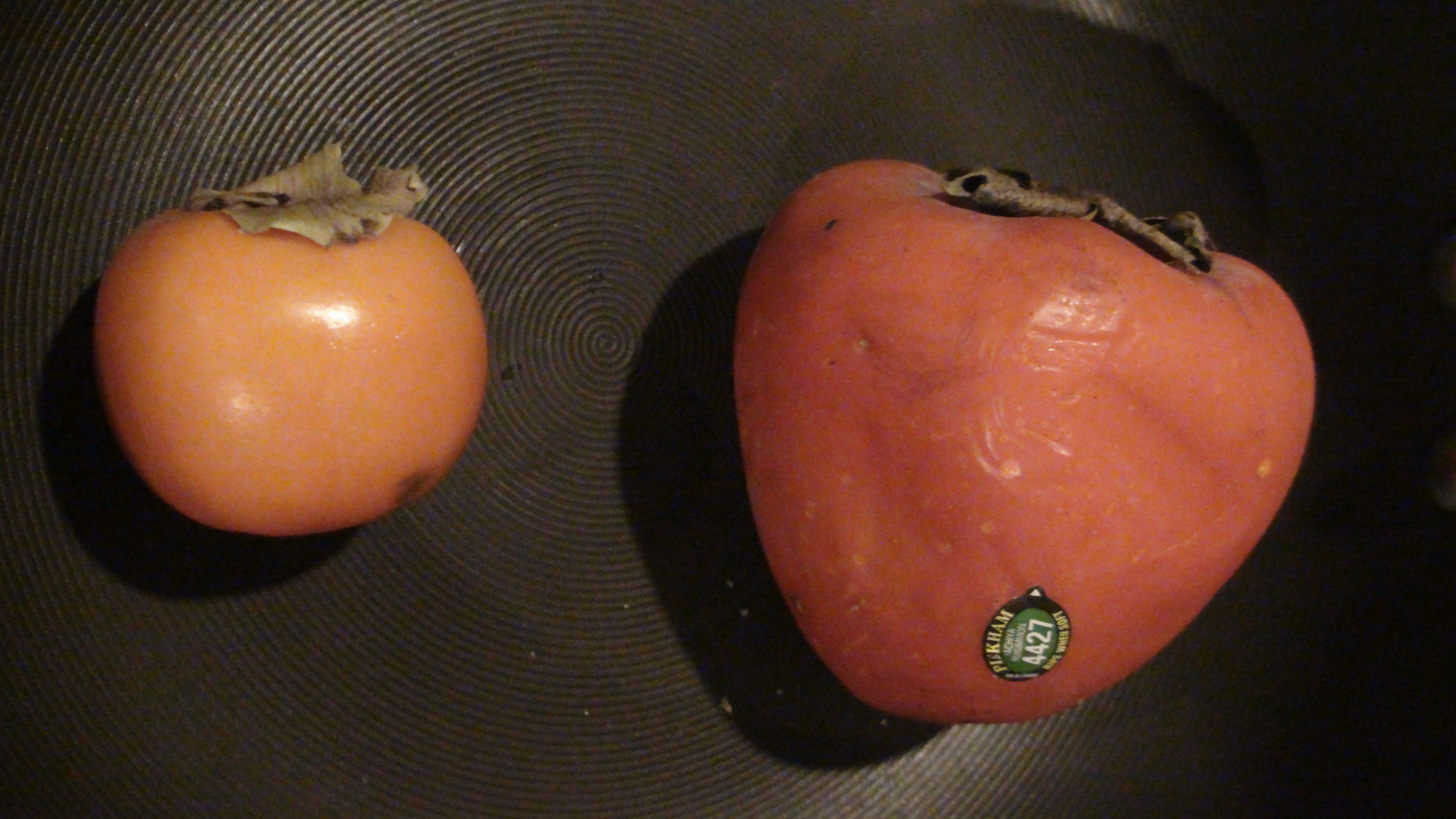
Comparison of 'Jiro' and 'Hachiya' cultivar kaki persimmon size

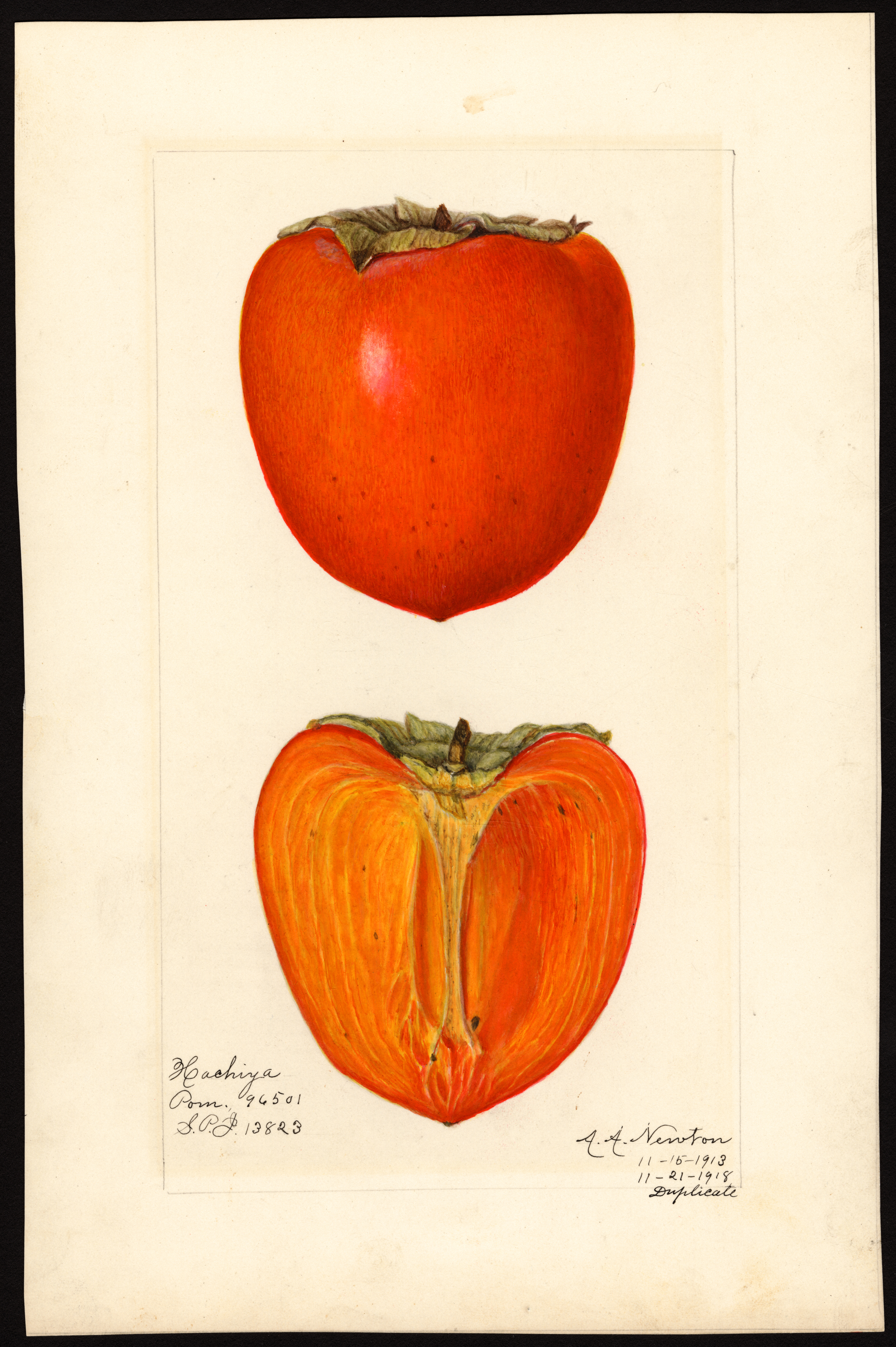
Japanese persimmon (cultivar 'Hachiya') from the Pomological Watercolor Collection, 1913

While many species of Diospyros bear fruit inedible to humans or only occasionally gathered, the following are grown for their edible fruit:

==== Diospyros kaki (Oriental persimmon) ====
Oriental persimmon, Chinese persimmon, or Japanese persimmon (Diospyros kaki) is the most commercially important persimmon. It is native to China, Northeast India, Bangladesh, and northern Indochina. It was first cultivated in China more than 2,000 years ago and introduced to Japan in the 7th century and to Korea in the 14th century. China, Japan, and South Korea are also the top producers of persimmons. It is known as shì (柿) in Chinese, kaki (柿) in Japanese, and gam (감) in Korean, and it is also called a Korean mango. Known as haluwabed (हलुवाबेद) in Nepal, where it is one of the most popular seasonal fruits, the persimmon has a long history and is used for various culinary purposes. It was introduced to California and southern Europe in the 1800s and to the State of São Paulo, Brazil, in the 1890s, afterwards spreading across the country with the Japanese immigrants. The State of São Paulo is still the largest producer within Brazil with an area of 3,610 hectares (8,900 acres) dedicated to persimmon culture in 2003. Persimmon trees are deciduous with broad, stiff leaves. The fruit is sweet and slightly tangy with a soft to occasionally fibrous texture.

===== Varieties =====
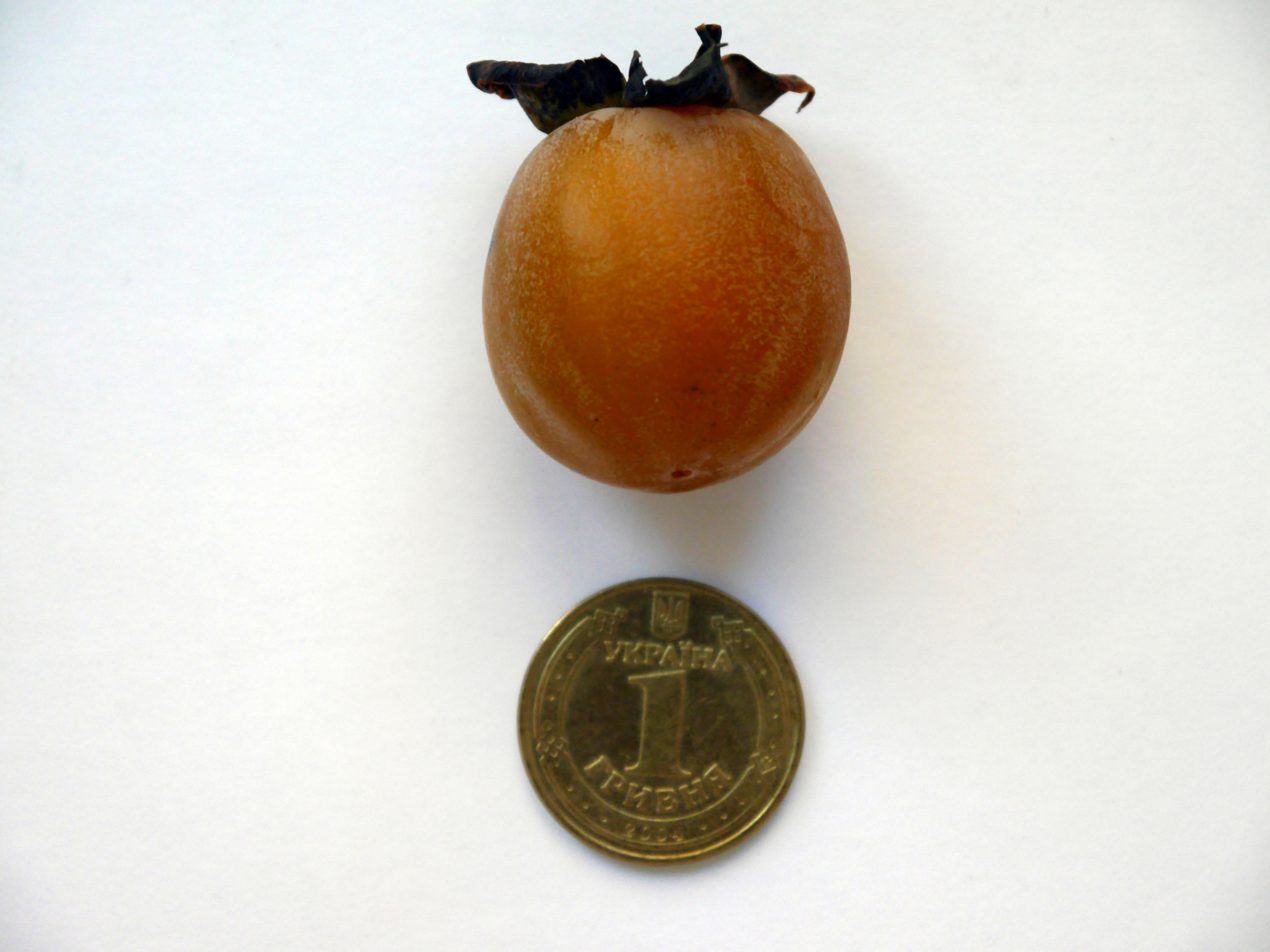
Diospyros lotus fruit

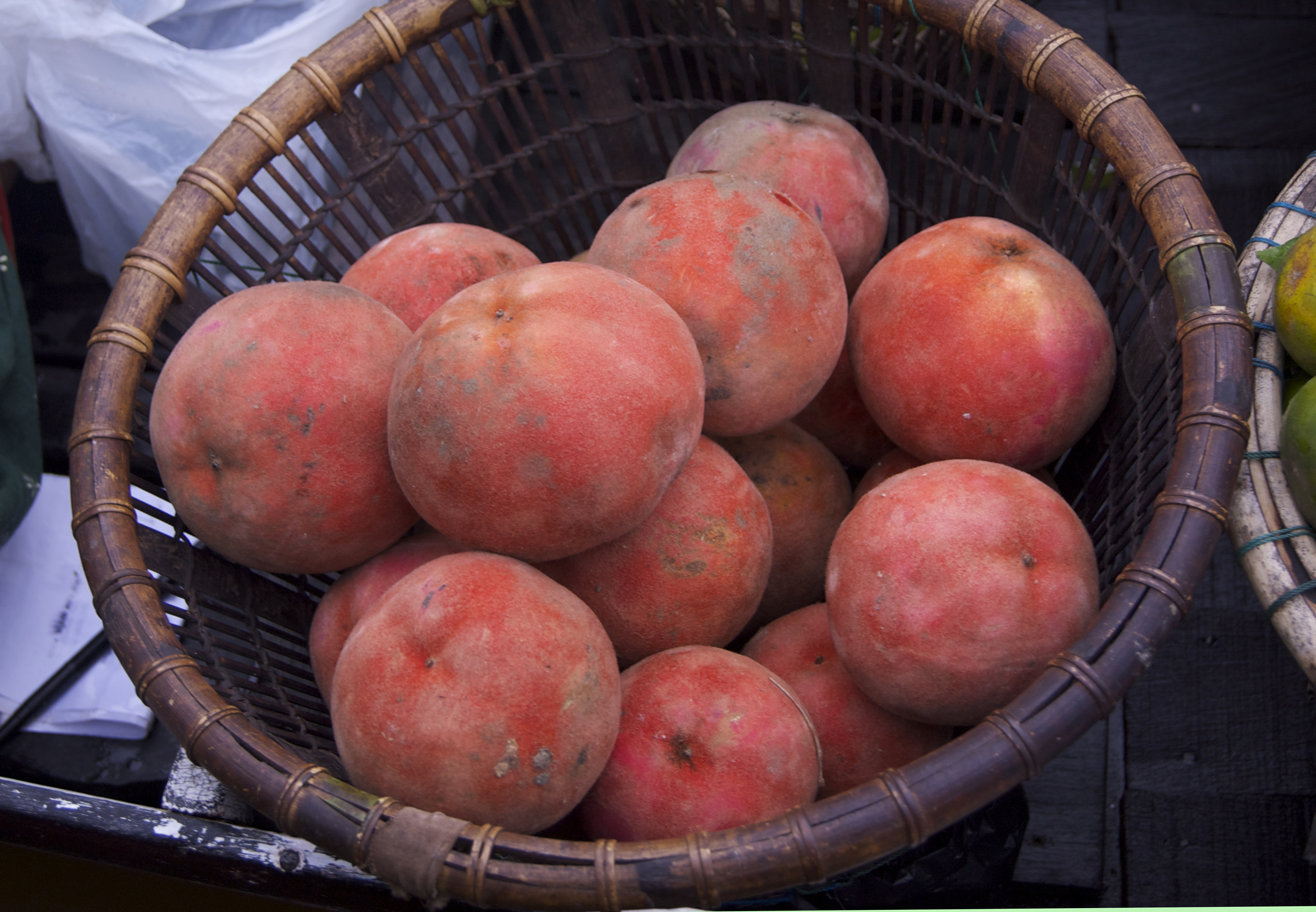
Velvet-apples in South Kalimantan

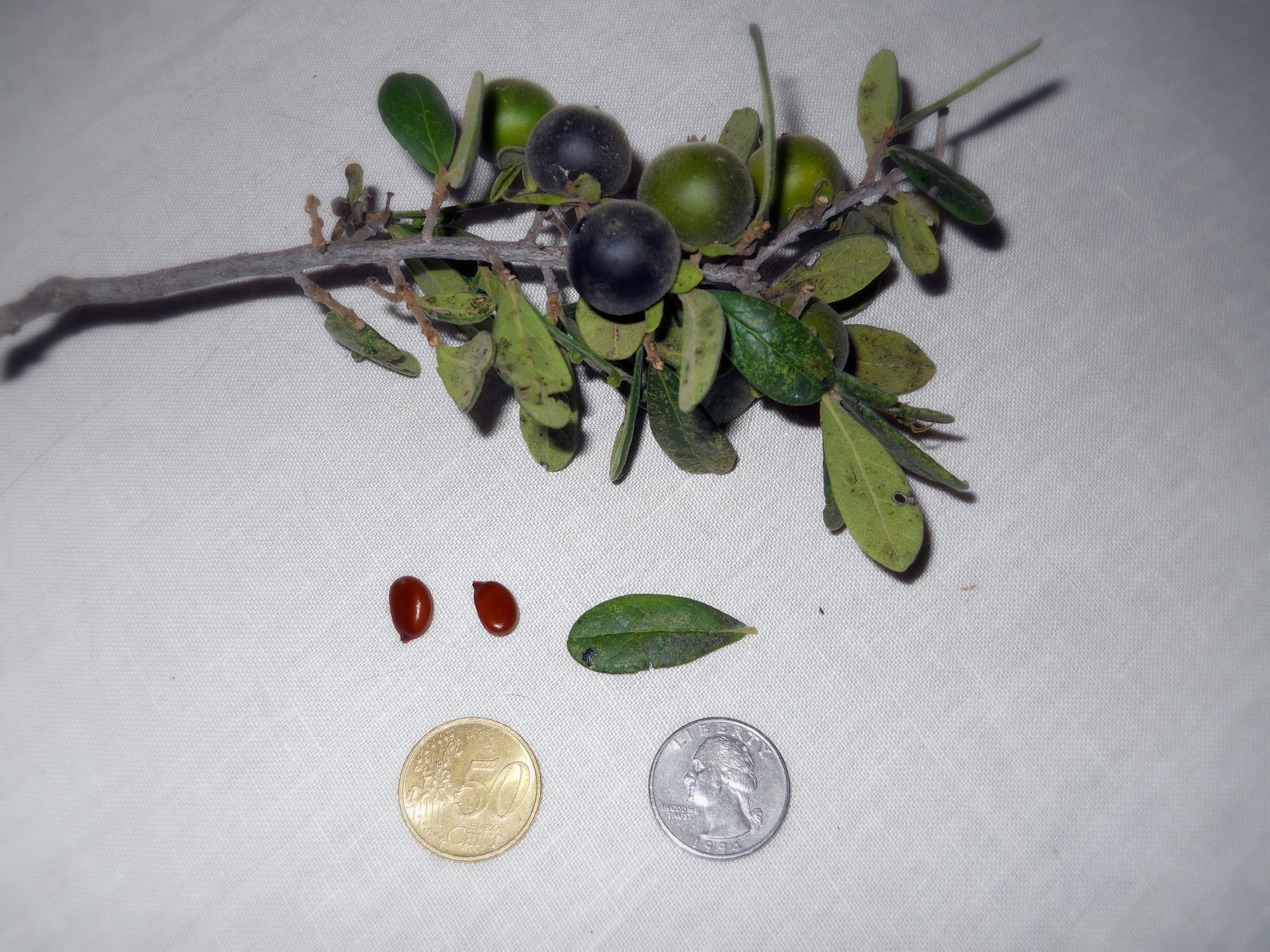
D. texana (Texas persimmon)

There are numerous cultivars of the persimmon. Some varieties are edible in the crisp, firm state, but others have the best flavor when allowed to rest and soften slightly after harvest. The Japanese cultivar Hachiya is widely grown. The fruit has a high tannin content, which makes the unripe fruit astringent and bitter, but the tannin levels reduce as the fruit matures. Persimmons like Hachiya must be completely ripened before consumption. When ripe, this fruit consists of thick, pulpy jelly encased in a waxy thin-skinned shell.

Commercially and in general, there are two types of persimmon fruit: astringent and non-astringent.

The heart-shaped Hachiya is the most common variety of astringent persimmon. Astringent persimmons contain high levels of soluble tannins and are unpalatable if eaten before completely softened. The astringency of tannins is removed in various ways. Examples include ripening by exposure to light for several days and wrapping the fruit in paper (probably because this increases the ethylene concentration of the surrounding air). Ethylene can increase the speed and evenness of the ripening process by adding ethylene gas to the atmosphere in which the fruit is stored. For domestic purposes the most convenient and effective method is to store the persimmons in a clean, dry container together with other varieties of ripening fruit that give off particularly large quantities of ethylene; apples and related fruits such as pears are effective, as well as bananas.

Other chemicals are used commercially in the artificial ripening of persimmons or for delaying their ripening. Examples include alcohol and carbon dioxide, which change tannin into the insoluble form. Such bletting processes sometimes are jump-started by exposing the fruit to cold or frost. The resultant cell damage stimulates the release of ethylene which promotes cellular wall breakdown. Astringent varieties of persimmons also can be prepared for commercial purposes by drying. Tanenashi persimmons will occasionally contain a seed or two, which can be planted and will yield a larger, more vertical tree than when merely grafted onto the D. virginiana rootstock most commonly used in the U.S. Such seedlings may produce fruit with more seeds, usually six to eight per fruit, and the fruit itself may vary slightly from that of the parent tree. Seedlings are said to be more susceptible to root nematodes.

The non-astringent persimmon is squat like a tomato and is most commonly sold as Fuyu. Non-astringent persimmons are not actually free of tannins as the term suggests, rather they are far less astringent before ripening and lose more of their tannic quality sooner. Non-astringent persimmons may be consumed when still firm and remain edible when soft.

There is a less commonly available third type, the pollination-variant non-astringent persimmon. When fully pollinated, the flesh of this fruit is brown inside—known as goma in Japan—and the fruit can be eaten when firm. These varieties are highly sought after. Tsurunoko, sold as "chocolate persimmon" for its dark brown flesh; Maru, sold as "cinnamon persimmon" for its spicy flavor; and Hyakume, sold as "brown sugar", are the three best known.

- Astringent
  - 'Dōjō hachiya' (ja: 堂上蜂屋)
  - Giombo, large fruits. Pollination-variant
  - Hachiya, (ja: 蜂屋), 'Kōshū hyakume' (ja: 甲州百目), 'Fuji' (ja: 富士) cone-shaped and bright orange
  - Hongsi (Korean: 홍시)
  - Ormond, (also known as Christmas Persimmon) long conical fruit
  - Saijō, (ja: 西条) sweet conical fruit
  - Sheng
  - Tanenashi, orange fruit which keeps well on the tree
    - 'Hiratanenashi,' (ja: 平核無) major commercial variety in Japan
    - 'Tone wase' (ja: 刀根早生)
  - Tamopan, large and flat. Has a ring around the middle
  - Maru, (cinnamon)
  - Tsurunoko, (chocolate)
  - Tipo, Italian variety
  - Cioccolatino
  - Fankio, produced large golden fruit
  - Eureka, medium-sized flat red fruit
  - Hyakume, (brown sugar)
    - Yomato Hyakume, pollination variant with large fruit
  - Gosho, (giant Fuyu) also known as Gosho-gaki. Seeded fruit has darker flesh and better flavor
  - Great Wall, Chinese variant with medium-sized, orange fruit
  - Sheng, squat medium to large fruit with a gelatinous texture
  - Triumph, sweet, small, square fruit
  - Rojo Brillante, Spanish variety
  - Ribera Sun, Spanish variety derived from the Rojo Brillante. Earlier ripening than Rojo Brillante
  - Nishumura Wase, pollination variant and early ripening
  - Gailey, small-medium fruit
- Non-astringent
  - Dan gam (Korean, 단감)
  - Fuyū, (ja: 富有) medium-sized flattened orange-colored fruit. Easily damaged by frost
    - Matsumoto Wase Fuyu, bud sport of Fuyu. Heavy bearing and early ripening
  - 'Hanagosho,' (ja: 花御所) large tree with good crop regulation
  - Shogatsu, similar to Hanagosho
  - Izu, (ja: 伊豆) medium fruit. More cold hardy than Fuyu. Early to ripen
  - Jirō, (ja: 次郎柿) medium to large fruit. Yield is unpredictable when trees are young
    - Ichikikei Jiro, bud sport of Jiro. Medium-large fruit
    - Maekawa Jiro, bud sport of Jiro. Large oblate fruit
  - 'Sōshū' (ja: 早秋)
  - 'Taishū' (ja: 太秋)
  - Vainiglia, traditional variety from the Campania region of Italy. Yellow-orange with the taste of vanilla
  - Midia, large fruit with an indented ring
  - Suruga, sweet and spicy fruit. Late ripening
  - California Fuyu, also known as Cal-Fuyu and often marketed as Fuyu
  - Hana Fuyu, grown in California and marketed as Giant Fuyu. Large but not flavorful
  - California Maru, grown in California as Jiro for years. Excellent eating quality
  - Fuji, grown in California and Japan. Marketed as Hachiya in Japan
  - Zenji Maru, old variety with a deep red color when ripe

==== Diospyros lotus (date-plum) ====
Date-plum (Diospyros lotus), also known as lotus persimmon, is native to temperate Asia and southeast Europe. Its English name probably derives from the Persian Khormaloo خرمالو ("date-plum"), referring to the taste which is reminiscent of both plums and dates.

==== Diospyros decandra (gold apple or thị) ====
Diospyros decandra is native to Mainland Southeast Asia, and its skin is golden yellow.

==== Diospyros virginiana (American persimmon) ====
American persimmon (Diospyros virginiana) is native to the eastern United States. Harvested in the fall or after the first frost, the fruit is eaten fresh, in baked goods, in steamed puddings, and is used to make a mildly alcoholic beverage called persimmon beer.

===== Varieties =====
- Prok
- Killen
- Claypool
- I-115
- Dollywood
- 100-42
- 100-43
- 100-45
- Early Golden
- John Rick
- C-100
- JF-I

==== D. virginiana x D. kaki (Hybrid persimmon) ====
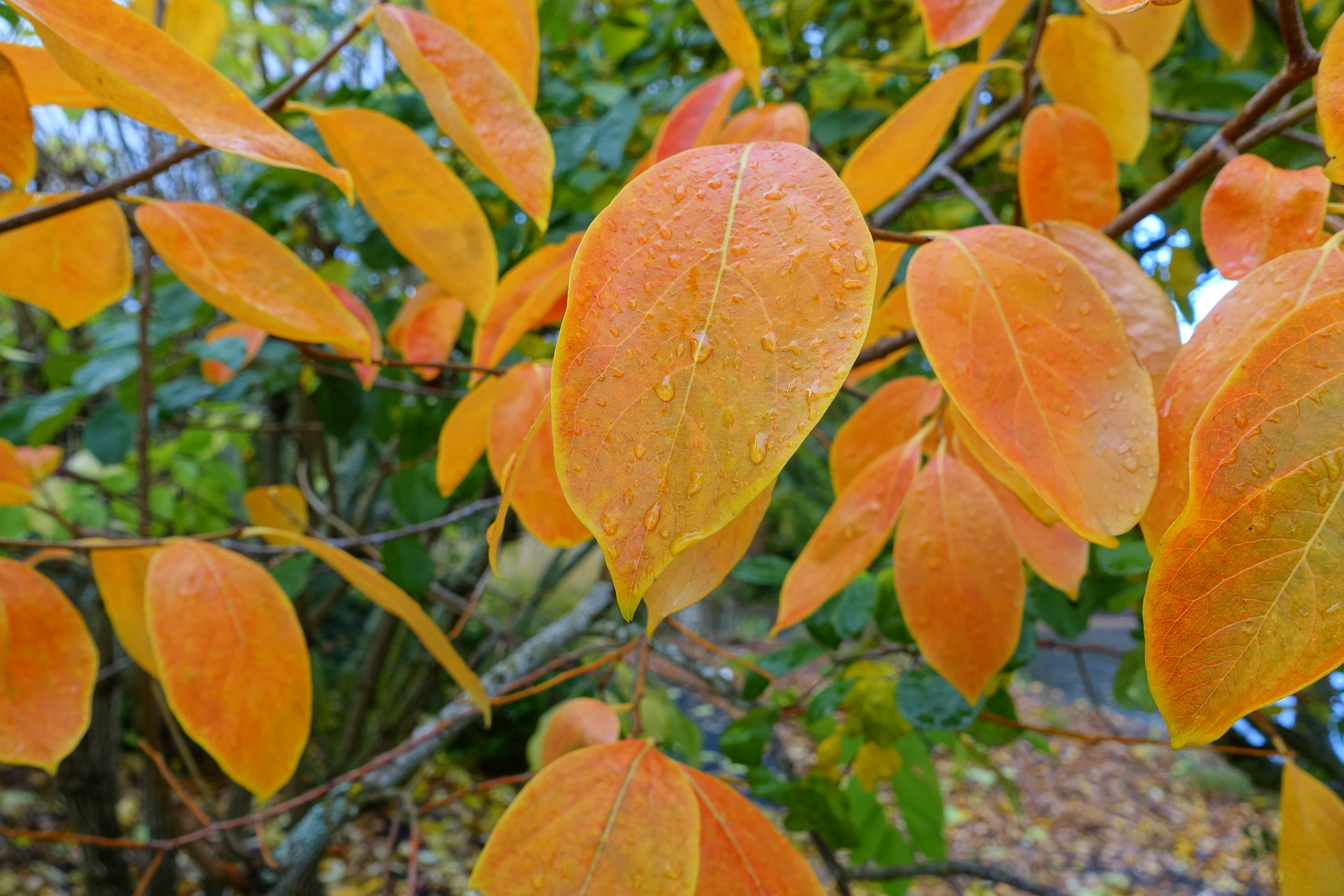
Hybrid cultivar "Nikita's Gift" leaves in fall.

Hybrid persimmons were first successfully bred at Nikitsky Botanical Garden, Crimea in 1948. The primary objective of hybridization is to obtain the higher cold-tolerance of D. virginiana and the larger fruit size of D. kaki. Certain cultivars have proven tolerance to –24 °C and obtain fruit weights of over 100 g.

===== Varieties =====
- Rosseyanka
- Nikita's Gift
- Kasandra
- Mikkusu
- Chuchupaka
- Zima Khurma
- Dar Sofiivky
- Bozhyi Dar
- Gora Goverla
- Gora Roman Kosh
- Gora Rodzhers

==== Diospyros blancoi (velvet persimmon) ====
The Mabolo or velvet-apple (Diospyros blancoi; syn. Diospyros discolor) is native to Taiwan, the Philippines, and Borneo, Indonesia.

==== Diospyros texana (Texas persimmon) ====
Texas persimmon (Diospyros texana) is native to central and west Texas and southwest Oklahoma in the United States, and eastern Chihuahua, Coahuila, Nuevo León, and Tamaulipas in northeastern Mexico. The fruit of D. texana are black, subglobose berries with a diameter of 1.5–2.5 cm (5/8–1 in) that ripen in August. The fleshy berries become edible when they turn dark purple or black, at which point they are sweet and can be eaten from the hand or made into pudding or custard.

=== Etymology ===
The word persimmon is derived from putchamin, pasiminan, pechimin or pessamin, from Powhatan, an Algonquian language of the southern and eastern United States, meaning "a dry fruit". Other sources have suggested that the word "persimmon" comes from a Persian word meaning date-plum. It was first used in English in the early 17th century.

== Cultivation ==
Persimmon production 2023, millions of tonnes
| China | 4.06 |
| South Korea | 0.24 |
| Japan | 0.19 |
| Azerbaijan | 0.19 |
| Brazil | 0.17 |
| World | 5.07 |
Source: FAOSTAT of the United Nations

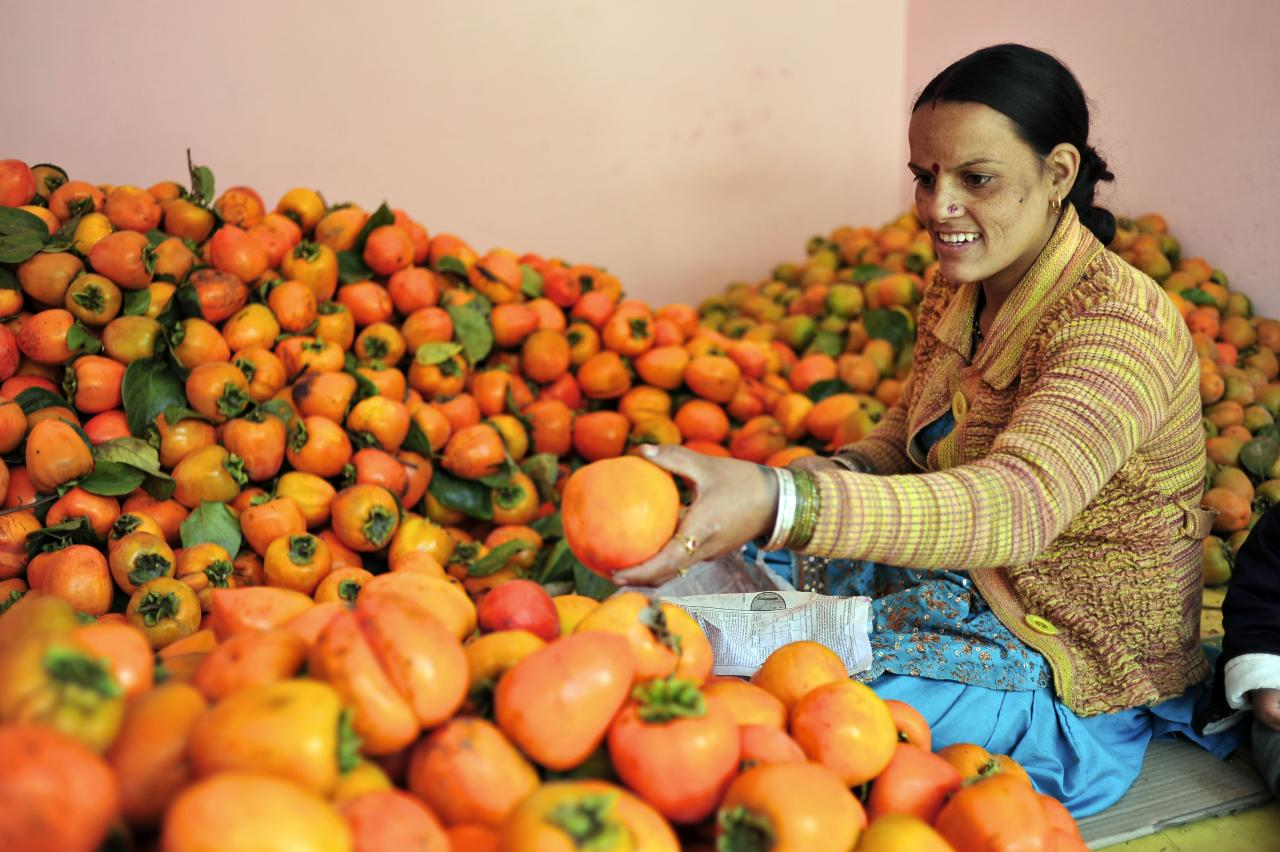
Persimmons for sale at a fruit market in Kullu, Himachal Pradesh, India.

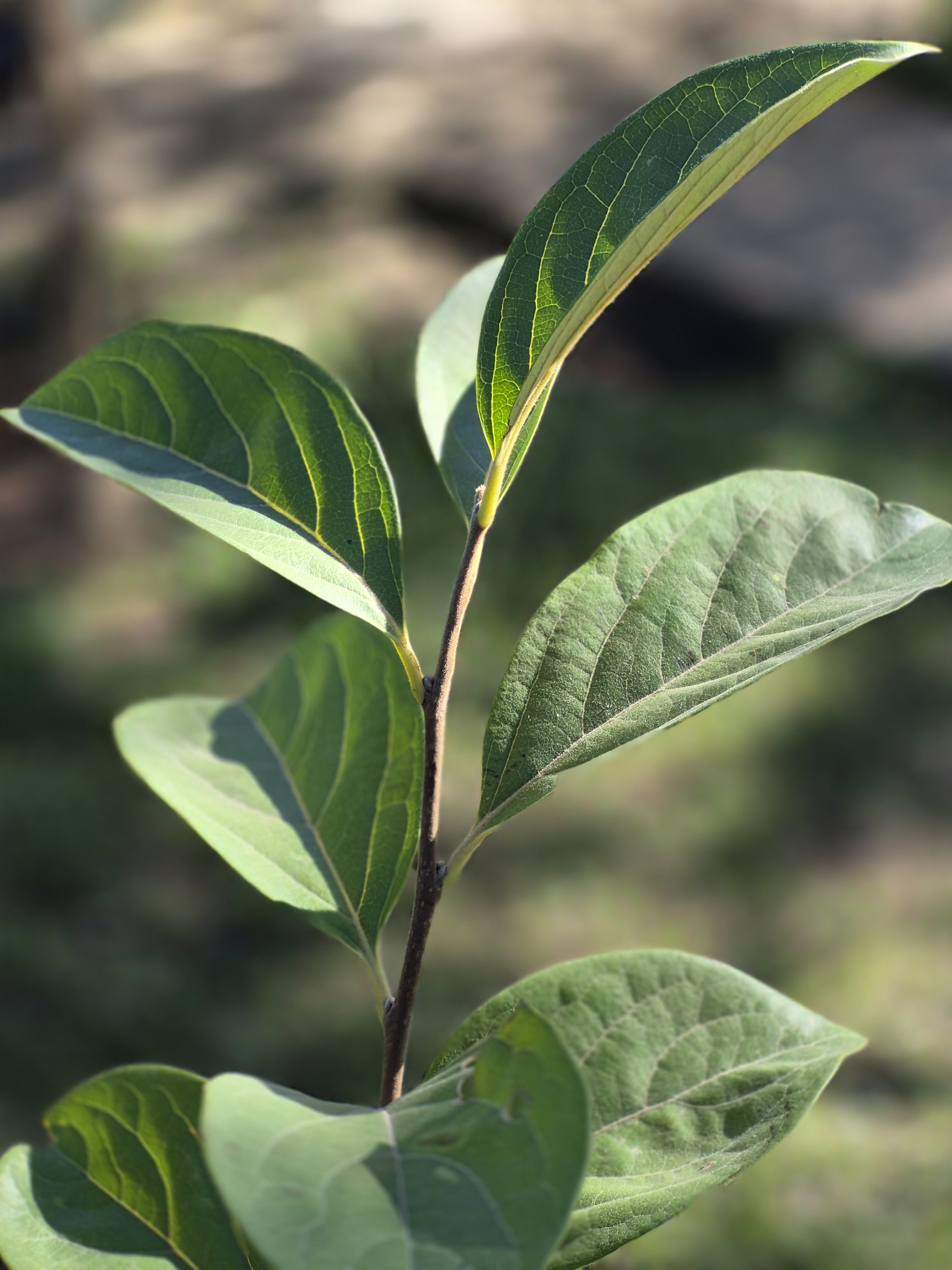
Leaves of D. kaki cultivated in Brazil

In 2023, world production of persimmons was 5 million tonnes, led by China with 80% of the total (table).

On the basis of yield, Israel was the most productive country in 2023, producing 27,778 kg (61,240 lb) per hectare (ha, or 2.5 acres) followed by Uzbekistan with 23,062 kg (50,843 lb) per ha, compared to the world average of 4,086 kg (9,008 lb) per ha.

In China, the Taiqiu persimmon variety yields approximately 30 tonnes of fruit per hectare per year at full production.

=== Australia ===
The persimmon was introduced to Australia by Chinese immigrants in the 1850s. Only astringent varieties were cultivated until the introduction of non-astringent varieties from Japan in the 1970s. In 2022, the vast majority of persimmons sold domestically in Australia were non-astringent varieties.

=== Azerbaijan ===
Persimmons are one of Azerbaijan's most important non-petroleum exports. The main export markets are Russia, Ukraine, Belarus, Iran, Kazakhstan and the United Arab Emirates.

=== India ===
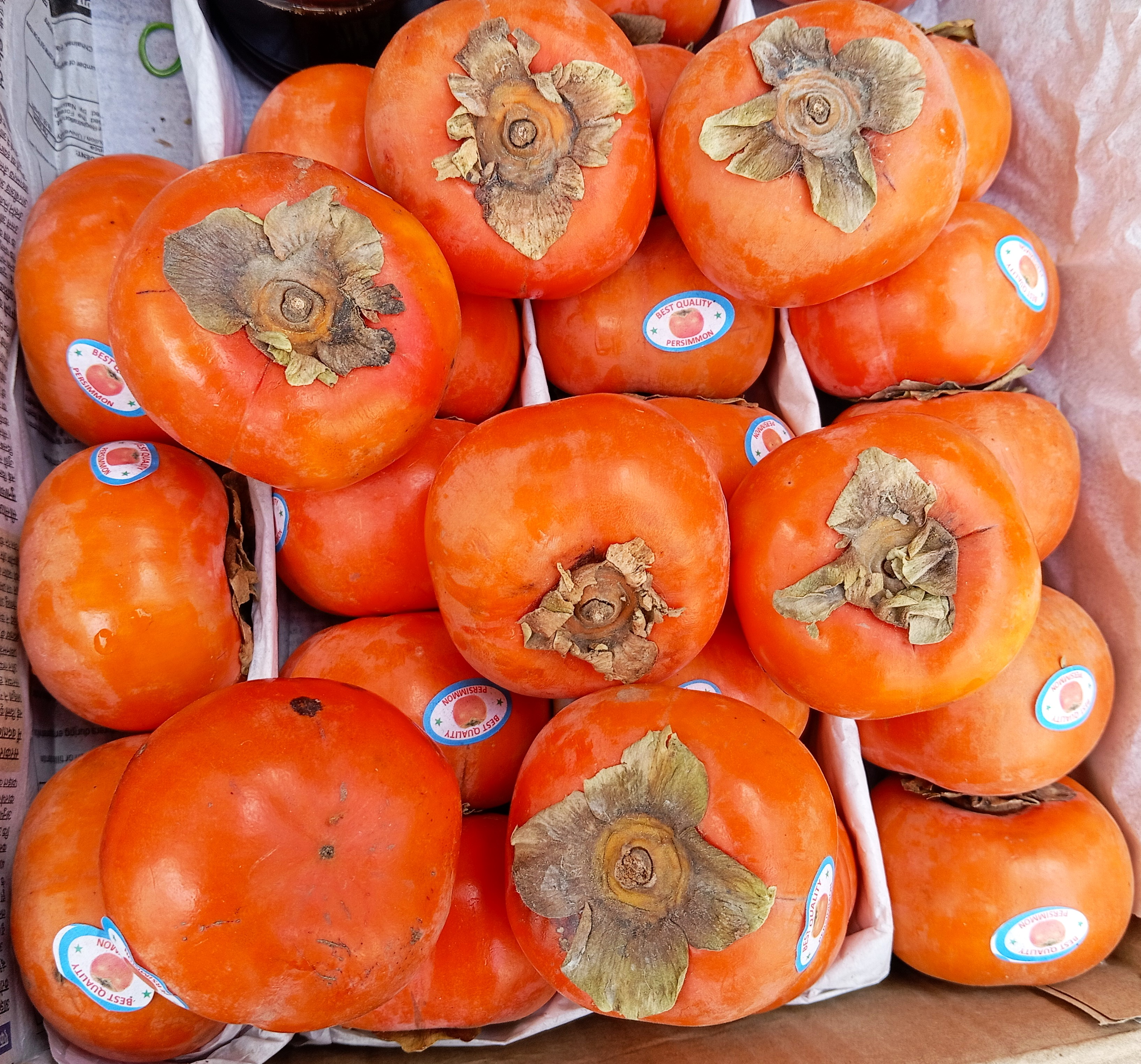
Persimmons for sale, Kolkata, West Bengal, India

Persimmons have various local names across India, including japani phal or amar phal in Uttar Pradesh, amlok in Assam, lukum in Manipur, and Seemai Panichai in Tamilnadu. They are grown in Jammu & Kashmir, Himachal Pradesh, Tamil Nadu, Uttarakhand, Sikkim, Darjeeling Region of West Bengal & Arunachal Pradesh.

=== Israel ===
The primary variety produced in Israel is the Sharon fruit. Israel produces 30,000 tonnes (33,000 short tons) of Sharon fruit a year.

"Sharon fruit" (named after the Sharon plain in Israel) is the marketing name for the Israeli-bred cultivar 'Triumph'. As with most commercial pollination-variant-astringent persimmons, the fruit are ripened off the tree by exposing them to carbon dioxide. The "sharon fruit" has no core, is seedless and particularly sweet, and can be eaten in its entirety, except for the stalk.

=== Spain ===
The primary variety produced in Spain is the Rojo Brillante. Spain produces 400,000 tonnes (440,000 short tons) of Rojo Brillante a year.

In the Valencia region of Spain, there is a production area of kaki called the "Ribera del Xùquer" which has a protected label and where only persimmons of the variety "Rojo Brillante" or derived mutations are cultivated. The largest part of these astringent type persimmons are CO_{2} treated to remove astringency and marketed as "Persimon" with one "m", which is a registered trademark.

=== Taiwan ===
Persimmon growing in Taiwan peaked at 5,300 ha (13,000 acres) but declined to 4,700 ha (12,000 acres) by 2024 largely due to the impacts of typhoons and climate change on production. Most Taiwanese persimmons are consumed domestically with dried persimmons especially favored.

=== United States ===
California produces 10,000 short tons (9,100 t) of Fuyu a year. Most persimmons produced in California are seedless. California and Florida account for most commercial production. The first commercial orchards in Florida were planted in the 1870s and production peaked in the 1990s before declining. Most persimmon orchards in the US are small scale (70% less than 1 acre or 0.5 hectares and 90% less than 5 acres or 2 hectares).

=== Brazil ===
The state of São Paulo is the largest caqui producer in Brazil, leading the country to produce about 177,610 tons (196,000 short tons) in an 8,110 ha (20,000 acres). The national production averaged 21,900 kg per ha (19,500 lb per acre) in 2024. The Fuyu, Giambo and Tsurunoko are the most common cultivates varieties in the country.

== Toxicity ==
Unripe persimmons contain the soluble tannin shibuol, which, upon contact with a weak acid, polymerizes in the stomach and forms a gluey coagulum, a "foodball" or phytobezoar, that can affix with other stomach matter. These phytobezoars are often hard and almost woody in consistency. More than 85% of phytobezoars are caused by ingestion of unripened persimmons. Persimmon bezoars (diospyrobezoars) often occur in epidemics in regions where the fruit is grown.

== Nutrition ==
Japanese persimmons, raw Diospyros kaki
Nutritional value per 100 g (3.5 oz)
- Energy: 293 kJ (70 kcal)
- Carbohydrates: 18.59 g
- Sugars: 12.53 g
- Dietary fiber: 3.6 g
- Fat: 0.19 g
- Protein: 0.58 g
Vitamins and minerals
| Vitamins | Quantity %DV^{†} |
| Vitamin A equiv. beta-Carotene lutein zeaxanthin | 9% 81 μg 2% 253 μg 834 μg |
| Thiamine (B1) | 3% 0.03 mg |
| Riboflavin (B2) | 2% 0.02 mg |
| Niacin (B3) | 1% 0.1 mg |
| Vitamin B6 | 6% 0.1 mg |
| Folate (B9) | 2% 8 μg |
| Choline | 1% 7.6 mg |
| Vitamin C | 8% 7.5 mg |
| Vitamin E | 5% 0.73 mg |
| Vitamin K | 2% 2.6 μg |
| Minerals | Quantity %DV^{†} |
| Calcium | 1% 8 mg |
| Iron | 1% 0.15 mg |
| Magnesium | 2% 9 mg |
| Manganese | 15% 0.355 mg |
| Phosphorus | 1% 17 mg |
| Potassium | 5% 161 mg |
| Sodium | 0% 1 mg |
| Zinc | 1% 0.11 mg |
- Other constituents: Quantity
- Water: 80.3 g
- Link to USDA Database entry
- ^{†}Percentages estimated using US recommendations for adults, except for potassium, which is estimated based on expert recommendation from the National Academies.

A raw Japanese persimmon is 80% water and 19% carbohydrates, with negligible content of protein and fat (table). In a reference amount of 100 g (3.5 oz), a raw persimmon supplies 70 calories and is a moderate source (15% of the Daily Value) of manganese, with no other micronutrients in significant content (table).

Persimmons have higher levels of dietary fiber and some dietary minerals than apples.

== Uses ==
Persimmons are eaten fresh, dried, raw or cooked. When eaten fresh, they are usually eaten whole like an apple in bite-size slices and may be peeled, although the skin is edible. One way to consume ripe persimmons, which may have soft texture, is to remove the top leaf with a paring knife and scoop out the flesh with a spoon. Riper persimmons can also be eaten by removing the top leaf, breaking the fruit in half, and eating from the inside out. The flesh ranges from firm to mushy, and, when firm owing to being unripe, has an apple-like crunch. Some varieties are completely inedible until they are fully ripe, such as American persimmons (Diospyros virginiana) and Diospyros nigra. The leaves can be used to make a tisane and the seeds can be roasted.

In Korea, both firm and mushy persimmons are eaten fresh. Dried persimmon fruits are known as gotgam and are used to make the traditional Korean spicy punch sujeonggwa, while the matured, fermented fruit is used to make a persimmon vinegar called gamsikcho.

In Taiwan, fruits of astringent varieties are sealed in jars filled with limewater to get rid of bitterness. Slightly hardened in the process, they are sold under the name "crisp persimmon" (cuishi) or "water persimmon" (shuishizi). Preparation time is dependent upon temperature (5 to 7 days at 25–28 °C or 77–82 °F).

For centuries, Japanese have consumed persimmon leaf tea (Kaki-No-Ha Cha) made from the dried leaves of "kaki" persimmons (Diospyros kaki). In some areas of Manchuria and Korea, the dried leaves of the fruit are used for making tea. The Korean name for this tea is gamnip cha.

In the US from Ohio southward, persimmons are harvested and used in a variety of dessert dishes, most notably pies. They can be used in cookies, cakes, puddings, salads, curries and as a topping for breakfast cereal. Persimmon pudding is a baked dessert made with fresh persimmons that has the consistency of pumpkin pie but resembles a brownie and is almost always topped with whipped cream. An annual persimmon festival, featuring a persimmon pudding contest, is held every September in Mitchell, Indiana.

Persimmons may be stored at room temperature (20 °C or 68 °F), where they will continue to ripen. In northern China, unripe persimmons are frozen outdoors during winter to speed up the ripening process.

Ripe persimmons can be refrigerated for as long as a couple of weeks, though extreme temperature changes may contribute to a mushy texture. It is recommended to store persimmons stem end down.

Persimmons can also be fermented in the manner of black garlic.

=== Dried ===
In China, Korea, Japan and Vietnam, persimmons after harvesting are prepared using traditional hand-drying techniques outdoors for two to three weeks. The fruit is then further dried by exposure to heat over several days before being shipped to market, to be sold as dried fruit. In Japan, the dried persimmon fruit is called hoshigaki, in China shìbǐng (柿餠), in Korea gotgam or Geonsi (乾枾), and in Vietnam hồng khô (紅枯). It is eaten as a snack or dessert and used for other culinary purposes.

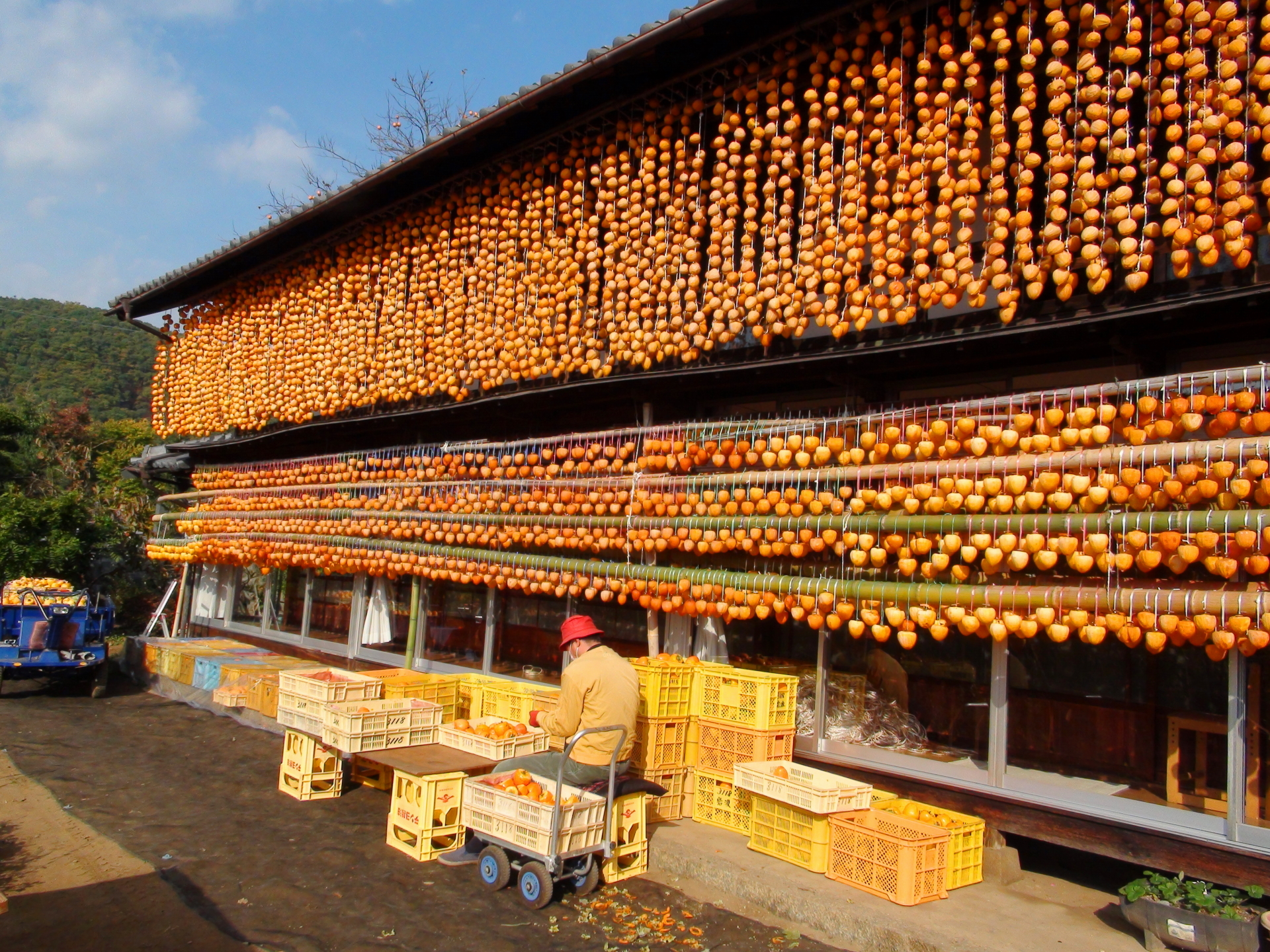
Persimmons drying in Kōshū city, Japan

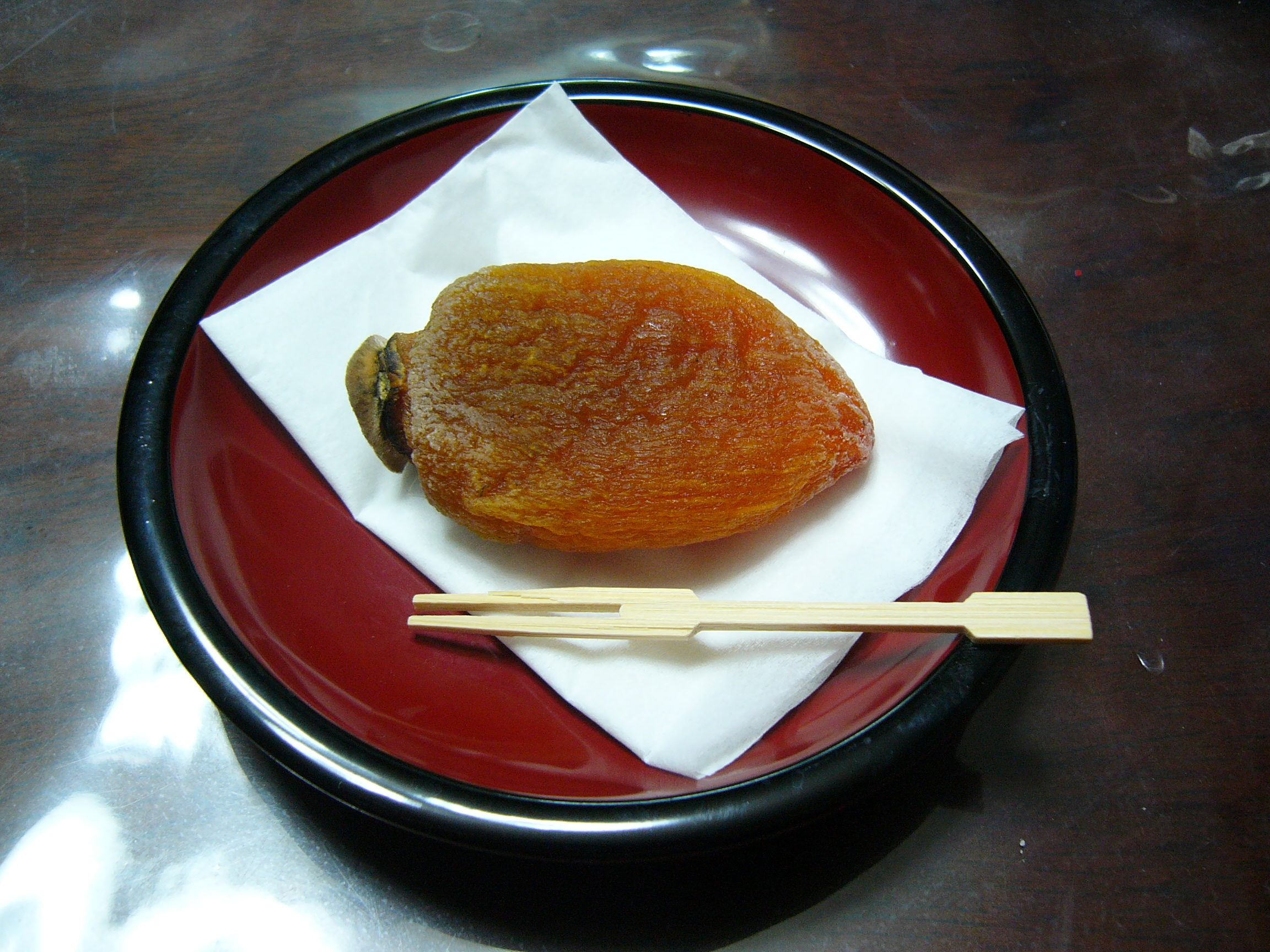
Hoshigaki, Japanese dried oriental persimmon

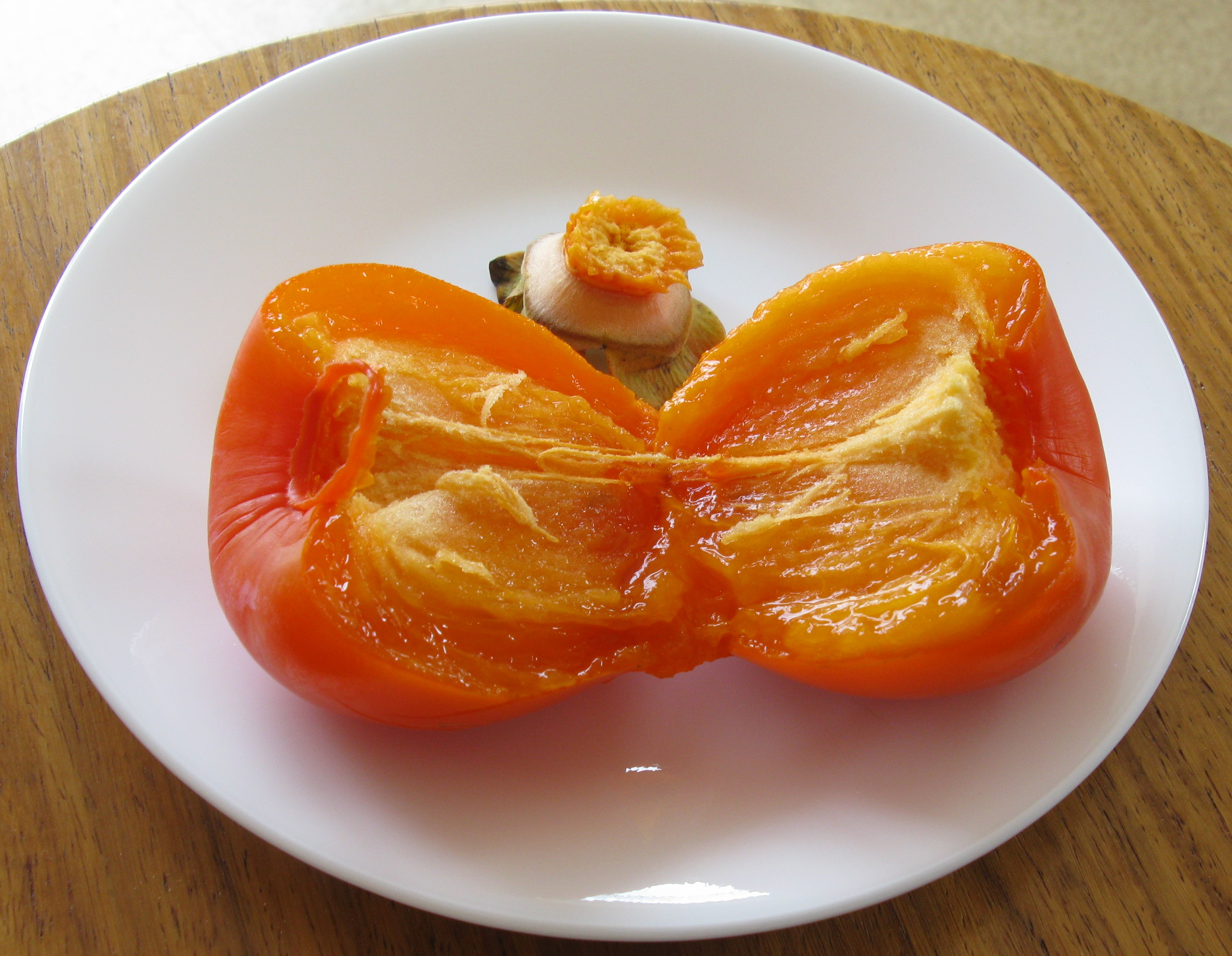
Ripe kaki, soft enough to remove the calyx and split the fruit for eating

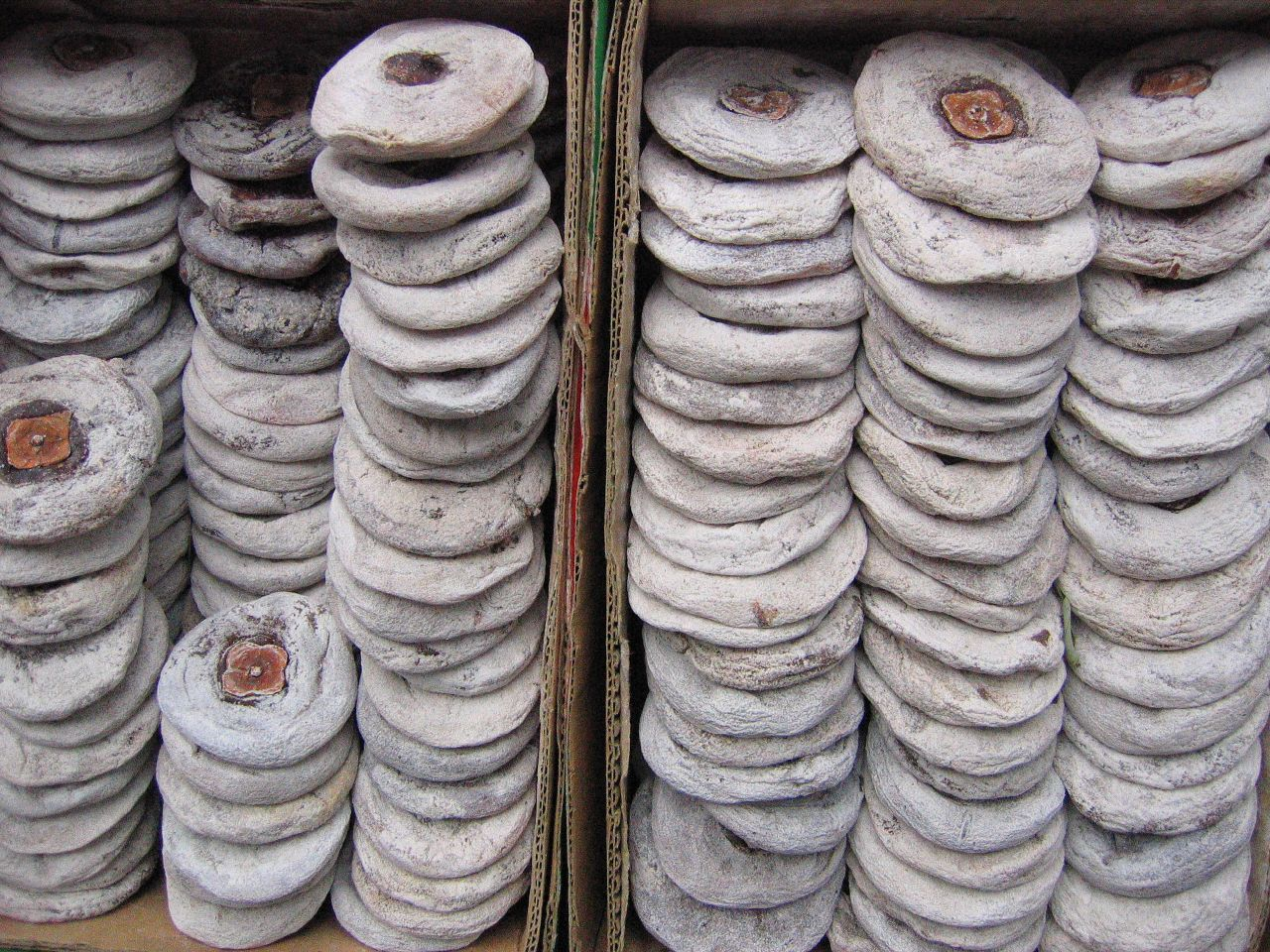
Peeled, flattened, and dried oriental persimmons (shìbǐng) in a Xi'an market

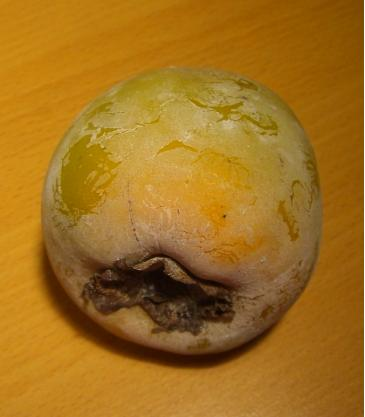
Kaki preserved in limewater

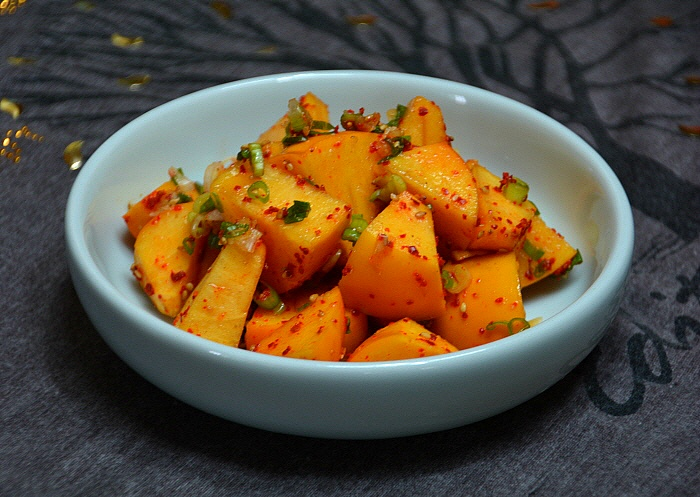
Dangam kkakdugi

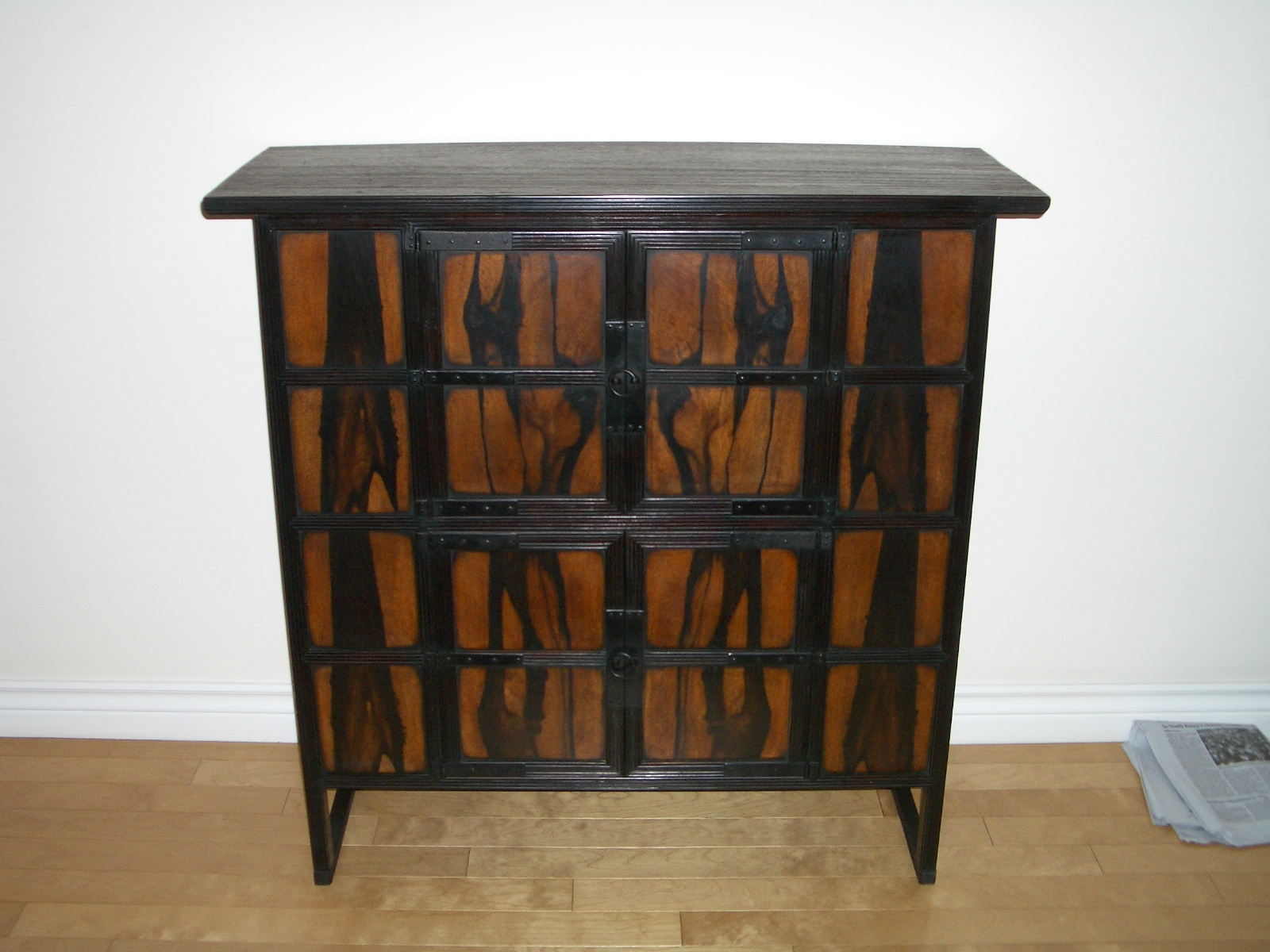
An example of persimmon wood furniture

== Culture ==
In Ozark folklore, the severity of the upcoming winter is said to be predictable by slicing a persimmon seed and seeing whether it is shaped like a knife, fork, or spoon within. According to the Missouri Department of Conservation, this is not a reliable method.

In Korean folklore the dried persimmon (gotgam, Korean: 곶감) has a reputation for scaring away tigers.

In Malaysia and Singapore, large persimmons are viewed as a status symbol.

== Diseases ==
In 1999, the first report of leaf blight on sweet persimmon tree by fungal pathogen Pestalotiopsis theae in Spain was documented.
