= Almanac (Canadian TV series) =

- Genre: Documentary
- Country of origin: Canada
- Original language: English
- No. of seasons: 1

Production
- Running time: 30 minutes

Original release
- Network: CBC Television
- Release: 2 October – 18 December 1961

Almanac is a Canadian documentary television series that aired on CBC Television in 1961.

== Premise ==
The series was a successor to Junior Roundup. It consisted of documentary segments geared towards secondary school audiences. The diverse range of topics included northern Canadian freight trains, the Alaska Highway, NORAD's operations, and HMS Bounty in Tahiti.

Almanac was broadcast Mondays at 4:30 p.m.
