= CA =

CA or ca may refer to:

== Places ==
=== Americas ===
- Canada, a country, by ISO 3166-1 alpha-2 code
- California, a U.S. state, by postal abbreviation
- Central America
- Catamarca Province, Argentina

=== Europe ===
- Province of Cádiz, Spain
- CA postcode area, United Kingdom
- Čadca District, Slovakia, former vehicle registration plate code

=== Asia ===
- Cả River, in Laos and Vietnam

== Transportation ==
=== Airlines ===
- Air China (IATA airline code CA)
- Cayman Airways, a Cayman Islands airline
- Continental Airlines, a U.S. airline

=== Driving ===
- Tokyo Bay Aqua-Line, a bridge-tunnel across Tokyo Bay area in Japan, numbered as CA
- CA-, the Central American highway network's route number prefix
- Nissan CA engine (Clean Air)

=== Maritime ===
- CA, a US Navy hull classification symbol: Heavy cruiser (CA)
- CA-class submarine, a group of midget submarines built for the Italian Navy during World War II

=== Train ===
- , the route code for Tōkaidō Line (Shizuoka area), operated by Central Japan Railway Company (JR Central)

== Mathematics, science, and technology ==
=== Life sciences ===
- Conservation agriculture, a food system
- Ca Mè Mallorquí, a dog breed native to Spain
- Ca (moth), a genus in the family Dalceridae
- Ca., abbreviation for Candidatus, for taxonomical names of prokaryotes (such as bacteria) that have not been completely described
- CA (journal), subtitled A Cancer Journal for Clinicians
- Cancer
- Carcinoma, a type of cancer
- Cardiac arrest
- Carbonic anhydrase, a family of enzymes

=== Chemistry ===
- Catecholamine, an organic compound
- Calcium, symbol Ca, a chemical element
- Cellulose acetate, a type of plastic
- Chemical Abstracts, a publication of Chemical Abstracts Service
- Cyanoacrylate, a family of adhesives

=== Mathematics, computing, and telecommunications ===
- Correspondence analysis, a multivariate statistical technique
- Cellular automaton, a discrete mathematical model
- Cultural algorithm, a type of evolutionary computation in computer science
- Certificate authority, an entity issuing digital certificates for secure communications
- Creative Assembly, a PC game developer
- Computer Associates International, Inc., later known as CA Technologies, Inc., a U.S. software company
- .ca, Internet country code for Canada
- ca.wikipedia.org, Catalan Wikipedia (Viquipèdia en català)
- Channel America, a defunct U.S. television network
- Conditional access, in broadcast engineering

=== Other uses in science and technology ===
- Centiampere (cA), an SI unit of electric current
- Chromatic aberration, a distortion in optical lenses

== Language and linguistics ==
- Ca., an abbreviation for circa, meaning "approximately" in Latin
- Ça, French demonstrative pronoun
- Ca (Indic), a glyph in the Brahmic family of scripts
- Ca (Javanese), a letter in the Javanese script
- Catalan language (ISO 639 alpha-2 language code)
- Contrastive analysis, the systematic study of a pair of languages
- Conversation analysis, the study of talk in interaction

== Schools ==
- Canadian Academy, an international school in Kobe, Japan
- Cary Academy, a private college-preparatory school in Cary, North Carolina, United States
- Claiborne Academy, a private school in Claiborne Parish, Louisiana, United States
- Clarksville Academy, a private college-preparatory school in Clarksville, Tennessee, United States
- Colorado Academy, a private college-preparatory school in Lakewood, Colorado, United States
- Concord Academy, a private college-preparatory school in Concord, Massachusetts, United States
- Connections Academy, an online school based in Baltimore, Maryland, United States
- Culver Academies, a boarding school and summer camp program in Culver, Indiana, United States

== In sport ==
- California Angels, former name of a professional baseball team currently known as Los Angeles Angels
- Club Africain, a multi-sport club from Tunis, Tunisia
- Cricket Australia, the governing body for professional and amateur cricket in Australia
- Cruising Association, a UK membership organization for sailors
- Cycling Australia, the national governing body for bicycle racing in Australia

== Government entities ==
- Bureau of Consular Affairs, a division of the U.S. Department of State
- Combined authority, a local government entity in the United Kingdom
- Commission on Appointments, a body of the Congress of the Philippines
- Court of Appeals
- Customs Administration, an agency of Taiwan

== Political parties and interest groups ==
- Canadian Alliance, a former Canadian political party
- Centre Alliance, Australian political party formerly known as Nick Xenophon Team
- Citizens' Alliance, a political party in Trinidad and Tobago
- Conservatives Abroad, overseas wing of the British Conservative Party
- Countryside Alliance, a British political organization
- Caterers' Association, former UK trade association

== Business ==
- Crédit Agricole, a major French bank
- Chartered accountant
- Confidentiality agreement or non-disclosure agreement, a contractual promise to restrict access to shared information
- Compañía Anónima, in Venezuela and Andorra, the equivalent of S.A. (corporation)
- Current account (disambiguation), a term with multiple meanings in macroeconomics and microeconomics / finance
- When appended to a stock-market ticker symbol (e.g. AAPL:CA): traded on Toronto Stock Exchange

== Other uses ==
- 'CA': Tactical Naval Warfare in the Pacific 1941-43, a 1973 board wargame that simulates World War II naval combat
- centiare = 1 square metre
- Character assassination, a deliberate and sustained effort to damage the reputation or credibility of an individual
- Civil affairs, a term used by both the United Nations and by military institutions
- Coal & Allied, Australian mining company
- Cocaine Anonymous, a twelve-step program
- Creativity Alliance, an arm of Creativity (religion), a white supremacist organization

== See also ==
- Communication arts (disambiguation)
- Circa (disambiguation)
- Class A (disambiguation)
- Ka (disambiguation)
- SA (disambiguation)
- Caca (disambiguation)
- ru:СА
- chr:ᏣᏱ
- ko:ꥢ
