= Calcium (disambiguation) =

Calcium is a chemical element with symbol Ca and atomic number 20.

Calcium may also refer to:

- Calcium, New York, a census-designated place in Jefferson County, New York
- Calcium, Queensland, a locality in the City of Townsville, Australia
- "Calcium", a song on the album Accelerator by The Future Sound of London
- "Calcium", a song on the album DeadBoy by Bones
- "Calcium", a song on the album E by Ecco2k

== See also ==
- Calcium in biology, for the role of calcium in biology and nutrition
- Calcium supplement, for the medical uses of calcium
- Isotopes of calcium
- Ca (disambiguation)
