= The Brusilov Offensive: Imperial Russia's Last Campaign =

1978 WWI board wargame

The Brusilov Offensive
- Designers: Jim Dunnigan
- Illustrators: Redmond A. Simonsen
- Publishers: SPI
- Publication: 1978
- Genres: World War I

The Brusilov Offensive: Imperial Russia's Last Campaign, 1916 is a board wargame published by Simulations Publications Inc. (SPI) in 1978 that simulates Imperial Russia's large offensive in 1916 during World War I. The game was one of four included in SPI's The Great War in the East "quadrigame" (four thematically-connected games in the same box that use the same set of rules).

== Background ==
In the spring of 1916, Italy was being hard-pressed by the Austro-Hungarians along the Isonzo Front, and France was locked in battle with Germany at Verdun. Both asked their ally, Imperial Russia, to attack on the Eastern Front in order to draw enemy forces out of Italy and France. Russia responded with the Brusilov Offensive, an attack through Galicia devised by Russian general Aleksei Brusilov. The Austro-Hungarian troops were unprepared for a Russian attack, and they quickly abandoned large sections of their trenches and fled. Although the Russian offensive through the summer of 1916 was a great success, and Germany and Austro-Hungary did transfer a large number of troops to the Eastern Front to prevent a complete collapse, success came at a high cost in human lives, and led to social unrest back in Russia that would eventually result in the collapse of the Russian government and monarchy in 1917.

== Description ==
The Brusilov Offensive is a wargame for two players in which one controls forces of the Central Powers, and the other controls Russian forces.

=== Gameplay ===
The 17" x 22" hex grid map, scaled at 8 miles (13 km) per hex, shows the starting positions of the Russian and Austro-Hungarian trenches along the border of Galicia in June 1916. Two hundred die-cut counters represent the various military units in the battle.

The game, which lasts 13 turns, uses the same alternating "I Go, You Go" system that SPI developed for the wargame Tannenberg where one player moves and then fires, followed by the other player. In addition, all units must be supplied and under command in order to move and attack. The game also puts emphasis on tactical capabilities — every unit has a rating that affects all of their actions. One turn represents 72 hours of the battle.

=== Supply ===
There are three sources of supply: a friendly map corner, a section of friendly railway connected to the rest of the network, or a depot that itself lays out a line that ensures adequate supplies. In addition, to be supplied a unit must also be within a certain number of hexes to the supply source. Units that are not supplied have their movement and strength halved and risk losing half of their soldiers.

=== Command ===
Each headquarters (HQ) has a command radius and a command capacity. Any units outside of this radius cannot move; of the units within the radius, the HQ can only move a number of units equal to its command capacity.

=== Austro-Hungarian panic ===
To simulate the Austro-Hungarian panic during the first days of the Brusilov offensive, Austro-Hungarian forces are subject to several special rules on the first turn:

1. All units defend with a minimum strength of only 1
2. If a unit receives an adverse combat result, it must retreat and lose a Strength point.
3. The panic is contagious, and if a unit is forced to retreat, any adjacent units must also retreat.

=== Victory conditions ===
Only the Russian player receives Victory Points for occupying key geographical points and eliminating enemy units. At the end of the game, if the Russian player earns more than 30 Victory Points, the Russian player wins. Thirty or fewer Victory Points results in a Central Powers victory.

== Publication history ==
In 1975, SPI published its first quadrigame, Blue & Gray. This proved to be popular, and SPI immediately produced further quadrigames. In 1978, SPI released The Great War in the East, and it proved popular, immediately rising to #8 on SPI's Top Ten Bestseller List, and remaining on the list for the next eight months. Each of the four games, including The Brusilov Offensive, designed by Jim Dunnigan and featuring graphic design by Redmond A. Simonsen, was also released as an individual "folio" game, packaged in an LP-style cardstock folder.

== Reception ==
In Issue 23 of the British wargaming magazine Phoenix, Andrew McGee commented "One of the major criticism I would direct at this game [is] the Victory Conditions are purely tactical; the game is about destroying enemy units and taking terrain, but this goes on, if at all, in a complete vacuum ... for the player the problem is that there is no apparent reason to conduct this offensive — except of course it gives Victory Points." On a more positive note, McGee noted that "the game plays well. To people accustomed to thinking of the Russian army here as woefully incompetent, it is a pleasure to watch them throwing the sales Boches ["dirty Krauts"] out of the trenches." McGee concluded "This is an enjoyable game if you like killing units."

Rick Mataka, writing in Craft, Model, and Hobby Industry Magazine, commented, "This is not the standard trench warfare battle that is often thought of [in World War I wargames]. Movement and envelopment are key factors to the victor of these historical battles." Mataka warned that the game was "Of intermediate complexity" and was not suitable for "those with limited boardgaming experience."

In Issue 3 of the French games magazine Casus Belli, Frédéric Armand noted "Those who are convinced that the Russian army (that of 1914-1918) was completely incompetent will witness with surprise the complete collapse of the Austro-German army, which, despite powerful reinforcements, has a hard time recovering. Nevertheless, the Russian army risks getting bogged down quite quickly, once the surprise of the first round has passed."

In a retrospective review in Issue 6 of Simulacrum, Brandon Einhorn called The Brusilov Offensive "good", giving it a grade of "B" and saying, "While the package is good, it's not great. The game can have a static and bloody feel to it, which may be realistic, but not as much fun as a game of maneuver."
