= Caporetto, 1917 =

1978 WWI board wargame

- Designers: Albert Nofi
- Illustrators: Redmond A. Simonsen
- Publishers: SPI
- Publication: 1978
- Genres: World War I

Caporetto, 1917, subtitled "Catastrophe for Italy", is a board wargame published by Simulations Publications Inc. (SPI) in 1978 that simulates the Battle of Caporetto. The game was part of SPI's "quadrigame" (four small games using the same set of rules) The Great War in the East.

== Background ==
During the spring and summer of 1917, Italian troops on the Austrian front had been part of eleven offensives in the Isonzo River area. Although the eleventh offensive had been moderately successful, it had brought both sides to the breaking point. Charles I of Austria asked Kaiser Wilhem II of Germany for aid, and the Germans moved nine divisions to the Isonzo area, including the stosstruppen (stormtroopers) that the Germans would soon use with devastating effect on the Western Front during Operation Michael. The Germans also provided expertise about where and when to use poison gas. On 24 October 1917, behind large clouds of poison gas, the combined Austrian and German forces smashed through the Italian lines, sending survivors stumbling back towards the safety of the Piave River.

== Description ==
Caporetto, 1917 is a wargame for two players in which one controls the Italians, and the other controls the Central Powers forces.

=== Gameplay ===
The 17" x 22" hex grid map, which shows the Italian/Austrian front in north-eastern Italy, is scaled at 5.5 kilometres (3.4 mi) per hex. Two hundred die-cut counters represent the various military units in the battle.

The game uses the same alternating "I Go, You Go" system that SPI developed for the wargame Tannenberg where one player moves and then fires, followed by the other player. In addition, all units must be supplied and under command in order to move and attack. The game also puts emphasis on tactical capabilities — every unit has a rating that affects all of their actions. One turn represents 48 hours of the battle.

=== Supply ===
There are three sources of supply: a friendly map corner, a section of friendly railway connected to the rest of the network, or a depot that itself lays out a line that ensures adequate supplies. In addition, to be supplied a unit must also be within a certain number of hexes to the supply source. Units that are not supplied have their movement and strength halved and risk losing half of their soldiers.

=== Command ===
Each headquarters (HQ) has a command radius and a command capacity. Any units outside of this radius cannot move; of the units within the radius, the HQ can only move a number of units equal to its command capacity.

=== Victory conditions ===
The Central Powers player gets Victory Points for crossing the Piave River, capturing fortresses, and destroying Italian corps or divisions. The Italian player earns points for being across the Piave River, for eliminating stosstruppe units and taking Triest or Trent. The player with the most points at the end of the game is the winner.

== Publication history ==
Caporetto, 1917 was designed by Albert Nofi, and initially appeared as one of four games in the box titled The Great War in the East, published by SPI in 1975. The game was also released as an individual "folio" game, packaged in an LP-style cardstock folder with graphic design by Redmond A. Simonsen.

In 1988, a Japanese-language translation of the game was published in Issue 8 (August 1988) of the Japanese wargaming magazine Tactics.

== Reception ==
In Issue 37 of the British wargaming magazine Perfidious Albion, Charles Vasey and Geoffrey Barnard discussed the game. Vasey compared this game to its predecessor Tannenberg and commented, "This game is rather more open." However Vasey was disappointed in the Victory Point rules, saying, "They are so silly they ruin the game." Barnard replied, "The design seems to follow the school of game design that says the player has to do better than the historical outcome in order to win, hence the onus on the Austrians to cross the Piave."

In Issue 23 of the British wargaming magazine Phoenix, Andrew McGee felt that SPI had missed some opportunities, wishing that there had been some non-historical "what if?" scenarios included. McGee also felt that the game failed to adequately demonstrate how the historical result was achieved, saying, "the game gives no understanding of why things happened as they did." Despite this, McGee admitted, "This is the cleanest of the games [in the quadrigame] from the rules point of view, but does little to explain why Caporetto happened as it did." McGee concluded, "The system is a sound vessel, but the designers seem to have forgotten to fill it."

Rick Mataka, writing in Craft, Model, and Hobby Industry Magazine, commented, "This is not the standard trench warfare battle that is often thought of [in World War I wargames]. Movement and envelopment are key factors to the victor of this historical battle." Mataka warned that the game was "Of intermediate complexity" and was not suitable for "those with limited boardgaming experience."

In Issue 3 of the French games magazine Casus Belli, Frédéric Armand noted the lack of historical imperative, saying, "Caporetto is the clearest of the four games [included in the quadrigame] from a rules perspective, but hardly explains why [the Battle of] Caporetto was such a disaster for Italy." Armand concluded, "There's no doubt that this game fills a void. The game system is quite simple; the timescale, 2 days per turn, allows for the coverage of entire campaigns without sacrificing playability. But there are two criticisms: it's possible to win using a non-historical strategy; and, it does not explain at any point why or how these historical events unfolded as they did. Clarifications on certain phases, on the reasons for certain decisions, would have been highly appreciated."

In Issue 16 of Paper Wars, Robert Lindsay commented, "The tactical competence rating runs through all the rules and show the strengths of each army in general and the superior features of the German army in particular."

In a retrospective review in Issue 6 of Simulacrum, Brandon Einhorn gave this game a grade of "B", saying, "While the package is good, it's not great. The game can have a static and bloody feel to it, which may be realistic, but not as much fun as a game of maneuver."
