= In Struggle =

Spanish anticapitalist organisation (1994–2016)

In Struggle En Lucha En Lluita
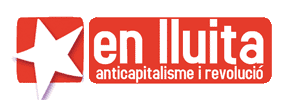
- Founded: 30 October 1994
- Dissolved: 3 November 2016
- Headquarters: Barcelona
- Newspaper: En Lluita; L'Heura
- Youth wing: Estudiants en lluita
- Ideology: Trotskyism
- National affiliation: CUP–CC
- European affiliation: European Anti-Capitalist Left
- International affiliation: International Socialist Tendency
- Slogan: Anticapitalism and Revolution

En lucha was also a Maoist publication by the Workers' Revolutionary Organisation.

In Struggle (Castilian: En lucha, Catalan: En Lluita) was a Spanish revolutionary socialist organisation within Trotskyist tradition. It was part of the International Socialist Tendency led by the British Socialist Workers Party It was founded in 1994 with the name Socialismo Internacional, which was changed in 1998 to Izquierda Revolucionaria and finally to En Lucha/En Lluita in 2001. For a number of years, it produced a newspaper under those names. The group was mainly based in Catalonia, especially in the city of Barcelona, but also had branches in other parts of the Spanish state, notably in Madrid and Andalusia. In 2016, In Struggle voted to dissolve.

== History ==
Towards the end of the 1990s the group was heavily involved in the campaign to close ca, a Nazi bookshop in Barcelona. Soon after it became one of the first organisations in the Spanish state to become active in the anti-globalisation movement. It was very much involved in the European Social Forum mobilisations: Florence (2002), Paris (2003) and London (2004). It was also one of the initiators of Aturem la Guerra (Stop the War) platform, which called the huge demonstration in Barcelona on 15 February 2003.

It also participated in the movement for decent housing (2006), the mobilisation for the right of self-determination for Catalonia (2006 onwards), the student movement against the Bologna higher education reforms (2007-2010) and was involved in setting up Unitat Contra el Feixisme i el Racisme (Unity against Racism and Fascism).

En Lluita/En Lucha was very active in the anti-austerity 15-M movement (2011–15) and participated in the Anticapitalistas’ candidature in the Spanish state-wide elections in 2011 as part of the Des de baix (From below) coalition. In the elections to the Generalitat of Catalonia in 2012 it was a component of the Popular Unity Candidacy (CUP).

In 2013, a major internal crisis erupted in the British SWP as a result of accusations of rape against a leading member of the party. The party’s leadership was also accused of covering up these and subsequent accusations of sexual assault and harassment. This scandal led to a third of the party’s membership leaving the organisation and it also had repercussions in the IST. The Serbian group left and the Irish SWP and In Struggle passed motions which were very critical of the way the SWP leadership had handled the crisis.

At the end of October 2016, the In Struggle group voted overwhelmingly to dissolve. In a statement entitled “One step forward, two backwards” the group stated “in the definitive moments of the Catalan independence process, it’s necessary to strengthen the Popular Unity Candidacy (CUP)”.

== Today ==
Some Catalan ex-members of In Struggle are active within the CUP while others have joined Anticapitalistes/Anticapitalistas, as have others in the rest of the Spanish state. A handful of ex-members in Barcelona and Andalusia have formed a Marx21 group, which is part of the International Socialist Tendency.
