= Angelo Parra =

American playwright (born 20th centur)

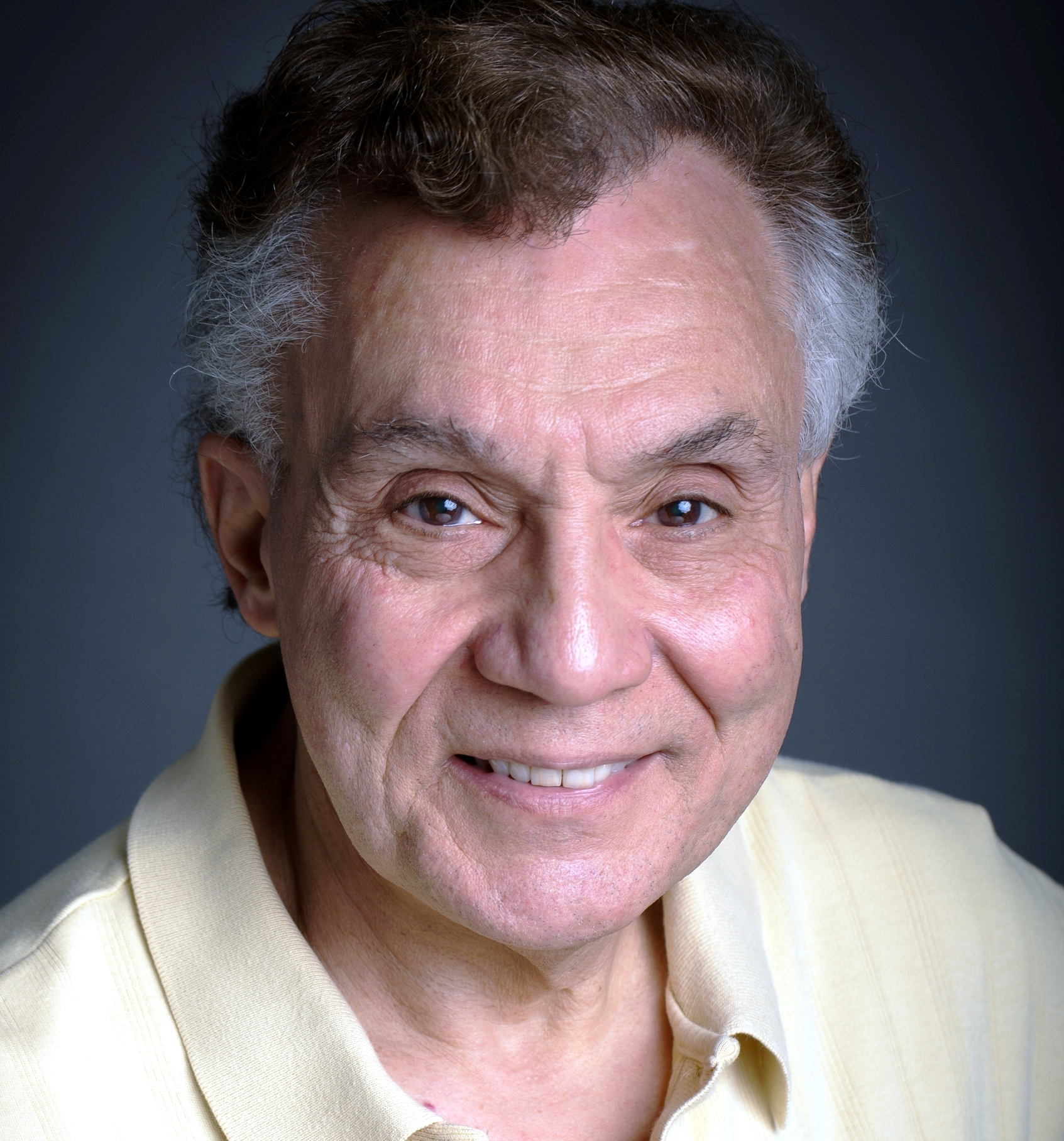
Angelo Parra (George Pejoves Photography) (circa 2021)

Angelo Parra (born 20th century) is an American playwright and educator. He teaches playwriting, performing arts, and English at SUNY's Rockland Community College.

== Early life, education and early career ==
Parra was born in Manhattan and grew up in the Bronx, New York, New York, United States.

After graduating from Fordham University in New York City with a Bachelor of Arts degree in communication arts, his career included work as a reporter/photographer, public-relations professional, politician, free-lance writer, and public-relations and journalism teacher at New York University before turning to theatre in 1986.

Parra studied his craft at:

- Roundabout Theatre Conservatory's Professional Playwright's Unit
- New Dramatists Playwrights' Forum
- a playwright’s workshop at Playwrights Horizons (with Albert Innaurato)
- the Playwrights Lab at T. Schreiber Studio

He earned a Master of Fine Arts degree in playwriting under Jack Gelber at Brooklyn College. Parra earned a Master of Arts degree in political science at The New School in New York City. He also is a graduate of the Hollywood Film Institute Independent Filmmaker Course.

== Playwright ==
His first produced play, Casino, was presented at T. Schreiber Studio, and won a 1989 New York Foundation for the Arts (NYFA) Fellowship in Playwriting and an Arts International grant (sponsored by the National Endowment for the Arts, the U.S. Information Agency, the Rockefeller Foundation, and The Pew Charitable Trusts).

His work The Devil's Music: The Life and Blues of Bessie Smith, with music on the life of Bessie Smith, was named "one of the top-10 Off-Broadway experiences of 2001" by the New York Daily News, "Best Solo Show" by Florida's New Times Broward-Palm Beach, won a second NYFA Playwriting Fellowship (2000), and was nominated for a Helen Hayes Award, Best Visiting Production (2018), and by the Lucille Lortel Awards for Best Solo Show in 2012. The show, conceived by and originally directed by Joe Brancato and originally staged by Penguin Rep theatre company in Stony Point, New York, was invited to give six performances during the 2012 Montreal International Jazz Festival, making The Devil's Music the first play ever presented in the music festival's thirty-year history.

Parra has production credits in New York City, Los Angeles, Chicago, Washington, D.C., as well as at:

- Florida Stage (Palm Beach, Florida)
- Hartford Stage (Hartford, Connecticut
- Theatre Memphis (Memphis, Tennessee)
- The Cape Playhouse (Dennis, Massachusetts)
- George Street Playhouse (New Brunswick, New Jersey)
- Florida Rep
- Royal Manitoba Theatre Center
- Milwaukee Repertory Theater (Milwaukee, Wisconsin)
- Cleveland Play House (Cleveland, Ohio)
- Edinburgh International Festival (Edinburgh, Scotland)

Among Parra's other plays is the hospital drama Journey of the Heart, winner of the Jewel Box Theatre, Mixed Blood Theatre, and David James Ellis national play awards in 1998–99. Also in 1998, Song of the Coquí, his Hispanic family drama with humor and dance, won the Chicano/Latino Literary Award (University of California, Irvine) and an "American Dream" prize by the Repertorio Español theatre company in New York City. His screenplay adaptation of Journey of the Heart was a Sundance Institute Feature Film Program Finalist (2002).

Along with the children's musical Percy T. Penguin Comes to America, Parra's other plays include:

- The Mnemonist
- Canvases
- The Price of Honor
- Brooklyn Brownstone
- Beau Geste – adaptation
- Of Human Bondage – adaptation
- Borinquen
- Newley Discovered
- Eva's Song – musical

== Other ==
Parra also is the author of Playwriting for Dummies, part of the popular international series of how-to books. Working with editor Jeffrey B. Fuerst at Benchmark Education publishing, Parra has written a dozen plays, essays, and historical books for grades K–12. Parra also provides playscript consultation at playscriptcoach.

Parra is a Penguin Rep theatre-company board trustee and founder and moderator of the Main Street Playwright's Lab in Tarrytown, New York.

== Accolades ==
Parra is the winner of a National Endowment for the Humanities Landmarks of American History and Culture Grant (2008), is a member of the Dramatists Guild and member emeritus of the BMI Lehman Engel Musical Theater Workshop. He was a Tennessee Williams Scholar at the 2000 Sewanee Writers Conference.
