= Joey Albert =

Filipina singer (born 1960)

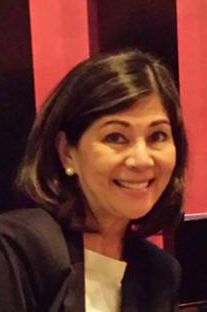
- Albert in 2017
- Born: Maria Josefina Albert; March 19, 1960 (age 66); Philippines
- Education: Assumption College (Philippines) (CA)
- Occupations: Singer, songwriter
- Years active: 1982–present
- Spouse: Vicente Pacis III (m. 1988)
- Children: 2
- Website: joeyalbert.com

Maria Josefina Albert (born March 19, 1960) is a Filipino singer, songwriter, and lyricist. An alumna of St. Theresa's College Manila and Assumption College San Lorenzo, she began her professional singing career in 1981. In 1982, she was proclaimed winner of the Dream Girl Filipina contest on The Party, a television program hosted by Ariel Ureta over the now-defunct Banahaw Broadcasting Corporation (now known today as A2Z 11 & formerly known as ABS-CBN 2). Albert became a member of The New Minstrels (3rd Generation), a popular Philippine show band during the 1970s and the 1980s. Apart from Albert, The New Minstrels also produced many other outstanding Filipino musical artists.

Albert has also collaborated with other well-known artists such as the Apo Hiking Society, Jose Mari Chan, The Company, El DeBarge, Mike Francis, Fritz Infante, Julio Iglesias, Dennis Lambert, Raymond Lauchengco, Babsie Molina, Douglas Nierras, Basil Valdez, Eugene Villaluz and Nonoy Zuñiga. She has performed in Canada, Indonesia, Malaysia, the Philippines, Singapore, the United States, and in various cities across Europe and the Middle East. As a multi-awarded singer, her discography boasts more than 20 studio albums.

== Career ==
As a solo performer, Albert signed up initially with OctoArts International (now PolyEast Records) in 1984. Her first single, Gerry Paraiso's "Over and Over" (recorded January 1984), enjoyed tremendous airplay in local and national radio stations. OctoArts International released Louie Ocampo and Allan Ayque's "Tell Me", for which she received a Gold Record Award from the Philippine Association of the Record Industry (PARI). Albert is also the first Filipino artist to record on CD. Subsequently, Albert received the Best Female Vocalist trophy during the 1985 Cecil Awards, the Philippine music industry awards during the 1980s.

"Tell Me" established Albert as a major Filipino musical artist. Apart from "Over and Over" and "Tell Me", Albert's first album (Joey Albert) produced another hit, Robbie Moore's "A Million Miles Away". Cris Kuizon's "Say You're Mine", on the other hand, foreshadowed a resurgence of the acoustic in Philippine popular music. Albert completed five more albums for OctoArts International: Touch of Love (1984), Expressions (1985), Joey (1986), Maligayang Pasko (1987) and Mixed Emotions (1989). These albums produced many hits, including Louie Ocampo–Freddie Santos collaborations like "Memories" (recorded January 1984), "Points of View" (duet with Pops Fernandez, recorded January 1984) and "Yakapin Mo Ako" (recorded November 1985).

Other hits included Jose Mari Chan's "I Remember the Boy" (recorded November 1985), Louie Ocampo and Jim Millbower's "Without You" (recorded November 1986), Louie Ocampo and Joey Albert's "Ikaw Lang ang Mamahalin" (recorded November 1986), Ray-Ann Fuentes's "Porma ng Porma" (recorded September 1988), Tony Perez and Allan Ayque's "Back in My Arms" (recorded September 1988), Louie Ocampo, Joey Albert and Janice de Belen's "It's Over Now" (recorded November 1985), Louie Ocampo and Joey Albert's "You Threw It All Away" (recorded November 1986) and Sunny Ilacad and Joey Albert's "Na Sabihin Mo" (recorded November 1985). Albert moved to Dyna Records in 1990. Her first album for the company, entitled Joey Albert, included commercial and artistic hits "Only a Mem'ry" and "Roses in the Rain", "How Can I Make You See", "Paano Sasabihin", "Sa Aking Pagbabalik", and "Iisa Pa Lamang". At the 1990 Awit Awards telecast, she received twin nominations as Best Female Vocalist of the Year for "Only a Mem'ry" and "Iisa Pa Lamang". She won for "Only a Mem'ry".

From 1991 to 1994, Albert became the host and executive producer of Bahay Kalinga, an award-winning public service outreach program at ABS-CBN. After moving to Canada in 1994, Albert hosted The Joey Albert Show, a magazine talk show that featured stories and interviews with Filipinos in Canada, on the Shaw Multicultural Channel. Aside from singing and hosting, Albert raises funds for Gawad Kalinga, a Philippine-based group that builds homes for the poor. Albert also owns and operates "The Good Shepherd Daycare", a Catholic daycare and preschool in Coquitlam.

Albert's homecoming shows in the Philippines are eagerly awaited by her fans. Joey Albert... Once More, her sell-out concert at the Music Museum on August 10 and 11, 2001, featured singer-composer Jeffrey Hidalgo with Gerard Salonga as musical director. During a press conference preceding the concert, esteemed movie critic and Malaya Sunday Magazine editor Mario Hernando pointed out that Albert holds the distinction of having released the first CD, a compilation of her greatest hits, in the Philippines.

In 2007, Albert recorded a new version of "Tell Me" as theme song of Star Cinema's A Love Story, a romantic drama film about infidelity starring Filipino actors Aga Muhlach, Maricel Soriano and Angelica Panganiban. Albert's new version re-introduced her body of works to a new generation of Filipinos.

In 2009, Albert and Basil Valdez were headline performers in Incomparable, as part of a series of concerts organized by Viva Concerts & Events featuring iconic Original Pilipino Music (OPM) artists at the Skydome in SM City North EDSA (Quezon City). Viva scheduled several other shows, including Regine Velasquez’s "Most Requested", "Ladies of the '90s" (Rachel Alejandro, Jessa Zaragoza, Roselle Nava and Geneva Cruz), "Men of the ’80s" (Raymond Lauchengco, Randy Santiago, Louie Heredia and Gino Padilla) and one topbilling Rachelle Ann Go and Jed Madela.

In 2010, Albert released Songs of the Heart, made up of original Filipino compositions carefully chosen by producer Eugene Villaluz for Viva Records. The album contained some of Albert's personal favorites, as well as hits that came out after she left the Philippines. The songs in the album were originally popularized by Side A ("Forevermore"), South Border ("Kahit Kailan"), Christian Bautista ("The Way You Look at Me"), The Company ("Muntik Na Kitang Minahal"), Anna Fegi ("Saan Ka Na Kaya Ngayon"), and Bituin Escalante ("Kung Ako Na Lang Sana"), among others. Though she liked all of the songs included in the album, Albert picked "Forevermore" as her personal favorite largely because the material was originally done by Side A, the same band that re-introduced Albert's "Tell Me" to local charts back in 2001.

In 2012, Albert has performed in highly successful Philippine reunion concerts featuring all-star members of the defunct groups Circus Band and The New Minstrels. Albert spearheaded fundraising efforts for Typhoon Haiyan in the Vancouver metropolitan area. Tickets to her shows were by donation to the Canadian Red Cross. She also finished another reunion concert with the New Minstrels and the Circus Band at the Music Museum in February 2014.

In 2018, critic Ruel Mendoza cited Albert's rendition of "Kumukutikutitap" (1987) as one of ten most enduring Christmas songs in the Philippines. The song was composed by National Artist for Music Ryan Cayabyab and written by veteran film director and screenwriter Jose Javier Reyes.

During the 2019 Aliw Awards, Albert was declared Best foreign-based Filipino performer. The 32nd edition of the entertainment awards also saw popular singer-actress Regine Velasquez winning the Entertainer of the Year Award. Tony and Olivier award-winning musical artist Lea Salonga was elevated to the Hall of Fame.

Albert marked her 40th year as a musical artist with Life Begins @ 40: 40 years of Joey Albert's Music, a solo digital concert on KTX.ph on July 11 and 12, 2021.

== Political views ==
In 1986, Albert campaigned for the reelection of president Ferdinand Marcos in the 1986 snap election.

== Personal life ==
Albert married Vicente Pacis III on August 14, 1988. They have two daughters, Trixie and Marga. Her mother is the late Leticia Tordesillas Albert, the foundress of the Marian Missionaries of the Holy Cross.

=== Health concerns; relocation to Canada ===
Albert's career was interrupted by serious illnesses. After surviving cervical cancer in 1995, Albert was diagnosed with colon cancer in 2003. She underwent successful surgery in July 2003 and completed chemotherapy in March 2004.

Since 1994, Albert and her family has been living in Vancouver, British Columbia.

On January 28, 2015, medical tests confirmed that Albert's cancer had recurred. Despite being in pain, Albert struggled to put up a brave front during her Valentine concert with The CompanY last February 13 and 14, 2015 at the Music Museum in the Philippines, two weeks after her colon cancer was diagnosed to have recurred.

After Music Museum, Albert did five more shows for the Philippine Amusement and Gaming Corporation (PAGCOR) in major cities across the Philippines. However, she was forced to apologize for her inability to do another show in Cebu. The Philippine Star reported that, at the end of her third PAGCOR show, Albert suffered from dehydration and was informed that she might have enough strength for only one long trip. Soon after, she rushed back to Canada in time for her medical procedure. Albert had a successful surgery on March 27, 2015.

== Awards ==
- Dream Girl Filipina (1982)
- Tinig Award for Best Female Vocalist (1983)
- Guillermo Mendoza Awards for Best Female Vocalist (1984)
- Cecil Award for Best Female Vocalist for "Tell Me" (1985)
- Philippine Association of the Recording Industry (PARI) Gold Record Award for "Tell Me" (Octo Arts, 1986)
- Catholic Mass Media Award for "Ikaw Lang ang Mamahalin" (as songwriter, 1988)
- Awit Award for Best Female Vocalist for "Only a Mem’ry" (1991)
- Philippine Association of the Recording Industry (PARI) Platinum Record Award for the album Joey Albert (Dyna, 1992)
- Philippine Association of the Recording Industry (PARI) Gold and Platinum Record Awards for "Iisa Pa Lamang" (1991, 1994)
- Filipino Academy of Movie Arts and Sciences (FAMAS) Best Movie Theme Song Award for "Iisa Pa Lamang" (as vocalist, 1992)
- Awit Award for Best Christmas Recording for "Be Like the Children on Christmas" (1994)
- Manila Film Festival Best Movie Theme Song Award for "Sa 'Yo Lamang" (as vocalist, 1995)
- Awit Award for Best Ballad for "It's Over Now" (as songwriter, with Louie Ocampo and Janice de Belen, vocals by Kyla, 2008)
- Inducted to the Walk of Fame Philippines, Eastwood City (2011)
- Aliw Award for Best foreign-based Filipino Performer/ Best Filipino Artist Abroad (2019)

== Discography ==
=== Albums ===
==== Studio albums ====
- Joey Albert (1983)
- Touch of Love (1984)
- Expressions (1985)
- Joey (1986)
- Maligayang Pasko (1987)
- Back in My Arms (1988)
- Mixed Emotions (1989)
- Joey Albert (1990)
- Brief Encounters (1992)
- A Christmas with Joey Albert (1993)
- Sa'yo Lamang (1995)
- Inspirations (1998)
- Lookin' Back (2000)
- Songs of the Heart (2009)

==== Compilation albums ====
- Greatest Hits (1992)
- The Best of Joey Albert (1992)
- OPM Timeless Collection: Gold Series 2 (1997)
- Greatest Hits (1998)
- The Story Of Joey Albert (The Ultimate OPM Collection) (2001)

==== Collaboration albums ====
- Sandalwood (with Carmen Valdez) (2004)

==== Soundtrack albums ====
- Ikaw Lang Ang Mamahalin (1999)

==== Karaoke albums ====
- The Story of Joey Albert (The Ultimate OPM Videoke Collection) (2001)

=== Singles ===
- "Tell Me" (1983)
- "Ikaw Lang Ang Mamahalin" (1986)
- "Kumukutikutitap" (1987)
- "Porma ng Porma" (1989)
- "Iisa Pa Lamang" / "Roses in the Rain" (1991)

==== Remakes ====
- "Tell Me" (A Love Story theme song) (2007)

==== Covers ====
- "Forevermore" (originally by Side A)
- "Kung Ako Na Lang Sana" (originally by Bituin Escalante)
- "Sa'yo Lamang" (originally by Bukas Palad Choir)
- "The Way You Look at Me" (originally by Christian Bautista)

== Filmography ==
- Naku...Ha! (1984)
- Ready!.. Aim!.. Fire!.. (1987)
- Pulis... Pulis... sa Ilalim ng Tulay (1989)
