= Serbia/Galicia: Austria-Hungary at War, 1914 =

1978 WWI board wargame

Serbia/Galicia
- Designers: Jay Nelson
- Illustrators: Redmond A. Simonsen
- Publishers: SPI
- Publication: 1978
- Genres: World War I

Serbia/Galicia: Austria-Hungary at War, 1914 is a board wargame published by Simulations Publications Inc. (SPI) in 1978 that simulates the efforts of Austria-Hungary in the first year of World War I to fight a two-front war between Serbia to the west and Russia to the east. The game was one of four included in SPI's The Great War in the East "quadrigame" (four thematically connected games in the same box that use the same set of rules).

== Background ==
In the first weeks of World War I, the military objectives of each country involved were revealed. Austria's were two-fold: to quickly conquer the small country of Serbia and to invade the Russian province of Galicia. However, Serbian forces proved much more difficult to overcome than anticipated, unbalancing Austria's war plans.

== Description ==
Serbia/Galicia is a wargame for two players in which one controls forces of the Central Powers, and the other controls Allied forces.

=== Gameplay ===
The 17" x 22" hex grid map, scaled at 8 miles (13 km) per hex, is split into two sections: the Serbian border area, and the Russian/Galician frontier. Two hundred die-cut counters represent the various military units in the battle.

The game, which lasts 13 turns, uses the same alternating "I Go, You Go" system that SPI developed for the wargame Tannenberg where one player moves and then fires, followed by the other player. In addition, all units must be supplied and under command in order to move and attack. The game also puts emphasis on tactical capabilities — every unit has a rating that affects all of their actions. One turn represents 72 hours of the battle.

Optional rules include a non-historical Austrian plan of attack, and a cavalry forage rule that allows cavalry units to avoid supply issues if they can forage for food.

=== Supply ===
There are three sources of supply: a friendly map corner, a section of friendly railway connected to the rest of the network, or a depot that itself lays out a line that ensures adequate supplies. In addition, to be supplied a unit must also be within a certain number of hexes to the supply source. Units that are not supplied have their movement and strength halved and risk losing half of their soldiers.

=== Command ===
Each headquarters (HQ) has a command radius and a command capacity. Any units outside of this radius cannot move; of the units within the radius, the HQ can only move a number of units equal to its command capacity.

=== Tactics ===
Critic Andrew McGee warned the Allied player against attacking with the Serbian army, noting, "One lesson rapidly learned from the game is that the worst thing the Serbs can do is attack. Their army is efficient, but not sufficient, and they can ill afford the losses inevitable in an attack." On the other hand, McGee also pointed out, "At the same time, the last thing the Austrians want is to be facing both opponents at once; consequently the Serbian front tends to be rather quiet."

=== Victory conditions ===
Both players receive Victory Points for occupying key geographical points and eliminating enemy units. At the end of the game, the Austro-Hungarian points are subtracted from the Allied points. If the result is a positive number, the Allied player is the winner, and if it is a negative number, the Austro-Hungarian player wins.

== Publication history ==
In 1975, SPI published its first quadrigame, Blue & Gray. This proved to be popular, and SPI immediately produced further quadrigames. In 1978, SPI released The Great War in the East, and it proved popular, immediately rising to #8 on SPI's Top Ten Bestseller List, and remaining on the list for the next eight months. Each of the four games, including Serbia/Galicia, designed by Jay Nelson and featuring graphic design by Redmond A. Simonsen, was also released as an individual "folio" game, packaged in an LP-style cardstock folder.

== Reception ==
In Issue 23 of the British wargaming magazine Phoenix, Andrew McGee commented "This game is billed as Austria's two-front war, but only in the most nominal sense was it so; facing Russia and the Serbs at the same time can perhaps best be compared with the plight of a boxer taking on Muhammed Ali and two geriatric mice." McGee noted that "certainly this game seems to reflect that [in the early days of the war] no one had really sorted out what was going on; the objectives are limited, as are the capabilities of the army." McGee concluded, "This is a very frustrating game, for players will naturally want to be more ambitious — a futile wish as they will discover."

Rick Mataka, writing in Craft, Model, and Hobby Industry Magazine, commented, "This is not the standard trench warfare battle that is often thought of [in World War I wargames]. Movement and envelopment are key factors to the victor of these historical battles." Mataka warned that the game was "Of intermediate complexity" and was not suitable for "those with limited boardgaming experience."

In Issue 3 of the French games magazine Casus Belli, Frédéric Armand noted "The historic events of the early months of this theater — Austria's futile attempt to instantly conquer Serbia and their foray into Russian territory in Galicia — are reproduced very well." Armand pointed out the choices available to both players, as "the Allied player must seek to coordinate attacks from Galicia and Serbia, while the Austrians must choose to move in one direction or the other." Armand concluded, "There are a few criticisms to be made of this game, notably that it only provides limited objectives. Nevertheless, it is quite fun and full of twists and turns."

In a retrospective review in Issue 6 of Simulacrum, Brandon Einhorn called Serbia/Galicia the worst of the four games in the Great War in the East quadrigame, noting "It's not much fun launching frontal offensives against an enemy in trenches that can eventually withdraw." Einhorn concluded by giving a grade of "B", saying, "While the package is good, it's not great. The game can have a static and bloody feel to it, which may be realistic, but not as much fun as a game of maneuver."
