= Von Hindenburg in Poland =

1978 WWI board wargame

- Designers: Anthony Beavers
- Illustrators: Redmond A. Simonsen
- Publishers: SPI
- Publication: 1978
- Genres: World War I

Von Hindenburg in Poland, subtitled "The Warsaw-Lodz Campaign, 1914", is a board wargame published by Simulations Publications Inc. (SPI) in 1978 that simulates the back-and-forth struggle in late 1914 between Russia and the Central Powers in Poland and Silesia during World War I. The game was one of four games included in SPI's The Great War in the East "quadrigame" (four thematically-connected games packaged in one box that use the same set of rules).

== Background ==
In October 1914, Russia invaded the German province of Silesia. To counter this, German general Paul von Hindenburg launched an attack toward Warsaw (Poland was then part of the Russian Empire). The next six weeks saw the two sides surge and retreat, attempting to encircle each other.

== Description ==
Von Hindenburg in Poland is a wargame for two players in which one controls Russian forces, and the other controls the Central Powers forces.

=== Gameplay ===
The 17" x 22" hex grid map of eastern Poland is scaled at 8 miles (13 km) per hex. Two hundred die-cut counters represent the various military units in the battle.

The game, which lasts 15 turns, uses the same alternating "I Go, You Go" system that SPI developed for the wargame Tannenberg where one player moves and then fires, followed by the other player. In addition, all units must be supplied and under command in order to move and attack. The game also puts emphasis on tactical capabilities — every unit has a rating that affects all of their actions. One turn represents 48 hours of the battle.

An optional rule allows the Germans to use hidden movement (to simulate faulty Russian intelligence).

=== Supply ===
There are three sources of supply: a friendly map corner, a section of friendly railway connected to the rest of the network, or a depot that itself lays out a line that ensures adequate supplies. In addition, to be supplied a unit must also be within a certain number of hexes to the supply source. Units that are not supplied have their movement and strength halved and risk losing half of their soldiers.

=== Command ===
Each headquarters (HQ) has a command radius and a command capacity. Any units outside of this radius cannot move; of the units within the radius, the HQ can only move a number of units equal to its command capacity.

=== Victory conditions ===
Both players receive Victory Points for destroying enemy units, and for occupying various towns and cities. The player with the most Victory Points at the end of the game is the winner.

== Publication history ==
In 1975, SPI published its first quadrigame, Blue & Gray. This proved to be popular, and SPI immediately produced further quadrigames. In 1978, SPI released The Great War in the East, and it proved popular, immediately rising to #8 on SPI's Top Ten Bestseller List, and remaining on the list for the next eight months. Each of the four games, including Von Hindenburg in Poland, designed by Anthony Beavers and featuring graphic design by Redmond A. Simonsen, was also released as an individual "folio" game, packaged in an LP-style cardstock folder.

== Reception ==
In Issue 23 of the British wargaming magazine Phoenix, Andrew McGee felt that this game was "the most mobile of the four in the [quadrigame] and thus perhaps the least typical of First World War warfare." McGee concluded, "The Russians do appear surprisingly efficient, but the game is strong on history, as well as maintaining interest right up to the end."

Rick Mataka, writing in Craft, Model, and Hobby Industry Magazine, commented, "This is not the standard trench warfare battle that is often thought of [in World War I wargames]. Movement and envelopment are key factors to the victor of this historical battle." Mataka warned that the game was "Of intermediate complexity" and was not suitable for "those with limited boardgaming experience."

In Issue 3 of the French games magazine Casus Belli, Frédéric Armand noted "It is fortunate that the official Errata provides the exact locations of the supply depots [which were missing from the original rules]. Apart from this minor incident, the game is mobile, it may be the least typical of the First World War."

In Issue 16 of Paper Wars, Robert Lindsay commented, "The tactical competence rating runs through all the rules and show the strengths of each army in general and the superior features of the German army in particular."

In a retrospective review in Issue 6 of Simulacrum, Brandon Einhorn called the limited intelligence rules that allowed German hidden movement "fun". Einhorn concluded by giving a grade of "B", saying, "While the package is good, it's not great."
