= Jutland (board game) =

1967 WWI board wargame

- Jutland box cover
- Designers: Jim Dunnigan
- Publishers: Avalon Hill
- Publication: 1967
- Genres: Board game, tactical wargame

Jutland is a naval board wargame published by Avalon Hill in 1967 that simulates the Battle of Jutland in the North Sea during World War I. Upon its release, Jutland was commended for its gameplay and mechanics, but criticism surrounded the complex rules and playing time.

== Background ==
During World War I, Britain's naval forces had successfully blockaded German access to the North Sea and the Atlantic. The German High Seas Fleet was not powerful enough to face the British Grand Fleet, but in late May 1916, German Vice-Admiral Reinhard Scheer took the fleet to sea, hoping to lure a portion of the British fleet within range of the entire German fleet and destroy it. Instead, although the Germans sank a number of British battlecruisers, the entire German fleet itself was lured within range of the British fleet, resulting in the only major fleet-to-fleet action of the war. Although British forces lost more ships that the Germans during the battle, the German fleet withdrew back to their bases and never seriously threatened the British blockade again.

== Description ==
Jutland is a 2-player game, one player controlling the British Grand Fleet, and the other player controlling the German High Seas Fleet. The game does not use a hex grid map, but rather uses measurements made by rulers or tape measures, similar to miniatures wargames. This requires a flat surface of at least 4 ft x 5 ft (1.3 m x 1.5 m).

=== Components ===
The 1967 game box contains:

- "Battle Manual" rulebook
- "Easy-to-Follow" instructions
- 102 die cut counters
- various cards and player aids
- pad of British Hit Records and Fleet Search maps
- pad of German Hit Records and Fleet Search maps
- six-sided die

=== Gameplay ===
The game operates at both a strategic level during the search phase, and a tactical level once the fleets have engaged.

At the strategic level, the players use pencil marks on a hex grid map of the North Sea to search for the other fleet.

Once the fleets have found each other, the game switches to the tactical level, which has no map board. Instead, fleets of die-cut counters are placed at scale distances from each other, much like a miniatures wargame. Ships move at scale speeds using special rulers provided in the game box, and firing ranges are determined by rulers or tape measures. The game provides custom rulers for determining movement.

=== Victory conditions ===
- The British win as soon as German losses in capital ships are more than three times those of the British; or if all German capital ships retreat back to port and the British do not lose more capital ships that the Germans.
- The Germans win as soon as they sink just as many British capital ships as they themselves lose; or if the British fail to drive all German capital ships back to port within 30 hours of being spotted by the British.
- A draw occurs if neither side meets their victory conditions, or neither side returns to port before they reach their refuelling time limit.

== Publication history ==
Jutland was Jim Dunnigan's first wargame. In 1966, he was editor of a wargame zine titled Kampff, as well as a contributor to Avalon Hill's house publication The General. In one of his contributions, Dunnigan levelled major criticisms of lack of historical accuracy at Avalon Hill's 1965 release, Battle of the Bulge. Thomas Shaw, at the time in charge of Avalon Hill, asked Dunnigan to design and submit his own wargame. The result was Jutland, published by Avalon Hill in 1967. Although Jutland initially sold well, the editors of The General were deluged with questions about the new game system. Enthusiasm for the complex game quickly died down, and Avalon Hill discontinued it. Dean E. Miller attributed this to the game's complexity, which, in the early days of board wargaming, was "just too tough for the mass market."

In 1969, after designing other games for Avalon Hill including 1914, Jim Dunnigan went on to found Simulations Publications Inc. (SPI), which would become the major wargame publisher of the 1970s and Avalon Hill's chief rival.

Avalon Hill tried to revive Jutland by revising the rules to address some of the complexities, and released the second edition in 1974. Once again, the game initially sold well, but dropped into obscurity by the end of the 1970s.

Jutland's rules were reimplemented in Lensman (1969), the first sci-fi theme wargame.

== Reception ==
In Issue 4 of the UK magazine Games & Puzzles, (August 1972), game designer Don Turnbull noted that "Jutland players tend to wear out the knees of their trousers crawling round the dining room floor." Because of the large floor space needed, he warned that it could cause problems for those who shared a home with parents or a spouse: "The game is interesting and exciting, but can be lengthy and yet another source of annoyance in the happy home." He concluded, "It is, of course, a must for naval enthusiasts." Several issues later, Turnbull added, "There's a lot to be said for Jutland — it is most interesting as a team game, with four or five commanders per side, each commanding a task force."

In Issue 24 of Moves, Steve List compared Jutland to rival naval wargame Dreadnought (SPI, 1975), and noted that while Dreadnought included several scenarios of various World War I battles, Jutland was devoted to just the single battle, meaning that "Consequently, far more attention is paid to setting the scene, making this phase of the game nearly as complex as the tactical resolution of combat." List also pointed out that Jutland "takes much longer to play, employing a lot of paperwork. It is also badly inaccurate insofar as scale is concerned." But List found that Jutland was more accurate in terms of pre-combat maneuvers. List concluded that "Dreadnought is more convenient to play, while Jutland has more to offer the naval enthusiast."

In A Player's Guide to Table Games, John Jackson noted that a large surface was needed ("a basketball court is perfect") and warned "You may object to crawling around on the floor, and the carefully plotted formations are particularly vulnerable to dogs, cats, children and other natural hazards." Nevertheless he concluded, "for all that, even the advanced rules are logical and easy to understand, and it's fun."

In his 1977 book The Comprehensive Guide to Board Wargaming, Nicholas Palmer thought the rules revisions of the second edition improved a number of small points. He thought the hidden movement of the search procedure was "well done", but noted the "many complex rules [that] govern the tactical combat and engagement procedure." He concluded by warning that the games were long, saying, "Six hours plus: plenty of time for naval buffs to get their teeth into, but a bit different from normal wargames."

In the 1980 book The Complete Book of Wargames, game designer Jon Freeman called Jutland "a novelty" but admitted "it has taken its share of flak since." He thought the game had flaws, especially that "the strategic half of the game [...] is anticlimactic at best; the game doesn't get going until the ships are placed on the maneuvering surface." He did warn that the game "requires a great deal of time and room; formations are subject to disruptions by pets, children, or a misplaced foot." However, Freeman concluded by giving an Overall Evaluation of "Good", saying, "It's fun, and the 'feel' of naval warfare is unmatched by any other game of the modern period."

In the July 2000 edition of The Boardgamer, Alan Arvold said that in 1967 Jutland was responsible for "turning the wargaming hobby on its ear. Here was a game with no game board, unheard of at the time." However, Arvold thought the 1974 second edition was a weaker game, suggesting that the rules revisions "really took more out of it than it left in."

Henry Lowood called Jutland "a scholarly treatise in the form of a game." He ascribed the game's complexity to game designer Jim Dunnigan's penchant for historical accuracy at the cost of playability, saying, "Dunnigan's commitment to historical simulation trumped easy game play."

== Other recognition ==
A copy of Jutland (1967 edition) is held in the collection of the U.S. Navy Department Library.

== Other reviews and commentary ==
- Panzerfaust #66
