= Dreadnought (naval wargame) =

1975 naval board wargame

Surface Combat in the Battleship Era, 1906-45
- Cover of the flat-box version, 1975
- Designers: John Michael Young; Irad B. Hardy, III
- Publishers: Simulations Publications, Inc.
- Years active: 1975
- Players: 2
- Playing time: 120 minutes
- Age range: 12 and up

Dreadnought, subtitled "Surface Combat in the Battleship Era, 1906-45", is a naval board wargame published by Simulations Publications, Inc. (SPI) in 1975.

== Description ==
Dreadnought is a wargame that simulates battles between battleships.

=== Components ===
The game includes:

- Six 10" x 10.75" plain hex grid map sections scaled to 1800 m (1968 yd) per hex
- 400 die-cut counters
- 16-page rulebook
- 2 Player Aid Cards
- Orders Pad
- two 6-sided dice

=== Gameplay ===
Counters are provided for every battleship that sailed from 1906 to 1945. Several historical and hypothetical scenarios are provided. Each game turn represents 15 minutes in the battle. Elements of pre-radar ship-to-ship combat are present, including rangefinding, torpedoes, gunnery, and damage control. If ships sail off the edge of the map, another map piece is placed so that the map is extended in that direction.

=== Scenarios ===
The game comes with 7 scenarios:

1. Dogger Bank (24 January 1915)
2. Denmark Strait (24 May 1941)
3. North Cape, (26 December 1943)
4. Singora (10 December 1941), a hypothetical clash between British task force of HMS Prince of Wales and HMS Repulse, and elements of the Japanese fleet led by Kongō and Haruna
5. Surigao Strait (25 October 1944)
6. Guam (1935), a hypothetical action between the American and Japanese battelfleets
7. Jutland (31 May 1916)

== Publication history ==
Dreadnought was designed by Irad B. Hardy and John Young, with artwork by Redmond A. Simonsen. It was published by SPI in 1975 as a full-sized boxed set and as a flat-box with a clear plastic lid. It was a bestselling game for SPI, rising to the top of SPI's Top 10 list the month after it was released, and staying in the Top 10 for a year.

== Reception ==
In a 1976 poll of wargamers conducted by SPI to determine the most popular wargames published in North America, Dreadnought was very popular, placing 7th out of 202 games.

In Issue 2 of Perfidious Albion, Charles Vasey didn't like the 'North Cape' scenario, noting it was "not a good scenario", and pointing out the set up issues that resulted in non-historical results. But Vasey found the Jutland scenario "works pretty well." Vasey concluded "I found Dreadnought a very interesting game, giving an apparently realistic simulation of surface naval combat ... it gives me pretty well all I wanted."

In Issue 54 of Games & Puzzles (November 1976), Nick Palmer noted that this game was more of an operational game than a tactical game, but still felt the game had "sudden changes in fortune and tension over every salvo." He commented that the interest of the game was increased by "an unusually well-thought-out set of scenarios, with some particularly attractive campaign versions allowing the players to choose their own forces for various specified tasks." He concluded by giving the game an above-average Excitement rating of 4 out of 5. In his 1977 book The Comprehensive Guide to Board Wargaming, Palmer continued in this vein, calling Dreadnought "an excellent game" and noting "Rather unusually in a naval game, the accent is on playability rather than enormous detail, and the result is fast-moving and frequently tensely exciting."

In Issue 24 of Moves, Steve List compared Dreadnought to Avalon Hill's Jutland, and found that complex maneuvering in Jutland is difficult, but "since [Dreadnought's] mechanics of movement are simple and straight-forward. intricate maneuvers are quite feasible and can be considered the main point of the game." While List found that "Dreadnought is far more convenient to play", he thought that "Anyone interested in naval warfare should have both games in his collection."

In The Guide to Simulations/Games for Education and Training, Martin Campion thought this game could be adapted to the classroom, saying, "The game does not provide for multiple players but there is a lot of room to introduce more than one on a side."

== Other reviews ==
- The Wargamer, Vol.2 #24
- Phoenix #23
- Pursue & Destroy Vol.3, #1
