= The Great War in the East =

World War I board wargame published in 1978

The Great War in the East, subtitled "Four World War I Battles", is a collection of four board wargames published by Simulations Publications Inc. (SPI) in 1978 that simulates four battles of World War I on the Eastern Front and the Italian/Austrian front.

== Background ==
While the static trench warfare of the Western Front remains the defining image of World War I, combat on other fronts was more fluid. These included combat between Russia and Germany, Italy and Austria, and Austro-Hungary and Russia.

== Description ==
The Great War in the East is a quadrigame — four separate wargames packaged in the same box that use the same rules. Each is a two-player game focused on a battle that is not associated with the Western Front:

- Serbia/Galicia: Austria-Hungary at War, 1914 (designed by Jay Nelson): Austria-Hungary has a two-front war on its hands, and must decide how to allocate resources to fight both Serbia to the west and Russia to the east.
- Von Hindenburg in Poland (designed by Anthony Beavers): Russia and Germany meet in Silesia and Poland.
- The Brusilov Offensive: Imperial Russia's Last Campaign (designed by Jim Dunnigan): Russian General Aleksei Brusilov launches a major Russian offensive against Germany.
- Caporetto, 1917 (designed by Albert Nofi): Austria breaks through the Italian lines.

In addition to the sheet of rules common to all four games and a historical background by Richard Spence, each game has 200 double-sided die-cut counters, one 22" x 17" paper hex grid map, and a sheet of additional rules that are unique to that game.

=== Gameplay ===
The game mechanics use a simple "I Go, You Go" alternating turn system, where one player moves and fires, followed by the other player. When both players have moved, this completes one game turn, which represents 3 days.

Unlike earlier simpler quadrigames, these games have the added complication that all units must be supplied and lie within a certain number of hexes of their Command Headquarters in order to move and attack.

The games also added a Tactical Efficiency Rating to each unit, what critic Brandon Einhorn called "an early attempt in the wargaming field to differentiate units by means other than just combat strength. It affects combat, supply, command control, cavalry withdrawal and other functions, and is a simple way of differentiating well-trained veterans from poorly-led militia."

== Publication history ==
In 1975, SPI published its first quadrigame, Blue & Gray. This proved to be popular, and SPI immediately produced further quadrigames. In 1978, as a promotional item for the soon-to-be-released The Great War in the East, SPI published a game that used the same rules, Tannenberg, as a free pull-out game in the July–August 1978 issue of Strategy & Tactics. A month later, SPI released The Great War in the East, and it proved popular, immediately rising to #8 on SPI's Top Ten Bestseller List, and remaining on the list for the next eight months. Each of the four games was also released as an individual "folio" game, packaged in an LP-style cardstock folder.

After the demise of SPI, Decision Games acquired the rights to The Great War in the East, and republished it, but only included two of the games: The Brusilov Offensive and Serbia/Galicia.

== Reception ==
Rick Mataka, writing in Craft, Model, and Hobby Industry Magazine, commented, "These were not the standard trench warfare battles that are often thought of [in World War I wargames]. Movement and envelopment are key factors to the victors of these historical battles." Mataka warned that the games were "Of intermediate complexity" and were not suitable for "those with limited boardgaming experience."

Eric Lawson, writing in The Wargamer, commented, "The Great War in the East makes a great contribution towards breaking the stereotypes associated with simulations of the First World War."

In Issue 23 of the UK wargaming magazine Phoenix, Andrew McGee felt that there were not enough relatively uncomplicated games about World War I, saying, "There is no doubt that this set of games fills a gap in the coverage of the 20th century. Further, the game system is, by contemporary standards at least, fairly simple." However, McGee felt that SPI had missed some opportunities, wishing that there had been some non-historical "what if?" scenarios included with each game. McGee also felt that each of the games failed to adequately demonstrate how the historical result was achieved, saying, "the games give no understanding of why things happened as they did." He concluded, "The system is a sound vessel, but the designers seem to have forgotten to fill it." McGee also reviewed each of the four games:

- Serbia/Galicia: "Certainly this game seems to reflect that no one had really sorted out what was going on; the objectives are limited, as are the capabilities of the armies. This is a very frustrating game."
- Von Hindenburg in Poland: "This game is perhaps the most mobile of the four in the quad and thus perhaps the least typical of First World War warfare. [...] The game is strong on history, as well as maintaining interest right up to the end."
- The Brusilov Offensive: "The game is about destroying enemy units and taking terrain, but this goes on, if at all, in a complete vacuum. [...] for the player the problem is that there is no apparent reason to conduct this offensive."
- Caporetto: "This is the cleanest of the games from the rules point of view, but does little to explain why Caporetto happened as it did."

In Issue 16 of Paper Wars, Robert Lindsay commented, "The games themselves have some balance problems, but cover battles not examined before or since, in an interesting way. The tactical competence rating runs through all the rules and show the strengths of each army in general and the superior features of the German army in particular."

In a retrospective review in Issue 6 of Simulacrum, Brandon Einhorn commented, "Some of the games work much better than others. In my opinion, Tanneberg is the best of the lot, and Serbia/Galicia is the worst. It's not much fun launching frontal offensives against an enemy in trenches that can eventually withdraw." Einhorn concluded by giving this set of games a grade of "B", saying, "While the package is good, it's not great. The games can have a static and bloody feel to them, which may be realistic, but not as much fun as a game of maneuver."

== Other reviews and commentary ==
- The Wargamer Vol.1, #10
- Casus Belli (Issue 3 - Feb 1981)
