= Ca (Javanese) =

Syllable in Javanese script

ca
- ꦕ
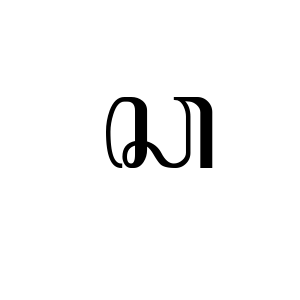
- Aksara nglegena

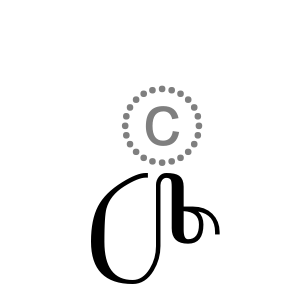
- Aksara pasangan

Usage
- Writing system: Javanese script
- Latin orthography: ca
- Sound values: [tʃ]
- In Unicode: A995

ꦕ is a character in the Javanese script that represents the sound /tʃɔ/ or /tʃa/. It is transliterated to Latin as "ca", and sometimes in Indonesian orthography as "co". It has another form (pasangan), which is ◌꧀ꦕ, but both forms represented by a single Unicode code point, U+A995.

== Pasangan ==
Its pasangan form ◌꧀ꦕ is attached to the underside of the previous syllable, as in ꦲꦤꦏ꧀ꦕꦕꦶꦁ anak cacing (little worm).

== Murda ==
The letter ꦕ has a murda form, which is ꦖ.

== Glyphs ==
Nglegena forms				Pasangan forms			
ꦕ ca	ꦕꦃ cah	ꦕꦁ cang	ꦕꦂ car	◌꧀ꦕ -ca	◌꧀ꦕꦃ -cah	◌꧀ꦕꦁ -cang	◌꧀ꦕꦂ -car
ꦕꦺ ce	ꦕꦺꦃ ceh	ꦕꦺꦁ ceng	ꦕꦺꦂ cer	◌꧀ꦕꦺ -ce	◌꧀ꦕꦺꦃ -ceh	◌꧀ꦕꦺꦁ -ceng	◌꧀ꦕꦺꦂ -cer
ꦕꦼ cê	ꦕꦼꦃ cêh	ꦕꦼꦁ cêng	ꦕꦼꦂ cêr	◌꧀ꦕꦼ -cê	◌꧀ꦕꦼꦃ -cêh	◌꧀ꦕꦼꦁ -cêng	◌꧀ꦕꦼꦂ -cêr
ꦕꦶ ci	ꦕꦶꦃ cih	ꦕꦶꦁ cing	ꦕꦶꦂ cir	◌꧀ꦕꦶ -ci	◌꧀ꦕꦶꦃ -cih	◌꧀ꦕꦶꦁ -cing	◌꧀ꦕꦶꦂ -cir
ꦕꦺꦴ co	ꦕꦺꦴꦃ coh	ꦕꦺꦴꦁ cong	ꦕꦺꦴꦂ cor	◌꧀ꦕꦺꦴ -co	◌꧀ꦕꦺꦴꦃ -coh	◌꧀ꦕꦺꦴꦁ -cong	◌꧀ꦕꦺꦴꦂ -cor
ꦕꦸ cu	ꦕꦸꦃ cuh	ꦕꦸꦁ cung	ꦕꦸꦂ cur	◌꧀ꦕꦸ -cu	◌꧀ꦕꦸꦃ -cuh	◌꧀ꦕꦸꦁ -cung	◌꧀ꦕꦸꦂ -cur
ꦕꦿ cra	ꦕꦿꦃ crah	ꦕꦿꦁ crang	ꦕꦿꦂ crar	◌꧀ꦕꦿ -cra	◌꧀ꦕꦿꦃ -crah	◌꧀ꦕꦿꦁ -crang	◌꧀ꦕꦿꦂ -crar
ꦕꦿꦺ cre	ꦕꦿꦺꦃ creh	ꦕꦿꦺꦁ creng	ꦕꦿꦺꦂ crer	◌꧀ꦕꦿꦺ -cre	◌꧀ꦕꦿꦺꦃ -creh	◌꧀ꦕꦿꦺꦁ -creng	◌꧀ꦕꦿꦺꦂ -crer
ꦕꦽ crê	ꦕꦽꦃ crêh	ꦕꦽꦁ crêng	ꦕꦽꦂ crêr	◌꧀ꦕꦽ -crê	◌꧀ꦕꦽꦃ -crêh	◌꧀ꦕꦽꦁ -crêng	◌꧀ꦕꦽꦂ -crêr
ꦕꦿꦶ cri	ꦕꦿꦶꦃ crih	ꦕꦿꦶꦁ cring	ꦕꦿꦶꦂ crir	◌꧀ꦕꦿꦶ -cri	◌꧀ꦕꦿꦶꦃ -crih	◌꧀ꦕꦿꦶꦁ -cring	◌꧀ꦕꦿꦶꦂ -crir
ꦕꦿꦺꦴ cro	ꦕꦿꦺꦴꦃ croh	ꦕꦿꦺꦴꦁ crong	ꦕꦿꦺꦴꦂ cror	◌꧀ꦕꦿꦺꦴ -cro	◌꧀ꦕꦿꦺꦴꦃ -croh	◌꧀ꦕꦿꦺꦴꦁ -crong	◌꧀ꦕꦿꦺꦴꦂ -cror
ꦕꦿꦸ cru	ꦕꦿꦸꦃ cruh	ꦕꦿꦸꦁ crung	ꦕꦿꦸꦂ crur	◌꧀ꦕꦿꦸ -cru	◌꧀ꦕꦿꦸꦃ -cruh	◌꧀ꦕꦿꦸꦁ -crung	◌꧀ꦕꦿꦸꦂ -crur
ꦕꦾ cya	ꦕꦾꦃ cyah	ꦕꦾꦁ cyang	ꦕꦾꦂ cyar	◌꧀ꦕꦾ -cya	◌꧀ꦕꦾꦃ -cyah	◌꧀ꦕꦾꦁ -cyang	◌꧀ꦕꦾꦂ -cyar
ꦕꦾꦺ cye	ꦕꦾꦺꦃ cyeh	ꦕꦾꦺꦁ cyeng	ꦕꦾꦺꦂ cyer	◌꧀ꦕꦾꦺ -cye	◌꧀ꦕꦾꦺꦃ -cyeh	◌꧀ꦕꦾꦺꦁ -cyeng	◌꧀ꦕꦾꦺꦂ -cyer
ꦕꦾꦼ cyê	ꦕꦾꦼꦃ cyêh	ꦕꦾꦼꦁ cyêng	ꦕꦾꦼꦂ cyêr	◌꧀ꦕꦾꦼ -cyê	◌꧀ꦕꦾꦼꦃ -cyêh	◌꧀ꦕꦾꦼꦁ -cyêng	◌꧀ꦕꦾꦼꦂ -cyêr
ꦕꦾꦶ cyi	ꦕꦾꦶꦃ cyih	ꦕꦾꦶꦁ cying	ꦕꦾꦶꦂ cyir	◌꧀ꦕꦾꦶ -cyi	◌꧀ꦕꦾꦶꦃ -cyih	◌꧀ꦕꦾꦶꦁ -cying	◌꧀ꦕꦾꦶꦂ -cyir
ꦕꦾꦺꦴ cyo	ꦕꦾꦺꦴꦃ cyoh	ꦕꦾꦺꦴꦁ cyong	ꦕꦾꦺꦴꦂ cyor	◌꧀ꦕꦾꦺꦴ -cyo	◌꧀ꦕꦾꦺꦴꦃ -cyoh	◌꧀ꦕꦾꦺꦴꦁ -cyong	◌꧀ꦕꦾꦺꦴꦂ -cyor
ꦕꦾꦸ cyu	ꦕꦾꦸꦃ cyuh	ꦕꦾꦸꦁ cyung	ꦕꦾꦸꦂ cyur	◌꧀ꦕꦾꦸ -cyu	◌꧀ꦕꦾꦸꦃ -cyuh	◌꧀ꦕꦾꦸꦁ -cyung	◌꧀ꦕꦾꦸꦂ -cyur

== Unicode block ==
Javanese script was added to the Unicode Standard in October, 2009 with the release of version 5.2.

Javanese^{[1]}^{[2]} Official Unicode Consortium code chart (PDF)
	0	1	2	3	4	5	6	7	8	9	A	B	C	D	E	F
U+A98x	ꦀ	ꦁ	ꦂ	ꦃ	ꦄ	ꦅ	ꦆ	ꦇ	ꦈ	ꦉ	ꦊ	ꦋ	ꦌ	ꦍ	ꦎ	ꦏ
U+A99x	ꦐ	ꦑ	ꦒ	ꦓ	ꦔ	ꦕ	ꦖ	ꦗ	ꦘ	ꦙ	ꦚ	ꦛ	ꦜ	ꦝ	ꦞ	ꦟ
U+A9Ax	ꦠ	ꦡ	ꦢ	ꦣ	ꦤ	ꦥ	ꦦ	ꦧ	ꦨ	ꦩ	ꦪ	ꦫ	ꦬ	ꦭ	ꦮ	ꦯ
U+A9Bx	ꦰ	ꦱ	ꦲ	꦳	ꦴ	ꦵ	ꦶ	ꦷ	ꦸ	ꦹ	ꦺ	ꦻ	ꦼ	ꦽ	ꦾ	ꦿ
U+A9Cx	꧀	꧁	꧂	꧃	꧄	꧅	꧆	꧇	꧈	꧉	꧊	꧋	꧌	꧍		ꧏ
U+A9Dx	꧐	꧑	꧒	꧓	꧔	꧕	꧖	꧗	꧘	꧙					꧞	꧟
Notes 1.As of Unicode version 17.0 2.Grey areas indicate non-assigned code points

== See also ==
- Ca (Indic)
