= HMS Repulse =

Twelve ships of the Royal Navy have been named HMS Repulse:

- English ship Repulse (1596) was a 50-gun galleon also known as Due Repulse, launched in 1595 and in the records until 1645.
- HMS Repulse (1759) was a 32-gun fifth rate, originally the Bellone. She was captured in 1759 by HMS Vestal and foundered in 1776.
- HMS Repulse (1779) was a 10-gun cutter purchased in 1779 and in the records until 1781.
- HMS Repulse (1780) was a 64-gun third rate launched in 1780 and wrecked in 1800.
- HMS Repulse (1780 cutter) was a 12-gun cutter purchased in 1780 and wrecked in 1782.
- HMS Repulse (1794) was a 4-gun vessel purchased in 1794 and broken up a year later.
- HMS Repulse (1803) was a 74-gun third rate launched in 1803 and broken up in 1820.
- HMS Repulse was a screw-propelled 91-gun second rate launched on 27 February 1855 as HMS Repulse but renamed HMS Victor Emmanuel on 7 December 1855, used as a receiving ship after 1873, and sold in 1899.
- HMS Repulse (1868) was an ironclad ship launched in 1868 and sold in 1889.
- HMS Repulse (1892) was a Royal Sovereign-class battleship launched in 1892 and sold in 1911.
- HMS Repulse (1916) was a Renown-class battlecruiser launched in 1916 and sunk in a Japanese air attack in 1941.
- HMS Repulse (S23) was a Resolution-class submarine launched in 1967 and laid up in 1997.

== Battle honours ==
- Cadiz, 1596
- Martinique, 1762
- The Saints, 1782
- Atlantic, 1939–40
- Norway, 1940
- Bismarck, 1941
