= 1914 (game) =

WWI board wargame published in 1968

- Designers: Jim Dunnigan
- Publishers: Avalon Hill
- Publication: 1968
- Genres: WWI

1914 is a board wargame published by Avalon Hill in 1968 that simulates the first few months of World War I on the Western Front.

== Description ==
1914 is a two-player corps-level simulation of the first few weeks of World War I on the Western Front. With a 22 in × 28 in (56 cm × 71 cm) mounted hex grid game map, almost 400 double-sided die-cut counters, a mobilization chart pad for secret deployment, and various charts and instructions including a Battle Manual, the game was considered highly complex.

The game scale is 2 days per turn, with approximately 16 km per hex. The map covers the terrain from Mainz, Germany in the east to Le Havre, France in the west, and from the southern portion of the Netherlands in the north to the northern edge of Switzerland in the south. The terrain includes major rivers, ridge lines, rough terrain, forest, and the sea. It also displays the location of cities, fortifications, economic sites, mobilization squares, and railroads.

== Standard game ==
=== Setup ===
A few units on each side are required to be set up in specific hexes, such as French infantry corps in Toul, but the remainder can be placed in any friendly hex via secret deployment that is not revealed until the first turn of the game.

=== Gameplay ===
The game uses a traditional "I Go, You Go" series of alternating turns, with first the German and then Allied player moving and then firing.

=== Combat ===
The combat and movement rating of each unit is given on the front of the counter. These ratings are reduced in a series of steps as a result of combat or lack of supply until the unit is finally destroyed. Both players also receive step replacements that can be used to rebuild units that have taken losses, as long as the unit is in supply and some distance from an enemy unit.

Combat is based on an odds ratio between the attacking units Attack Rating and the defending unit's Defense Rating.

Infantry can attack a fortress, but will incur damage and only have a minimal chance of success. The German player also has the option of using their artillery to destroy a fortress, which increases the odds of success. Although the most powerful artillery in the game is the German railroad gun, it is limited in range since it cannot leave rail lines.

=== Movement ===
There are no zone of control rules. Units can move their indicated movement factor during a turn, with higher movement cost for certain types of terrain. No more than two corps can end their movement in the same hex, and only one of the corps can defend a hex.

=== Supply ===
In order to move and attack, a unit needs to be in supply, defined as being able to trace a line no more than three hexes to a friendly railroad line. Enemy units can block supply lines, but only in the hex they occupy.

== Advanced rules ==
Players can choose to use some or all of the advanced rules:

- Facing: Using the arrow printed on the back of each counter, a unit can only move in the direction of the arrow. Turning the unit in the direction desired costs one movement factor. Units attacked from the side or the rear do not defend as well.
- Game variation cards can produce non-historical "what if?" effects, such as modifying the size of the Belgian and Dutch armies, varying the effectiveness of the British force, etc.

Other optional rules include more complex supply rules, cavalry probes, amphibious attack, retreat before combat, dummy counters, and variable time limits for game completion are a few of the other optional rules.

== Publication history ==
In 1966, Jim Dunnigan was editor of a wargame zine titled Kampff, as well as a contributor to Avalon Hill's house publication The General. In one of his contributions, Dunnigan levelled major criticisms of lack of historical accuracy at Avalon Hill's 1965 release, Battle of the Bulge. Thomas Shaw, at the time in charge of Avalon Hill, asked Dunnigan to design and submit his own wargame. The result was Jutland, published by Avalon Hill in 1967. The following year, Avalon Hill published another Dunnigan game, 1914. The game sold well, but due to concerns about its complexity, and fearful the game would discourage new players from buying more products, Avalon Hill discontinued the game in 1973.

Dunnigan went on to found Simulations Publications Inc. (SPI) in 1969, which would become the major wargame publisher of the 1970s and Avalon Hill's chief rival. One of Dunnigan's first SPI games was 1914 Revision Kit, in which he supplied new and simpler rules and new counters; a copy of the original Avalon Hill game map was required for play. Dunnigan also designed and released Tannenberg, a board wargame about the Eastern Front that used the same rule system as 1914. It was designed to be a companion game to 1914, and Dunnigan also included rules on how to combine the two games into one giant game about August 1914 on both the Western and Eastern fronts.

== Reception ==
In Issue 25 of Albion, game designer Don Turnbull called 1914 "something of a monster which many deem as unplayable in its full version." Turnbull went on to review Dunnigan's Revision Kit, and welcomed the new streamlined rules, saying, "It will make the original 1914 game much more palatable, particularly to the relatively inexperienced player." Two years later, Turnbull reiterated that this was "the first game whose complexity is innate" and noted that "The game has few admirers, and quite an array of critics." Although he felt "the game can be an excellent simulation and a fine game for those with patience", he also agreed with critics of the game about "the awkward play mechanics." He concluded "1914 is certainly not for the faint-hearted."

In Avalon Hill's own company history, 1914 was characterized as

a sales success. Unfortunately, it was a lousy game. The mapboard, though innovative for its day, was an unplayable monstrosity and the rules suffered from being incomplete. Perhaps it was too good a simulation in reflecting the trench warfare of World War One because it sure wasn't much fun to play. Convinced that it was losing [Avalon Hill] long range customers, the game was discontinued despite continuing relatively strong sales.

== Reviews ==
- Panzerfaust #56
