= Current account =

Current account or Current Account may refer to:

- Current account (balance of payments), a country's balance of trade, net of factor income and cash transfers
- Current account (banking), a checking account, held at a bank or other financial institution
- Current account mortgage, a type of flexible mortgage loan
- Current Account (TV programme), a British current affairs television programme that was broadcast in the 1970s and 1980s on BBC in Scotland
