= Circa =

Circa or CIRCA may refer to:

- Circa, a common Latin phrase for denoting an approximate date
- CIRCA (art platform), in London
- Circa (band), a progressive rock supergroup
- Circa (company), an American skateboard footwear company
- Circa (contemporary circus), an Australian contemporary circus company
- Circa District, Peru
- Circa, a disc-binding notebook system
- Circa Theatre, in New Zealand
- Clandestine Insurgent Rebel Clown Army, a UK activist group
- Circa News, an online news and entertainment service
- Circa Complex, twin skyscrapers in Los Angeles, California
- Circa (Michael Cain album), 1997
- Circa (Mary's Danish album), 1991
- Circa Resort & Casino, a hotel in Las Vegas
