= Communication art =

Communication art or Communication arts can refer to:

- Advertising and Public relations – the use of marketing communications, channels, and tools to convey a message to a market
- Communication design – a broad scoped mixed discipline approach to design and information-development concerned with how media and presentations communicate with people. This may include audio with or without visual art
  - Visual communication – communication through visual aid and the conveyance of ideas and information in forms that can be read or looked upon
  - Visual arts – art forms that create works that are primarily visual in nature
  - Sound design – the process of specifying, acquiring, manipulating or generating audio elements.
- Communication Arts (magazine) – the largest international trade journal of visual communications
