= Tannenberg (wargame) =

Board wargame published in 1969

The cover of Strategy & Tactics #69, which featured the 1978 edition of Tannenberg as a pull-out game. Paul von Hindenburg and Erich Ludendorff stand at the front of the picture.

Tannenberg is a board wargame published by Simulations Publications Inc. (SPI) in 1969 that simulates the Battle of Tannenberg on World War I's Eastern Front. The game was created by game designer Jim Dunnigan as a companion piece for Avalon Hill's Western Front wargame 1914, also designed by Dunnigan. Although Tannenberg could be played as a standalone game, rules were included to combine it and 1914 into a two-front wargame. Nine years later, Tannenberg was completely revised and republished as a free pull-out game in SPI's house magazine Strategy & Tactics to promote SPI's upcoming release of The Great War in the East. The second edition was also sold as a standalone game.

== Background ==
At the start of the Great War in August 1914, Germany was fighting a two-front war, facing France in the west and Russia in the east. As two large Russian armies moved into East Prussia — led by two generals (Paul von Rennenkampf and Alexander Samsonov) who refused to communicate with each other about their positions and strategies — Germany used its large network of rails to quickly move high concentrations of troops into positions that allowed them to encircle the Russian Second Army in the vicinity of Tannenberg (now Stębark in Poland), site of a famous defeat of the Teutonic Knights in 1410.

== Description ==
Tannenberg is a two-player wargame where one player controls Russian forces, and the other player controls the German forces.

The 1969 edition uses a simple "I Go, You Go" alternating turn system taken from Avalon Hill's 1914, where one player moves and fires, followed by the other player. When both players have moved, this completes one game turn, which represents 3 days.

In the 1978 edition, the game mechanics have been revised to be identical to those used in SPI's The Great War in the East, a collection of wargames about battles on the Eastern Front. An alternating turn system is still used, but in addition, all units must be supplied and within a certain number of hexes of their Command Headquarters in order to move and attack. The game also puts emphasis on tactical capabilities — every unit has a rating that affects all of their actions. There is also a provision for three players — one player plays the German side, and the other two each control one of the Russian armies, with the proviso that the Russian players cannot communicate with each other unless the German player can also listen.

== Publication history ==
In 1969, SPI co-founder Jim Dunnigan created a Test Series of wargames to test the market for small, fast, cheap games. To reduce costs, the Test Series games were packaged in ziplock bags with thin paper counters, small single-color paper hex grid maps, and typewritten rules. One of these was Tannenberg, a game about the Eastern Front battle that was specifically designed to be a companion piece to 1914, a wargame that Dunnigan had designed for Avalon Hill that focused on the first few weeks on the Western Front.

In 1978, SPI prepared to publish The Great War in the East. As a promotional item, SPI decided to publish a free companion game in Strategy & Tactics that would use the same rules set as The Great War in the East. David Isbie took Dunnigan's old Tannenberg game and adapted it to the new rules set. The result, Tannenberg: The Opening Battles in the East, 1914, was published as a pull-out game in the July-August 1978 issue of Strategy & Tactics, a month before the release of The Great War in the East. Tannenberg was also offered for sale as a boxed set.

== Reception ==
In Issue 25 of Albion, game designer Don Turnbull reviewed the 1969 edition and grumbled about several gaps in the rules, commenting "Tannenberg has been thrown together in a rush, in particular where the rules are concerned. Two instances of glaring omissions will serve to clarify here: nowhere in the rules is any mention made of where each side may deploy units, and nowhere is there any mention of how many supply units each side gets, or where and when they arrive. [...] Such omissions are annoying." Overall, Turnbull didn't find much to like, concluding that there was "little of interest in Tannenberg which is not already displayed, usually better, in other games."

In Issue 14 of Fire & Movement, Friedrich Helfferich noted "This is not a 1914-style slugfest, as some may have feared, but a contest of skillful maneuver, with a gamut of strategic options for both sides and with ample opportunities for tactical finesse." Helfferich concluded, "Tannenberg, in my view, is the best [Strategy & Tactics] game to have come out since Panzergruppe Guderian."

In The Guide to Simulations/Games for Education and Training, Martin Campion discussed the 1978 edition as an educational aid, but warned "The game is intricate — perhaps too intricate for many classes." However he concluded "The three-player game would be a valuable class exercise."

In the 1980 book The Complete Book of Wargames, game designer Jon Freeman was not impressed with the 1978 edition, calling it "another one of those good-simulation-but-bad-games for which SPI has been notorious." Although Freeman agreed that the game encapsulated the feeling of World War I warfare, he also noted "The restrictions of the supply system and the limited command control lead to massive assaults rather than anything fancy or interesting like encirclements or flanking maneuvers." Freeman concluded by giving the game an Overall Evaluation of "Fair to Good", saying, "As a solitaire simulation for the historian, this will do nicely (once or twice), but as a contest Tannenberg falls far short of the mark."

== Other reviews and commentary ==
- Fire & Movement #14
