= List of Sinhala words of Portuguese origin =

Sinhala words of Portuguese origin came about during the period of Portuguese colonial rule in Sri Lanka between 1505–1658. This period saw rapid absorption of many Portuguese words into the local language brought about by the interaction between Portuguese colonials and the Sinhalese people, mainly in the coastal areas of the island. A wide variety of words were adopted from administrative terms to military terms, which reveals several points of contact between the two groups. In addition to influences on language, the Portuguese introduced the Catholic religion to Sri Lanka, various forms of western clothing and also contributed to the formation of Baila, a Sri Lankan form of music.

== Types of loanwords ==
Borrowings

The words pertaining to the fields of commerce, administration, botany, food and military are the most numerous; this is to be expected because of many new innovations and goods that reached Sri Lanka via the Portuguese.

The range of borrowings goes beyond the scope to be expected for a situation where two neighbouring peoples exchange material goods: There are many Portuguese loanwords pertaining to everyday and social life (kinship terms, ordinary activities etc.). Additionally, many lexical words (nouns, adjectives and verbs) have also been borrowed.

== The borrowing process ==
Portuguese loanwords in Sinhala rarely appear in the same form as the original word, the vast majority of them having undergone naturalisation. Usually, a word has undergone some kind of modification to fit into the Sinhala phonological (e.g. bandeja becomes bandesiya because the sound of the Portuguese /j/, does not exist in the Sinhala phoneme inventory) or morphological system (e.g. lenço becomes lensuva because Sinhala inanimate nouns (see grammatical gender) need to end with /a/, [ə], in order to be declineable).

These are the main ways Portuguese words are incorporated into the Sinhala lexicon with different endings:

- With an /ma/ or /na/ or /va/ added to Portuguese words ending in /o/ (e.g. gancho > gāncuva).
- With an /aya/ or /uva/ added to Portuguese words ending in consonants (e.g. lençol > lensōluva).
- With a /ya/ added to words ending in /a/ or /e/ or /i/ (e.g. diamante > diyamantiya).
- With the animate ending /yā/ or /vā/ added to Portuguese words signifying living beings or (e.g. burro > būruvā).

Adjectives that end in vowels are generally preserved in the original form.

There are over 150 words in the following list.

| Sinhala | සිංහල | Meaning | Portuguese | Meaning | Type |
|---|---|---|---|---|---|
| āyā | ආයා | dry nurse | aia | nurse | Daily |
| æbǣrtuva | ඇබෑර්තුව | vacancy | aberto | open, vacant (masculine) | Trade |
| ǣn̆duru | ඈඳුරු | dill | endro | dill | Food |
| agōstu | අගෝස්තු | August | agosto | August | Daily |
| akol | අකොල් | akol | álcool | alcohol | Daily |
| alavaṁguva | අලවංගුව | crow-bar | alavanca | lever | Daily |
| almāna | අල්මාන | Germany | Alemanha | Germany | Daily |
| almāriya | අල්මාරිය | almirah, wardrobe | armário | wardrobe, cabinet | Daily |
| almiya | අල්මිය | storax | almeia | storax | Daily |
| almōsa, alumōsuva | අල්මෝස, අලුමෝසුව | lunch | almoço | lunch | Daily |
| alpenettiya | අල්පෙනෙත්තිය | pin | alfinete | pin | Daily |
| alugōsuvā | අලුගෝසුවා | executioner | algoz | executioner | Administration |
| āmā | ආමා | wet nurse | ama | nurse | Daily |
| amandæl | අමන්දැල් | almond | amêndoa | almond | Food |
| amēsi | අමේසි | plum | ameixa | plum | Fruit |
| anjuvā | අන්ජුවා | angel | anjo | angel | Daily |
| annāsi | අන්නාසි | pineapple | ananás | pineapple | Fruit |
| arumōsam | අරුමෝසම් | decorative, fancy | armação | setting, truss | Daily |
| abulā | අබුලා | grandmother | avó | grandmother | Daily |
| avāna | අවාන | fan | abano | fan | Daily |
| avel (æṭaya) | අවෙල් (ඇටය) | hazel (nut) | avelã | hazelnut | Food |
| asēnti | අසේන්ති | absent | ausente | absent | Daily |
| asnu | අස්නු | rude | asno | ass | Daily |
| baṁkōtiya | බංකෝතිය | banquet | banquete | banquet | Daily |
| bolot | බොලොත් | acorn | bolota | acorn | Daily |
| bāldiya | බාල්දිය | bucket | balde | bucket | Daily |
| bambuva | බම්බුව | bamboo, 'bullcrap' | bambu | bamboo | Daily |
| baṁkalot | බංකලොත් | bankruptcy | bancarrota | bankruptcy | Daily |
| baṁkuva | බංකුව | bench | banco | bench | Daily |
| bandēsiya | බන්දේසිය | tray | bandeja | tray | Daily |
| bastama | බස්තම | walking stick | bastão | stick | Daily |
| bāsu | බාසු | dim | baço | dim | Daily |
| battala | බත්තල | lighter | batelão | lighter | Daily |
| Baila (bayilā) | බයිලා | Portuguese-influenced Sri Lankan music | baila | 3rd person singular present conjugation of "bailar" meaning "to dance" | Music |
| bayinettuva | බයිනෙත්තුව | bayonet | baioneta | bayonet | Military |
| bēbaddā | බේබද්දා | drunkard | bêbado | drunkard (masculine) | Daily |
| bīraḷuva | බීරළුව | bobbin | bilro | bobbin | Daily |
| bispuvā | බිස්පුවා | bishop | bispo | bishop | Daily |
| bōnikkā | බෝනික්කා | doll | boneca | doll | Daily |
| bora | බොර | dreg | borra | dreg | Daily |
| bōrdaya | බෝර්දය | border | borda | brim, border | Daily |
| bostāduva | බොස්තාදුව | slap | bofetada | slap | Daily |
| bottama | බොත්තම | button | botão | button | Daily |
| bula | බුල | bullet | bala | bullet | Military |
| būliya | බූලිය | round jar | bule | teapot | Daily |
| būruvā | බූරුවා | donkey | burro | donkey | Animal |
| būsi | බූසි | wad | bucha | wad | Military |
| cinēlaya | චිනේලය | slipper | chinela | slipper | Clothing |
| dāduva | දාදුව | dice | dado | dice | Daily |
| dāta | දාත | date | data | date | Daily |
| didālaya | දිදාලය | thimble | dedal | thimble | Daily |
| diyamantiya | දියමන්තිය | diamond | diamante | diamond | Daily |
| diyōgu | දියෝගු | James | Diogo | James | Proper Name |
| don | දොන් | Sir/Lord | dom | Sir/Lord | Daily |
| dōnā | දෝනා | Dame | dona | Dame | Daily |
| dōsi | දෝසි | sweet, preserve | doce | sweet | Daily |
| dusima | දුසිම | dozen | dúzia | dozen | Daily |
| emōsiya | එමෝසිය | emotion | emoção | emotion | Daily |
| ēra | ඒර | ivy | hera | ivy | Bottanical |
| esmeri | එස්මෙරි | emery | esmeril | emery | Daily |
| esmuva | එස්මුව | a guess | esmo | random | Daily |
| espāciya | එස්පාචිය | corset | espartilho | corset | Daily |
| espētuva | එස්පේතුව | roasting spit | espeto | spit | Daily |
| espiyā | එස්පියා | spy | espião | spy (masculine) | Daily |
| galappattiya | ගලප්පත්තිය | caulking | calafetagem | caulking | Daily |
| gāncuva | ගාන්චුව | hook (of a belt, bracelet) | gancho | hook | Daily |
| garādiya | ගරාදිය | window grill | grade | grill | Daily |
| gāstuva | ගාස්තුව | fee | gasto | expense | Daily |
| gǣruppuva | ගෑරුප්පුව | fork | garfo | fork | Daily |
| gorōsu | ගොරෝසු | coarse | grosso | thick (masculine) | Descriptive |
| gōvā | ගෝවා | cabbage | couve | cabbage, sprouts | Food |
| hōrāva | හෝරාව | hour | hora | hour | Daily |
| intēru | ඉන්තේරු | entire | inteiro | entire (masculine) | Daily |
| iskōlaya | ඉස්කෝලය | school | escola | school | Daily |
| ispāsuva | ඉස්පාසුව | space | espaço | space | Daily |
| janēlaya | ජනේලය | window | janela | window | Construction |
| jusē | ජුසේ | Joseph | José | Joseph | Proper Name |
| juvām | ජුවාම් | John | João | John | Proper Name |
| kabāya | කබාය | coat | capa | cloak | Daily |
| kabuk | කබුක් | laterite | cabouco | laterite | Daily |
| kābuva | කාබුව | cable | cabo | cable | Daily |
| kayisa | කයිස | platform | cais | platform | Daily |
| kaju | කජු | cashew | caju | cashew | Food |
| kan̆dalēruva | කඳලේරුව | chandelier | candelabro | chandelier | Daily |
| kaldērama | කල්දේරම | cauldron | caldeirão | cauldron | Daily |
| kaldu | කල්දු | broth | caldo | broth | Food |
| kalisama | කලිසම | pants | calção | shorts | Clothing |
| kamisaya | කමිසය | shirt | camisa | shirt | Daily |
| kappādu | කප්පාදු | castrated | capado | castrated (masculine) | Daily |
| kappittā | කප්පිත්තා | captain | capitão | captain | Daily |
| kāpiri | කාපිරි | African (origin) | cafre | Kaffir | Daily |
| kārtuvē | කාර්තුවේ | quarter | quarto | quarter | Daily |
| kavalāru | කවලාරු | cavalier | cavaleiro | cavalier | Food |
| karadamuṁgu | කරදමුංගු | cardamom | cardamomo | cardamom | Food |
| karadāsi, kaḍadāsi | කරදාසි, කඩදාසි | paper | cartaz | card | Daily |
| karattaya | කරත්තය | carriage, cart | carreta | carriage | Daily |
| kasādaya | කසාදය | marriage | casada | married (feminine) | Daily |
| kāskuva | කාස්කුව | hull | casco | hull | Daily |
| katōlika | කතෝලික | Catholic | Católica | Catholic (feminine) | Religious |
| katiyā | කතියා | slave, captive | cativa | captive (feminine) | Daily |
| kayila | කයිල | peg | cavilha | peg | Daily |
| kendiya | කෙන්දිය | candle | candeia | lamp | Daily |
| kēju | කේජු | cheese | queijo | cheese | Food |
| kēntiya | කේන්තිය | anger | quente | hot | Daily |
| kīliya | කීලිය | keel | quilha | keel | Daily |
| kompāsuva | කොම්පාසුව | compass | compasso | compass | Daily |
| kondēsiya | කොන්දේසිය | condition | condição | condition | Daily |
| kōntaraya | කෝන්තරය | grudge | contra | against | Daily |
| koral | කොරල් | coral | coral | coral | Daily |
| korosma | කොරොස්ම | Lent | Quaresma | Lent | Religious |
| kusima | කුසිම | cushion | coxim | cushion | Daily |
| kosuva | කොසුව | trough | cocho | trough | Daily |
| kōvaya | කෝවය | pipe | cova | pipe | Daily |
| kuluna | කුලුන | column | coluna | column | Military |
| kūññaya | කූඤ්ඤය | wedge | cunha | wedge | Daily |
| kurusaya | කුරුසය | Cross | cruz | Cross | Religious |
| kussiya | කුස්සිය | kitchen | cozinha | kitchen | Daily |
| laskiriñña | ලස්කිරිඤ්ඤ | Lascarins | lascarim | Asian militiaman | Military |
| landēsi | ලන්දේසි | Dutch | holandês | Dutch (masculine) | Administration |
| lansaya | ලන්සය | lance | lança | lance | Military |
| lantǣruma | ලන්තෑරුම | lantern | lanterna | lantern | Daily |
| lāpila | ලාපිල | lapel | lapela | lapel | Clothing |
| lasariya | ලසරිය | flourish/ornamentation | laçaria | flourish | Daily |
| lēṇ̆ḍiyā, lēnḍiyā | ලේඬියා, ලේන්ඩියා | nit | lêndea | nit | Daily |
| lensōluva | ලෙන්සෝලුව | bedsheet | lençol | bedsheet | Daily |
| lēnsuva | ලේන්සුව | handkerchief | lenço | handkerchief | Clothing |
| liṁgusa | ලිංගුස | type of dried sausage | linguiça | sausage | Food |
| lisa | ලිස | list | liça | list | Daily |
| liyal | ලියල් | loyal | leal | loyal | Daily |
| lusa | ලුස | light | luz | light | Daily |
| lusiyā | ලුසියා | Lucy | Lúcia | Lucy | Proper Name |
| māntuva | මාන්තුව | cloak | manto | mantle | Clothing |
| mādiriññā | මාදිරිඤ්ඤා | godmother | madrinha | godmother | Daily |
| mamol | මමොල් | marble | mármore | marble | Daily |
| mantaya | මන්තය | blanket | manta | blanket | Fruit |
| mantēga | මන්තේග | butter | manteiga | butter | Daily |
| maññokkā | මඤ්ඤොක්කා | manioc | mandioca | manioc | Daily |
| mariyā | මරියා | Mary | Maria | Mary | Proper Name |
| masan | මසන් | apple | maçã | apple | Fruit |
| mēs | මේස් | socks | meias | socks | Daily |
| mēsaya | මේසය | table | mesa | table | Daily |
| mestri | මෙස්ත්‍රි | master of a trade | mestre | master | Daily |
| minindōru | මිනින්දෝරු | surveyor | medidor | measurer | Daily |
| mīsama | මීසම | mission | missão | mission | Daily |
| mōsuvā | මෝසුවා | servant | moço | a young man | Daily |
| mūnissama | මූනිස්සම | munition | munição | munition | Military |
| navāla | නවාල | clasp knife | navalha | clasp Knife | Daily |
| nābu | නාබු | turnip | nabo | turnip | Food |
| nattala | නත්තල | Christmas | Natal | Christmas | Religious |
| nōnā | නෝනා | Lady | dona | Lady | Daily |
| nōs | නෝස් | nutmeg | noz (noz-moscada) | nutmeg | Food |
| notīsiya | නොතීසිය | notice | notícia | notice | Administration |
| olam | ඔලම් | elm | olmo | elm | Botanical |
| oliva | ඔලිව | olive | oliva | olive | Food |
| ōlanda | ඕලන්ද | Holland | Holanda | Holland | Administration |
| orasan | ඔරසන් | prayers | orações | prayers | Religious |
| ostensōriya | ඔස්තෙන්සෝරිය | monstrance | ostensório | monstrance | daily |
| padāsa | පදාස | portion | pedaço | piece | Daily |
| panaderiyā | පනදෙරියා | baker | padeiro | baker | Daily |
| pādiliyā | පාදිලියා | Father | padre | Father (priest) | Daily |
| pādōla | පාදෝල | hand barrow | padiola | hand barrow | Daily |
| pagāva | පගාව | bribe | paga | pay/salary/wages | Administration |
| palmiṭa | පල්මිට | spatula | palmeta | spatula | Daily |
| pān | පාන් | bread | pão | bread | |
| parayisuva | පරයිසුව | paradise | paraíso | paradise | Daily |
| pāskuva | පාස්කුව | Easter | Páscoa | Easter | Religious |
| pāttayā | පාත්තයා | goose | pato | duck | Daily |
| pādiriññā | පාදිරිඤ්ඤා | godfather | padrinho | godfather | Daily |
| payinēruva | පයිනේරුවා | pioneer | pioneiro | pioneer (masculine) | Daily |
| pāp | පාප් | Pope | Papa | Pope | Religious |
| pastǣla | පස්තෑල | pie | pastel | pastry | Food |
| pavila | පවිල | pavilion | pavilhão | pavilion | Daily |
| pāvuḷu | පාවුළු | Paul | Paulo | Paul | Proper Name |
| pedarēruvā | පෙදරේරුවා | mason | pedreiro | mason | Daily |
| pēduru | පේදුරු | Peter | Pedro | Peter | Proper Name |
| penēraya | පෙනේරය | sieve | peneira | sieve | Daily |
| peragam | පෙරගම් | banns | proclamas | banns | Daily |
| perakadōruvā | පෙරකදෝරුවා | proctor | procurador | proctor | Daily |
| perakalāsiya | පෙරකලාසිය | warrant of attorney, proxy | procuração | proxy | Daily |
| perōla | පෙරෝල | pearl | pérola | pearl | Daily |
| pigura | පිගුර | figure | figura | figure | Daily |
| pikama | පිකම | pickaxe | picão | pickaxe | Military |
| pīkudu | පීකුදු | liver (of animals) | fígado | liver | Daily |
| pinu | පිනු | pine | pinho | pine | Botanical |
| pinsaya | පින්සය | tweezer | pinça | tweezer | Daily |
| pintāruva | පින්තාරුව | painting | pintura | painting, picture | Daily |
| pintūraya | පින්තූරය | picture | pintura | painting, picture | Daily |
| pinsala | පින්සල | paintbrush | pincel | brush | Daily |
| pīppaya | පීප්පය | cask/barrel | pipa | cask | Daily |
| pipiññā | පිපිඤ්ඤා | cucumber | pepino | cucumber | Food |
| pistōlaya | පිස්තෝලය | pistol | pistola | pistol | Army |
| pīrisiya | පීරිසිය | saucer | pires | saucer | Daily |
| pīttaya | පීත්තය | ribbon | fita | ribbon | Clothing |
| poloyiya | පොලොයියා | flounce | folho | flounce | Daily |
| pōraṇuva | පෝරණුව | oven, kiln | forno | oven | Daily |
| pōrtaya | පෝර්තය | porthole | porta | door | Daily |
| prāskuva | ප්‍රාස්කුව | flask | frasco | flask | Daily |
| puliya | පුලිය | pulley | polia | pulley | Daily |
| punīlaya | පුනීලය | funnel | funil | funnel | Daily |
| rābu | රාබු | radish | rábano | radish | Food |
| rayivaya | රයිවය | anger | raiva | anger | Daily |
| raṁcuva | රංචුව | herd, group | rancho | herd, ranch | Daily |
| rāttala | රාත්තල | pound (measurement) | arrátel | pound | Daily |
| rēndaya | රේන්දය | lace | renda | lace | Clothing |
| rōdaya | රෝදය | wheel | roda | wheel | Daily |
| rōmānu | රෝමානු | Roman | romano | Roman (masculine) | Daily |
| rōsa | රෝස | rose, pink | rosa | rose, pink | Daily |
| rūbiya | රූබිය | ruby | rubi | ruby | Daily |
| rulan | රුලන් | semolina | rolão | semolina | Food |
| rusu | රුසු | grey | ruço | grey | Daily |
| saban | සබන් | soap | sabão | soap | Daily |
| sakōla | සකෝල | satchel | sacola | satchel | Daily |
| sākkuva | සාක්කුව | pocket | saco | sack | Daily |
| salādaya | සලාදය | salad | salada | salad | Food |
| santiyāgu | සන්තියාගු | James | Santiago | James | Proper Name |
| sāntu | සාන්තු | holy, saint | santo | saint (masculine) | Daily |
| sāntuvāriya | සාන්තුවාරිය | sanctuary | santuário | sanctuary | Daily |
| sapatēruvā | සපතේරුවා | shoemaker | sapateiro | shoemaker | Food |
| sapattuva | සපත්තුව | shoe | sapato | shoe | Clothing |
| sarampa | සරම්ප | measles | sarampo | measles | Daily |
| saruvāla | සරුවාල | pyjama | ceroulas | pants | Daily |
| sātan | සාතන් | Satan | Satã | Satan | Daily |
| setim | සෙතිම් | satin | cetim | satin | Clothing |
| sāvāla | සාවාල | menhaden, pogy, shad | savelha, sável | shad | Daily |
| savudiya | සවුදිය | a toast | saúde | health | Daily |
| sāya | සාය | skirt | saia | skirt | Clothing |
| sēda | සේද | silk | seda | silk | Clothing |
| sēnil | සේනිල් | senile | senil | senile | Daily |
| sēriyā | සේරියා | mermaid | sereia | mermaid | Daily |
| sidādiya | සිදාදිය | city | cidade | city | Administration |
| silima | සිලිම | Shilling | xelim | shilling | Daily |
| simenti | සිමෙන්ති | cement | cimento | cement | Daily |
| sināla | සිනාල | signal | sinal | sinal | Daily |
| sinsēruva | සින්සේරුව | ashtray | cinzeiro | ashtray | Daily |
| sintuva | සින්තුව | belt | cinto | belt | Daily |
| sīnuva | සීනුව | bell | sino | bell | Daily |
| siññō | සිඤ්ඤෝ | Sir | senhor | sir | Daily |
| sitāsi | සිතාසි | summons | citação | monition | Administration |
| sokolat | සොකොලත් | chocolate | chocolate | chocolate | Food |
| soldāduvā | සොල්දාදුවා | soldier | soldado | soldier | Military |
| stōlaya | ස්තෝලය | stole | estola | stole | Daily |
| sumānaya | සුමානය | week | semana | week | Daily |
| sumāsu | සුමාසු | padding | chumaço | wadding | Military |
| sūkiri | සූකිරි | sugar | açúcar | sugar | Food |
| tācciya | තාච්චිය | frying pan | tacho | pan | Daily |
| tambōruva | තම්බෝරුව | tambourine | tambor | drum | Daily |
| tæbǣruma | තැබෑරුම | tavern | taberna | tavern | Daily |
| tampuva | තම්පුව | envelope | tampo | cover | Daily |
| tapa | තප | slap | tapa | slap | Daily |
| tapēsiya | තපේසිය | carpet | tapete | carpet | Daily |
| tasa | තස | cup | taça | cup | Daily |
| tāppaya | තාප්පය | parapet wall | taipa | parapet wall | Daily |
| testamēntuva | තෙස්තමේන්තුව | testament | testamento | testament | Daily |
| tōntuva | තෝන්තුව | dizziness | tonto | dizzy (masculine) | Daily |
| toppiya | තොප්පිය | hat | topo | cap | Clothing |
| tīnta | තීන්ත | Ink, paint | tinta | ink, paint | Daily |
| tirin̆gu | තිරිඟු | wheat | trigo | wheat | Food |
| tīruva | තීරුව | customs, duty | tiro | customs | Administration |
| tōmbuva | තෝම්බුව | register | tombo | register | Administration |
| tuvāya | තුවාය | towel | toalha | towel | Daily |
| ventu | වෙන්තු | windy | vento | wind | Daily |
| vestiya | වෙස්තිය | waistcoat | véstia | waistcoat | Daily |
| vindima | වින්දිම | vintage | vindima | vintage | Daily |
| villuda | විල්ලුද | velvet | veludo | velvet | Daily |
| vinākiri | විනාකිරි | vinegar | vinagre | vinegar | Food |
| vīduruva | වීදුරුව | glass | vidro | glass | Daily |
| viskōtuva | විස්කෝතුව | biscuit | biscoito | biscuit, cookie | Food |
| visita | විසිත | visit | visita | visit | Daily |
| vīvā, viyavā | වීවා, වියවා | widow | viúva | widow | Daily |
| viyōla | වියෝල | guitar | viola, violão | guitar | Music |

== Proper Names ==
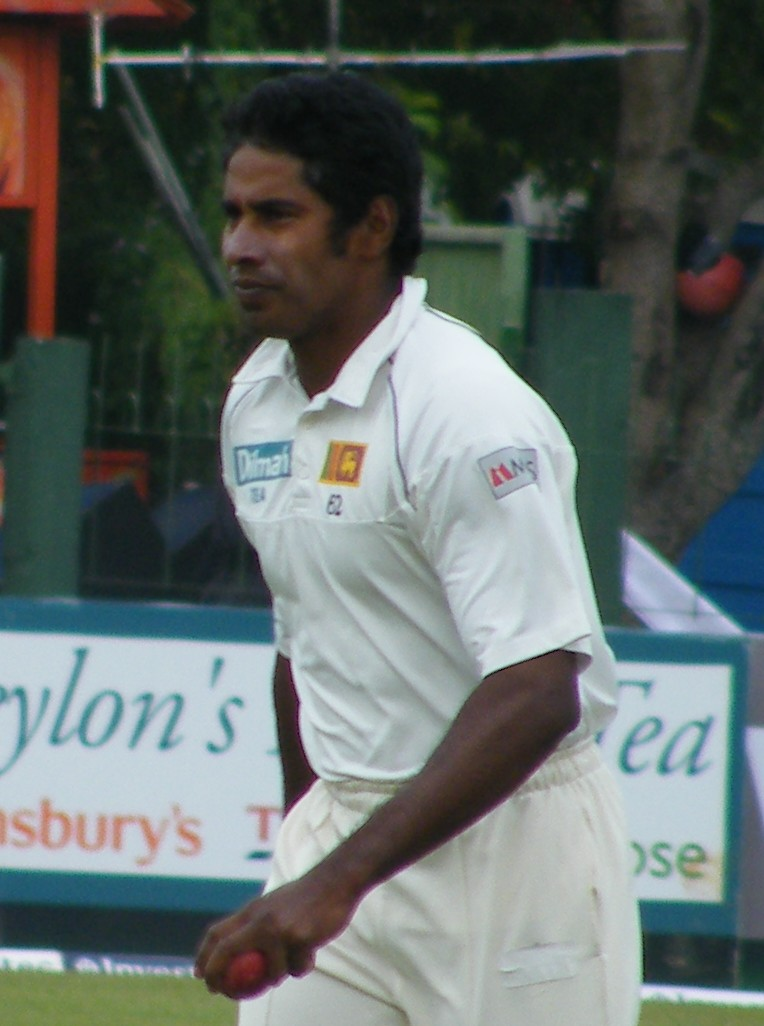
Former Sri Lankan cricketer Chaminda Vaas is one of many Sinhalese with a surname of Portuguese origin.

Many Sinhalese adopted Portuguese names, especially surnames. Some are very common (e.g. Perera, De Silva). The names, however, do not necessarily denote Portuguese ancestry or Christian religious affiliation, with many Buddhist Sinhalese having Portuguese-origin surnames, as Buddhism does not recognise the notion of heresy for not naming their children with names which do not originate from the Pali language

| Sri Lankan Form | සිංහල | Portuguese |
|---|---|---|
| Aponso | අපොන්සු | Afonso |
| Cabral | කබ්‍රාල් | Cabral |
| Caldera, Kaldera | කල්දේරා | Caldeira |
| Corea | කෝරියා | Correia |
| Croos | ක්රූස් | Cruz |
| De Abrew | ද අබ්‍රෙව් | Abreu |
| De Almeda, Almeda | ද අල්මේදා, අල්මේදා | De Almeida |
| De Alwis | ද අල්විස් | Alves |
| De Costa | ද කොස්තා | Da Costa |
| De Livera, Livera | ද ලිවේරා, ලිවේරා | De Oliveira |
| De Mel | ද මෙල් | Melo |
| De Sampayo, Sampayo | ද සම්පයෝ, සම්පයෝ | Sampaio |
| De Saram | ද සේරම් | Serra |
| De Silva, Silva | ද සිල්වා, සිල්වා | Da Silva |
| Dias | දියස්, දියෙස් | Dias |
| Fonseka | ෆොන්සේකා | Fonseca |
| Fernando | ප්‍රනාන්දු | Fernandes |
| Gomes, Gomis | ගෝමෙස්, ගෝමිස් | Gomes |
| Gonsalkorale | ගොන්සල් කෝරලේ | Gonçalves |
| Grero | ග්‍රේරු | Guerreiro |
| Mendis | මෙන්දිස් | Mendes |
| Nonis | නෝනිස් | Nunes |
| Pasqual, Pasquel | පැස්කුවල් | Pascoal |
| Perera | පෙරේරා | Pereira |
| Peiris | පීරිස් | Peres |
| Pinto | පින්ටෝ | Pinto |
| Rodrigo | රොද්‍රිගෝ | Rodrigues |
| Rosa | රෝසා | Rosa |
| Salgado | සල්ගාදු | Salgado |
| Sigera | සිගේරා | Siqueira |
| Suwaris | සුවාරිස් | Soares |
| Tisera, Tissera | තිසේරා | Teixeira |
| Vaas | වාස් | Vaz |
| Vadumestri, Vadumestrige | වඩුමෙස්ට්‍රි, වඩුමෙස්ට්‍රිගේ | Combination of Sinhala Vadu meaning carpenter, Português mestre meaning "master of a trade" and Sinhala ge meaning "house of" |

== See also ==
- Dutch loanwords in Sinhala
- English loanwords in Sinhala
- Tamil loanwords in Sinhala
