= Salgado (name) =

Salgado is a Galician and Portuguese surname.

== Etymology ==
The surname Salgado, in Galician and Portuguese, is a nickname for a witty person, coming from salgado 'salty', figuratively 'witty', 'piquant' (from Late Latin salicatus, past participle of salicare 'to give salt to').

People with the surname include:

== Musicians ==
- Curtis Salgado (born 1954), an American musician
- Gugut Salgado, member of Moonpools & Caterpillars
- Luis Humberto Salgado Torres, an Ecuadorian musician
- Michael Salgado, a Tejano musician

== Politicians ==
=== Brazil ===
- Clóvis Salgado da Gama, governor of Minas Gerais
- Plínio Salgado (1895–1975), founder of Brazilian Integralism

=== Chile ===
- René Tapia Salgado (1914–2006), Chilean politician

=== Honduras ===
- Juan Ramón Salgado (1961–2006), member of the Liberal Party

=== Mexico ===
- Alvárez Salgado Roberto, member of the LVI Legislature
- Juan Salgado Brito (1948–2025), politician
- Salgado Delgado Fernando, member of the LVI Legislature
- Zeferino Salgado (born 1971), Mexican politician

=== Peru ===
- Luz Salgado

=== Portugal ===
- Salgado Zenha, founding member of the Socialist Party

=== Spain ===
- Elena Salgado (born 1949)
- Fernando Arias-Salgado, television personality and diplomat
- Gabriel Arias-Salgado (1904–1962)
- Rafael Arias-Salgado, member of the People's Party

== Sports personalities ==
- Belarmino Salgado (born 1966), a Cuban judoka
- Carolina Solberg Salgado (born 1987), a Brazilian beach volleyball player
- Dilhara Salgado (born 1983), Sri Lankan Sinhala archer
- Eloy Salgado, footballer for the Houston Force
- Gabriela Salgado (born 1998), a South African soccer player
- Javier Alvarez Salgado, a Spanish athlete
- Jorge Sánchez Salgado (born 1985), a Cuban volleyball player
- José Luis Salgado (born 1966), a Mexican footballer
- Mario Salgado (born 1981), a Chilean footballer
- Michel Salgado (born 1975), a Spanish footballer
- Omar Salgado (born 1993), an American soccer player
- Rafael Salgado Torres, president of Deportivo de La Coruña (1952–1953)

== Other ==
- Aaron J. Salgado, film director of Jamaica Motel
- Andrés Salgado Tous, colombian screenwriter
- Carlos Salgado (1940–2007), Honduran radio journalist and comedian
- Carolina Salgado, former partner of Jorge Nuno Pinto da Costa
- James Salgado (fl. 1680), Spanish refugee and pamphleteer
- José Salgado, founder of Lobos, Argentina
- Juliano Ribeiro Salgado (born 1974), Brazilian filmmaker, director, and writer
- Lélia Wanick Salgado (born 1947), Brazilian author, film producer and environmentalist
- Leonardo Salgado, Argentine paleontologist
- M. P. Salgado, 40th Surveyor General of Sri Lanka
- Minoli Salgado, Malaysian-born British writer and academic
- Ranji Salgado (1929–2009), Sri Lankan Sinhala economist and civil servant
- Ricardo Salgado, Portuguese economist and banker
- Rob Salgado, Golden Knights chess champion: 1975, 1983
- Sebastião Salgado (1944–2025), Brazilian social documentary photographer and photojournalist
- Silvia Salgado (model), Mexican model

== Extended names ==
- Diego Salgado Costa de Menezes (Diego Salgado da Costa Menezes), a Brazilian footballer
- Estéfano (Fabio Alonso Salgado), a Colombian musician
- Francisco Franco (Francisco Paulino Hermenegildo Teódulo Franco y Bahamonde, Salgado y Pardo de Andrade), Spanish head of state
- José Lind (José Lind Salgado), a Puerto Rican baseball player
- Maria do Carmo Roma Machado Cardoso Salgado (born 1914), a member of the Portuguese nobility; great-grandmother of Maria Roma
- Ramón Franco (Ramón Franco y Bahamonde, Salgado y Pardo de Andrade), a Spanish aviator and political activist
- Ruth Zavaleta (Ruth Zavaleta Salgado), a Mexican politician

== Fictional people ==
- Ligia Salgado (Teresa Seiblitz) (born 1964), Brazilian version of Desperate Housewives

=== Esperanza ===
- Isabel Illutre de Salgado (Charo Santos-Concio) (born 1955)
- Juan Salgado (Dante Rivero)
- Raphael Salgado (Marvin Agustin) (born 1979)
- Regina Salgado (Angelika de la Cruz) (born 1981)
- Rosella Salgado (Carmina Villarroel) (born 1975)
- Socorro Salgado (Judy Ann Santos) (born 1978)

== See also ==
- Salgado (disambiguation)
