= Ranji (disambiguation) =

Ranji or K. S. Ranjitsinhji (1872–1933) was a cricketer of the Victorian and Edwardian period.

Ranji may also refer to:

- Ranji Trophy, a domestic first-class cricket championship in India
- Ranji Bush or Acacia pyrifolia, a plant endemic to Australia

== People with the given name ==
- Ranji Hordern (1883–1938), Australian cricketer
- Ranji Wilson (1886–1953), New Zealand rugby footballer
- Ranji Salgado (1929–2009), Sri Lankan economist, former Assistant Director of the International Monetary Fund
