= Languages of Sri Lanka =

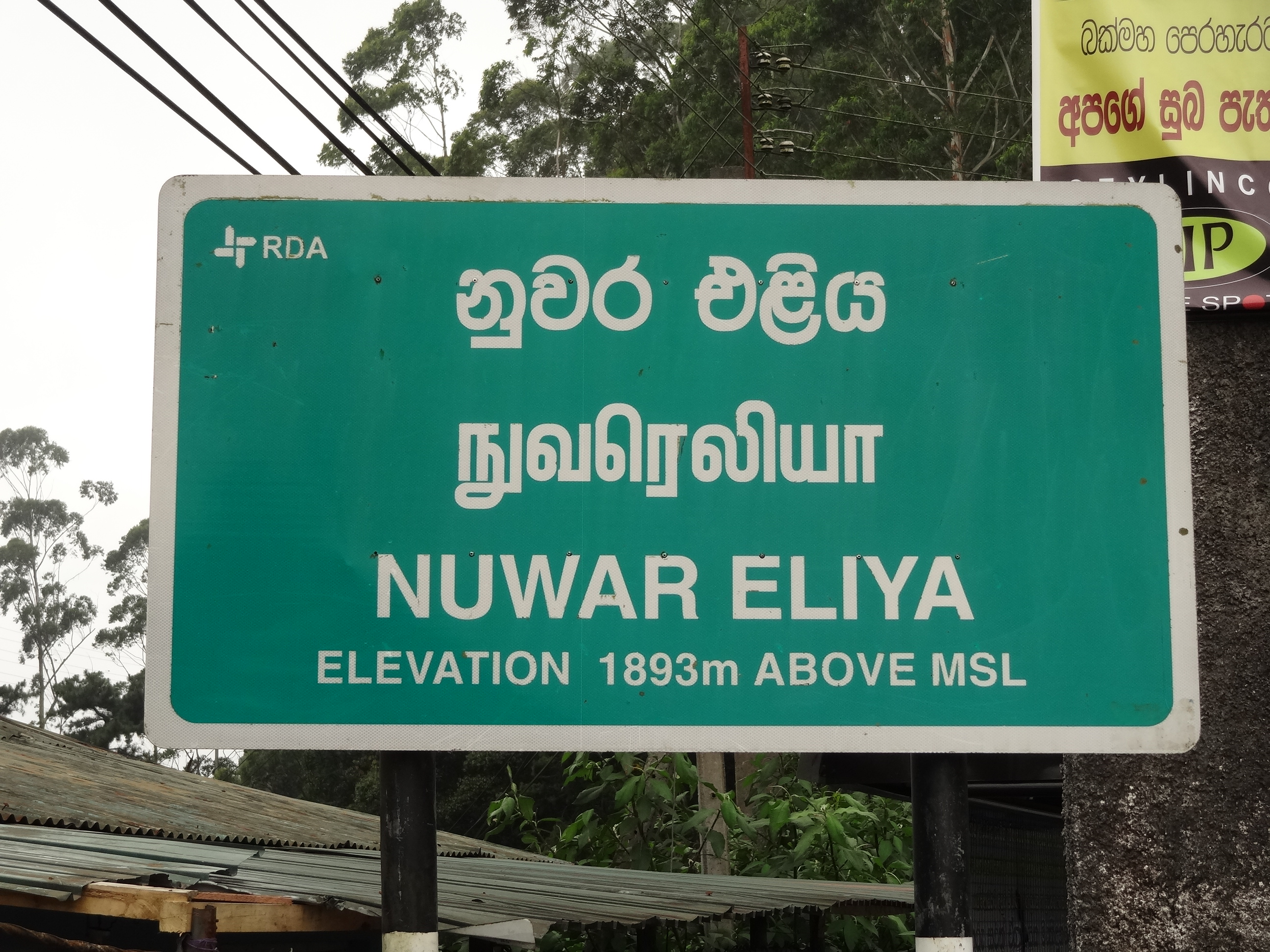
- A sign in Sinhala, Tamil and English
- Official: Sinhala and Tamil
- Semi-official: English
- Vernacular: Sri Lankan Tamil dialects, Sri Lankan English, Sri Lanka Malay
- Minority: Sri Lankan Portuguese creole, Vedda, Arwi
- Foreign: English
- Signed: Sri Lankan sign languages
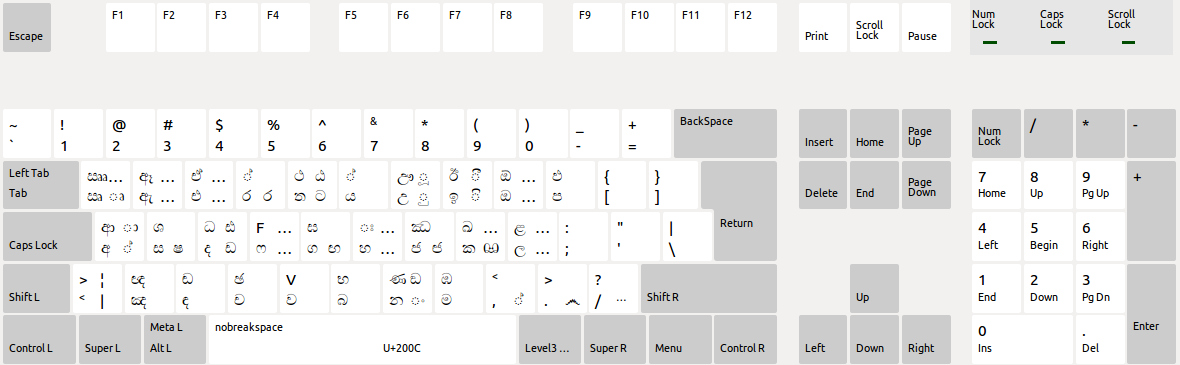
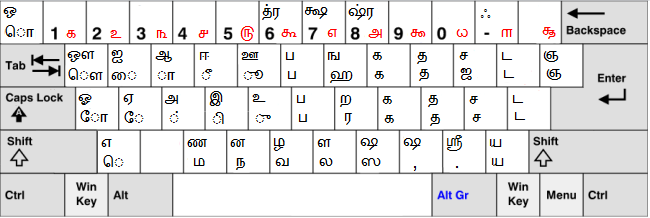
- Keyboard layout: QWERTY, Sinhala keyboard, Tamil 99

The main languages spoken in Sri Lanka are Sinhala and Tamil. Several languages are spoken in Sri Lanka within the Indo-Aryan, Dravidian, and Austronesian families. Sri Lanka accords official status to Sinhala and Tamil, with English as a recognised language. The languages spoken on the island nation are deeply influenced by the various languages in India, Europe and Southeast Asia. Arab settlers and the colonial powers of Portugal, the Netherlands and Britain have also influenced the development of modern languages in Sri Lanka. See below for the most-spoken languages of Sri Lanka.

Languages in Percentage. View chart definition.

== Native and indigenous languages ==
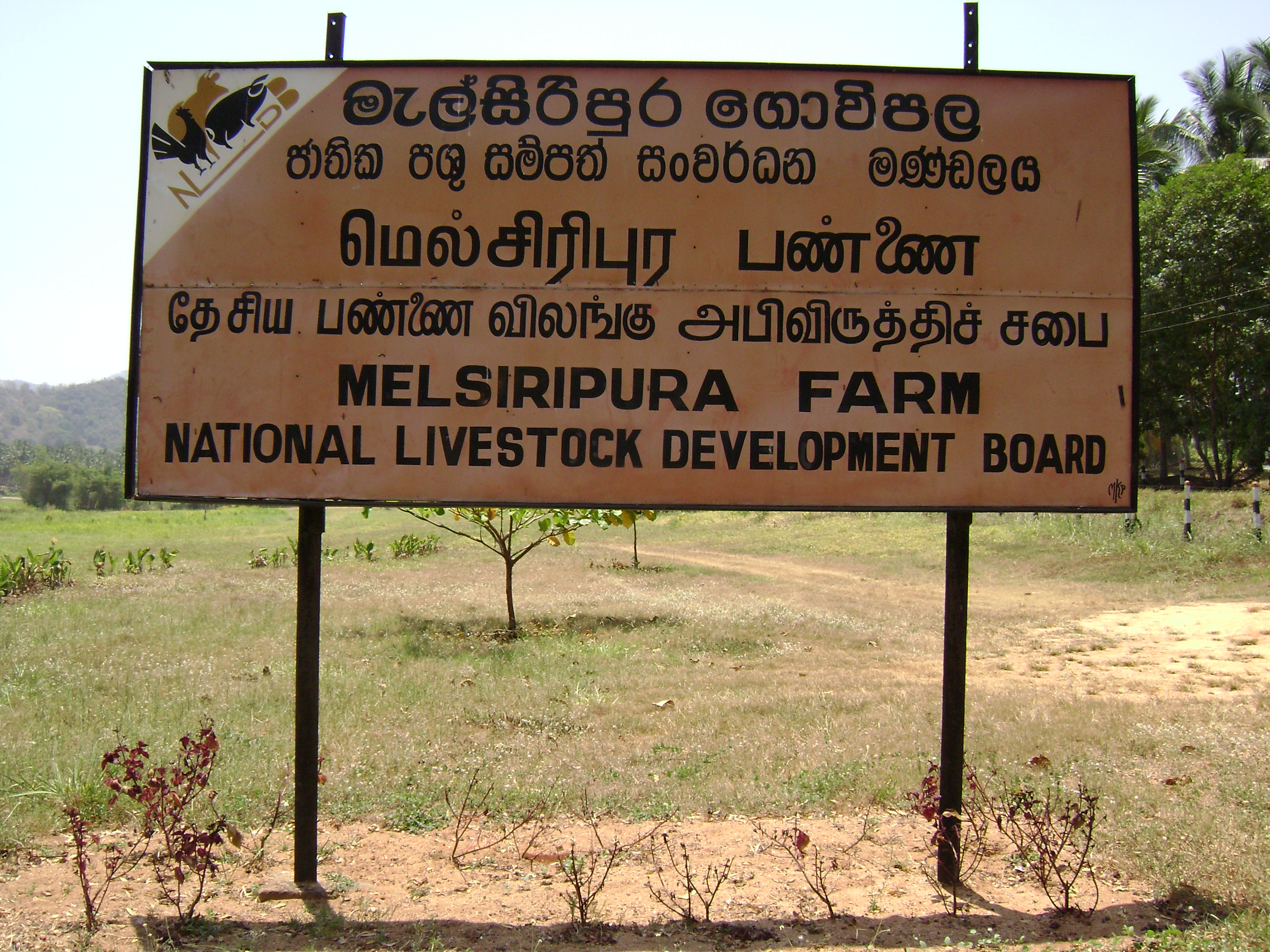
Trilingual sign in Sri Lanka

As per 2016, the Sinhala language is mostly spoken by the Sinhalese people, who constitute approximately 74.9% of the national population and total about 16.6 million. However, around 92% of the population are able to speak Sinhalese. It uses the Sinhala abugida script, which is derived from the ancient Brahmi script. About 300 of the Veddah people, totaling barely 2,500 in 2002, speak the Veddah language, of which the origin is debated. The Tamil language is spoken by native Sri Lankan Tamils and is also spoken by Indian Tamils of Sri Lanka and by most Sri Lankan Moors. Tamil speakers number around 3.8 million (19% of the population), making it the second largest language in Sri Lanka. The Telugu language is spoken by the Sri Lankan Telugus who number between 40,000 to 125,000. There are more than 40,000 speakers of the Sri Lankan Malay language.

== Languages of foreign origin ==
English, Sinhala and Tamil languages on a war grave memorial plate in Kandy. (click to see full view of memorial plate)

English in Sri Lanka is fluently spoken by approximately 23.8% of the population, and widely used for official and commercial purposes. It is the native language of approximately 74,000 people, mainly in urban areas. A handful of the 3,400 people of Portuguese descent speak Sri Lankan Portuguese creole.
