= Karaja =

Karaja or Karajá may refer to:

- Karajá, an indigenous tribe of Brazil
  - Karajá language
- Karaja (singer) (born 1978), German musician
- Karaja, Iran, a village in East Azerbaijan Province, Iran

== See also ==
- Karaya (disambiguation)
