= Karaya =

Karaya may refer to:

== Places ==
- Karaya, Park Circus, Kolkata, West Bengal, India
- Karaya, Dakshina Kannada, Karnataka, India; see Template:Settlements in Dakshina Kannada district
- Karaya, Kano, Nigeria; see List of villages in Kano State

== People ==
- Erich Hartmann (callsign: Karaya 1), a German WWII fighter pilot and all time top scoring fighter ace
- Vadym Voroshylov (callsign: Karaya), Ukrainian fighter pilot and HESA Shahed 136 shootdown ace

== Linguistics ==
- Karayá language of Brazil
- Karay-a language of the Philippines
- kārəyā (කාරයා), a Sinhala slang term also used in Sinhalese English

== Other uses ==
- Karaya Quartet, a German WWII fighter group
- Gum karaya, a vegetable gum
- Karaya, a clothing label established by the K-Pop girl group Kara (South Korean group)

== See also ==
- Karaja (disambiguation)
