= List of Sinhala words of English origin =

Sinhala words of English origin mainly came about during the period of British colonial rule in Sri Lanka. This period saw absorption of several English words into the local language brought about by the interaction between the English and Sinhala languages.

These are examples of Sinhala words of English origin

Word	Sinhala	Meaning	Original form
admirāl	අද්මිරාල්	Admiral	Admiral
akkaraya	අක්කරය	Acre	Acre
ælbamaya	ඇල්බමය	Album	Album
ælbēniyāva	ඇල්බේනියාව	Albania	Albania
æljīriyāva	ඇල්ජීරියාව	Algeria	Algeria
æmplifayar	ඇම්ප්ලිෆයර්	Amplifier	Amplifier
ænṭākṭik	ඇන්ටාක්ටික්	Antarctica	Antarctica
ārmēniyāva	ආර්මේනියාව	Armenia	Armenia
atōrni	අතෝර්නි	Attorney	Attorney
administrāsi-kara	අද්මිනිස්ත්‍රාසි කර	Administrator	Administrator
ayarlantaya	අයර්ලන්තය	Ireland	Ireland
ayis	අයිස්	Ice	Ice
ayislantaya	අයිස්ලන්තය	Iceland	Iceland
ararup, ararut	අරරුප්, අරරුත්	Arrowroot	Arrowroot
avunsaya	අවුන්සය	Ounce	Ounce
bækṭīriyā	බැක්ටීරියා	Bacteria	Bacteria
bagāsi	බගාසි	Baggage	Baggage
bas	බස්	Bus	Bus
baṭar	බටර්	Butter	Butter
bayibalaya	බයිබලය	Bible	Bible
belarus	බෙලරුස්	Belarus	Belarus
beljiyama	බෙල්ජියම	Belgium	Belgium
bēsama	බේසම	Basin	Basin
bhūtānaya	භූතානය	Bhutan	Bhutan
bila	බිල	Bill	Bill
bilantu	බිලන්තු	Brilliant	Brilliant
birōva	බිරෝව	Bureau	Bureau
blækmēl	බ්ලැක්මේල්	Blackmail	Blackmail
bōlaya	බෝලය	Ball	Ball
bōmbaya	බෝම්බය	Bomb	Bomb
bōṭṭuva	බෝට්ටුව	Boat	Boat
brigēḍiyar	බ්‍රිගේඩියර්	Brigadier	Brigadier
bukiya	බුකිය	Bookmaker	Bookie
busala	බුසල	Bushel	Bushel
cājar	චාජර්	Charger	Charger
cæk	චැක්	Cheque	Cheque
cīna	චීන	Chinese	Chinese
cīs	චීස්	Cheese	Cheese
ḍabal ḍekar bas	ඩබල් ඩෙකර් බස්	Double decker bus	Double decker bus
ḍenmārkaya	ඩෙන්මාර්කය	Denmark	Denmark
depārtamēntuva	දෙපාර්තමේන්තුව	Department	Department
ḍeṭanēṭaraya	ඩෙටනේටරය	Detonator	Detonator
distrikkaya	දිස්ත්‍රික්කය	District	District
dīsiya	දීසිය	Dish	Dish
ḍiṭarjanṭ	ඩිටර්ජන්ට්	Detergent	Detergent
dostara	දොස්තර	Doctor	Doctor
dusima	දුසිම	Dozen	Dozen
ænjima	ඇන්ජිම	Engine	Engine
estōniyā	එස්තෝනියා	Estonia	Estonia
eyār cīf mārṣal marshal	එයාර් චීෆ් මාර්ෂල්	Air Chief Marshal	Air Chief Marshal
eyār vayis mārṣal	එයාර් වයිස් මාර්ෂල්	Air Vice Marshal	Air Vice Marshal
fīlḍ mārṣal	ෆීල්ඩ් මාර්ෂල්	Field Marshal	Field Marshal
finlantaya	ෆින්ලන්තය	Finland	Finland
flōṭila	ෆ්ලෝටිලා	Flotilla	Flotilla
fōlḍara	ෆෝල්ඩර	Folder	Folder
fonṭa	ෆොන්ට	Font	Font
gavma	ගව්ම	Gown, Dress	Gown
gǣs	ගෑස්	Gas	Gas
garāj	ගරාජ්	Garage	Garage
gēṭṭuva	ගේට්ටුව	Gate	Gate
golōva	ගොලෝව	Globe	Globe
goværnamentuva	ගොවැර්නමෙන්තුව	Government	Government
gornamentuva	ගොර්නමෙන්තුව	Government	Government
gramanfōn	ග්‍රමන්ෆෝන්	Gramophone	Gramophone
grīnlantaya	ග්‍රීන්ලන්තය	Greenland	Greenland
grīsiya	ග්‍රීසිය	Greece	Greece
heḍfōns	හෙඩ්ෆෝන්ස්	Headphones	Headphones
helikopṭar	හෙලිකොප්ටර්	Helicopter	Helicopter
hōṭal	හෝටල්	Hotel	Hotel
ījiptuva	ඊජිප්තුව	Egypt	Egypt
ilekṭronika	ඉලෙක්ට්‍රොනික	Electronic	Electronic
indiyāva	ඉන්දියාව	India	India
injinēru	ඉන්ජිනේරු	Engineer	Engineer
iṁgrīsi	ඉංග්‍රීසි	English	English
itāli	ඉතාලි	Italian	Italian
itāliya	ඉතාලිය	Italy	Italy
jænḍi	ජැන්ඩි	Dandy	Dandy
japan	ජපන්	Japan	Japan
jarmaniya	ජර්මනිය	Germany	Germany
jenarāl	ජෙනරාල්	General	General
joli	ජොලි	Fun	Jolly
jōrjiyā	ජෝර්ජියා	Georgia	Georgia
jubiliya	ජුබිලිය	Jubilee	Jubilee
jūriya	ජූරිය	Jury	Jury
kābanēṭ	කාබනේට්	Carbonate	Carbonate
kæbinaṭ	කැබිනට්	Cabinet (government)	Cabinet (government)
kælsiyam	කැල්සියම්	Calcium	Calcium
kæsaṭ	කැසට්	Cassette	Cassette
kæsok	කැසොක්	Cassock	Cassock
kānival	කානිවල්	Carnival	Carnival
kavicciya	කවිච්චිය	Couch	Couch
karnal	කර්නල්	Colonel	Colonel
kaskuruppuva	කස්කුරුප්පුව	Corkscrew	Corkscrew
kētalaya	කේතලය	Kettle	Kettle
kilōmīṭarayak	කිලෝමීටරයක්	Kilometer	Kilometer
komentuva	කොමෙන්තුව	Comment	Comment
komisama	කොමිසම	Commission	Commission
kompāsuva	කොම්පාසුව	Compass	Compass
kompæniya	කොම්පැනිය	Company	Company
kopiya	කොපිය	Copy	Copy
kōpral	කෝප්‍රල්	Corporal	Corporal
kōcciya	කෝච්චිය	Train	Coach
koriyāva	කොරියාව	Korea	Korea
korōnā vayiras	කොරෝනා වයිරස්	Coronavirus	Coronavirus
kostāpal	කොස්තාපල්	Constable	Constable
kroēśiyāva	ක්‍රොඒශියාව	Croatia	Croatia
læpṭop	ලැප්ටොප්	Laptop	Laptop
læṭarayiṭ	ලැටරයිට්	Laterite	Laterite
lagāsi	ලගාසි	Luggage	Luggage
lāns kōpral	ලාන්ස් කෝප්‍රල්	Lance Corporal	Lance Corporal
lavuma	ලවුම	Loudness	Loud
layisan	ලයිසන්	License	License
læyistuva	ලැයිස්තුව	List	List
lebananayē	ලෙබනනයේ	Lebanon	Lebanon
lisban	ලිස්බන්	Lisbon	Lisbon
listuva	ලිස්තුව	List	List
lituvēniyāva	ලිතුවේනියාව	Lithuania	Lithuania
loriya	ලොරිය	Lorry	Lorry
lutinan	ලුතිනන්	Lieutenant	Lieutenant
mæṣima	මැෂිම	Machine	Machine
mayikrafōnaya	මයික්‍රෆෝනය	Microphone	Microphone
misayila	මිසයිල	Missile	Missile
mongōliyāva	මොන්ගෝලියාව	Mongolia	Mongolia
monṭinigrō	මොන්ටිනිග්‍රෝ	Montenegro	Montenegro
morokkō	මොරොක්කෝ	Morocco	Morocco
moskav	මොස්කව්	Moscow	Moscow
nedarlantaya	නෙදර්ලන්තය	Netherlands	Netherlands
nepcūn	නෙප්චූන්	Neptune	Neptune
nōrvē	නෝර්වේ	Norway	Norway
nōṭṭuva	නෝට්ටුව	Note	Note
operā	ඔපෙරා	Opera	Opera
osṭriyāva	ඔස්ට්‍රියාව	Austria	Austria
pænsaya	පැන්සය	Penny	Penny
pārlimēntuva	පාර්ලිමේන්තුව	Parliament	Parliament
pavma	පව්ම	Pound	Pound
pænsala	පැන්සල	Pencil	Pencil
pǣna	පෑන	Pen	Pen
pænal	පැනල්	Flannel	Flannel
pærasiṭamōl	පැරසිටමෝල්	Paracetamol	Paracetamol
penisilin	පෙනිසිලින්	Penicillin	Penicillin
petsama	පෙත්සම	Petition	Petition
plāsṭik	ප්ලාස්ටික්	Plastic	Plastic
plūṭō	ප්ලූටෝ	Pluto	Pluto
pōlantaya	පෝලන්තය	Poland	Poland
pōniyā	පෝනියා	Pony	Pony
puḍima	පුඩිම	Pudding	Pudding
rayifal	රයිෆල්	Rifle	Rifle
ravuma	රවුම	Round	Round
regulāsiya	රෙගුලාසිය	Regulation	Regulation
rokaṭ	රොකට්	Rocket	Rocket
romænṭik	රොමැන්ටික්	Romantic	Romantic
sāspāna	සාස්පාන	Saucepan	Saucepan
silima	සිලිම	Schilling	Schilling
siriyāva	සිරියාව	Syria	Syria
sivil	සිවිල්	Civil	Civil
sivilima	සිවිලිම	Ceiling	Ceiling
skoṭlantayē	ස්කොට්ලන්තයේ	Scotland	Scotland
sopāva	සොපාව	Sofa	Sofa
soprānō	සොප්‍රානෝ	Soprano	
supar nōvāva	සුපර් නෝවාව	Supernova	Supernova
svāsilantaya	ස්වාසිලන්තය	Swaziland	Swaziland
svīḍanaya	ස්වීඩනය	Sweden	Sweden
sviṭsarlantaya	ස්විට්සර්ලන්තය	Switzerland	Switzerland
ṭæblaṭ	ටැබ්ලට්	Tablet	Tablet
ṭæksi	ටැක්සි	Taxi	Taxi
ṭæṁkiyak	ටැංකියක්	Tank	Tank
tāyilantaya	තායිලන්තය	Thailand	Thailand
talentaya	තලෙන්තය	Talent	Talent
tambalēruva	තම්බලේරුව	Tumbler	Tumbler
tiyūṣan	ටියුෂන්	Tuition	Tuition
ṭrǣm	ට්‍රෑම්	tram	tram
trisuriya	ත්‍රිසුරිය	Treasury	Treasury
tresuriya	ත්‍රෙසුරිය ‍	Treasury	Treasury
vayirasa	වයිරස	Virus	Virus
varentuva	වරෙන්තුව	Warrant	Warrant
vīḍiyō	වීඩියෝ	Video	Video
vikār	විකාර්	Vicar	Vicar
viyānā	වියානා	Vienna	Vienna
vokāsiya	වොකාසිය	Vocation	Vocation
vōlṭ	වෝල්ට්	Volt	Volt
veb bravusaraya	වෙබ් බ්‍රවුසරය	Web browser	Web browser
vēls	වේල්ස්	Wales	Wales
yāraya	යාරය	Yard (measurement)	Yard
yukrēnaya	යුක්‍රේනය	Ukraine	Ukraine
yurēnas	යුරේනස්	Uranus	Uranus
yurōpiya	යුරෝපිය	Europe	Europe
yurōpi	යුරෝපි	European	European

== See also ==
- Sinhala language
- Dutch loanwords in Sinhala
- Portuguese loanwords in Sinhala
- Tamil loanwords in Sinhala
