= List of Sinhala words of Tamil origin =

Sinhala words of Tamil origin came about as part of the more than 2000 years of language interactions between Sinhala and Tamil in the island of Sri Lanka, as well as through Dravidian substratum effect on the Sinhala language. According to linguists, there are about 900 Tamil words in Sinhala usage.

Sinhala is classified as an Indo-Aryan language and Tamil is classified as a Dravidian language. Separated from its sister Indo-Aryan languages such as Hindi and Bengali by a large belt of Dravidian languages, Sinhala along with Dhivehi of the Maldives evolved somewhat separately.

Close interaction with the Tamil language and the assimilation of Tamils into Sinhalese society contributed to the adoption of several Tamil origin words into the Sinhalese language. The range of borrowings goes beyond the scope to be expected for a situation where two neighbouring peoples exchange material goods: Firstly, there are many Tamil loanwords pertaining to everyday and social life (kinship terms, body parts, ordinary activities). Secondly, several lexical words (nouns, adjectives and verbs) along with interjections (ayiyō), (aḍō) have also been borrowed. This - along with the impact Tamil has had on Sinhala syntax (e.g. the use of a verbal adjective of "to say" as a subordinating conjunction meaning "whether" and "that") - is suggestive of not only close coexistence but the existence of large numbers of bilinguals and a high degree of mixing and intermarriage.

== Kinds of loanwords ==
Borrowings

The words pertaining to the fields of commerce, administration, botany, food and military are the most numerous; this is to be expected because

- new innovations and goods usually reached the Sinhalese via the Tamils whose area of settlement separates them from the rest of South Asia and
- Tamil speaking traders conducted most of the island's foreign trade since the 10th century AD. This is attested by multiple Tamil inscriptions in Sri Lanka left by medieval trade guilds.

== The borrowing process ==
Tamil loanwords in Sinhala can appear in the same form as the original word (e.g. akkā), but this is quite rare. Usually, a word has undergone some kind of modification to fit into the Sinhala phonological (e.g. paḻi becomes paḷi(ya) because the sound of /ḻ/, [ɻ], does not exist in the Sinhala phoneme inventory) or morphological system (e.g. ilakkam becomes ilakkama because Sinhala inanimate nouns (see grammatical gender) need to end with /a/, [ə], in order to be declineable).

These are the main ways Tamil words are incorporated into the Sinhala lexicon with different endings:

- With an /a/ added to Tamil words ending in /m/ and other consonants (e.g. pālam > pālama).
- With a /ya/ or /va/ added to words ending in vowels (e.g. araḷi > araliya).
- With the Tamil ending /ai/ represented as /ē/, commonly spelt /aya/.
- With the animate ending /yā/ added to Tamil words signifying living beings or /yā/ replacing the Tamil endings /aṉ/, /ar/, etc. (e.g. caṇṭiyar > caṇḍiyā).

It can be observed that the Tamil phonemes /ḷ/ and /ḻ/ do not coherently appear as /ḷ/ in Sinhala but sometimes as /l/ as well. This is because in Sinhala pronunciation there is no distinction between /ḷ/ and /l/; the letter /ḷ/ is merely maintained as an etymological spelling.

== Time of borrowing ==
In many cases, the appearance of a loanword in a language indicates whether the borrowing is old or more recent: The more a word deviates from the "original" one, the longer it must have been a part of the respective lexicon, because while being used, a word can undergo changes (sometimes regular sound changes along with the native words). The inversion of this argument is not possible since loanwords already matching the linguistic requirements of the target language may remain unchanged. Thus, the word täpäl (Tamil tapāl) gives away its old age because the respective umlaut processes took place before the 8th century; iḍama (Tamil iṭam) however needn't be a recent borrowing, because no sound changes that could have affected this word have taken place in Sinhala since at least the 13th century.

== List of words ==
In the following list, Tamil words are romanized in accordance with Tamil spelling. This results in seeming discrepancies in voicing between Sinhala words and their Tamil counterparts. Sinhala borrowing however has taken place on the basis of the sound of the Tamil words; thus, the word ampalam, [ambalam], logically results in the Sinhala spelling ambalama, and so forth. However, the Tamil language used here for comparison is Tamil as spoken in Sri Lanka.

Note: For information on the transcription used, see National Library at Calcutta romanization and Tamil script. Exceptions from the standard are the romanization of Sinhala long "ä" ([æː]) as "ää", and the non-marking of prenasalized stops.

Sinhala	Meaning	Tamil	Meaning	Type
ādāyama	Income	ādāyam	Profit	Trade
akkā	Elder sister	akkā	Elder sister	Kinship
agampadi	foreign soldier	agampaḍi	palace guard	Military
agaḷa	trench	akaḻi	ditch	Daily
accu	mould	accu	mould	Trade
aliyā	Elephant	alliyaṉ	Elephant	Daily
ambalama	Way-side rest	ambalam	Public place	Daily
ämbäṭṭayā	Barber	ampaṭṭaṉ	Barber	Trade
āṃgāṇiya	Stall (in a market)	aṅgāḍi	Market	Trade
ammā	Mother	ammā	Mother	Kinship
ānā	Man	ān	Man	Daily
āṇḍuva	Government	āṇṭāṉ	Rich man with many slaves	Administration
appā	Father (regional/colloquial)	appā	Father	Kinship
āppa	Hoppers	āppam	Hoppers	Food
araliya	Oleander	araḷi	Oleander	Botany
aḍaṃgu	containing	aḍaṅku	including	Trade
aḍakō	blockade	aḍaikōṭṭai	shelter	Military
aḍakkalama	insurance, halfway through	aḍaikkalam	deposit	Trade
aḍanteṭṭam		aḍantēṟṟam	inclusion	
aḍappaṃ	cattle disease	aḍaippaṉ	cattle disease	Daily
aḍō	oops (exclamation)	aḍā	oops (exclamation)	Daily
attammā	grandmother	āttāḷ	mother	Kinship
attikārama	authority	adikaram	authority	Administration
attā	grandmother	attaṉ/accaṉ	elder	Kinship
		accakāram, accāram	advance payment	Trade
attikkā	fig	attikkāy	fig	Food
atvaru, attara	high person, Dravidian Brahmin who held high position	attaṉ	superior/high person	Administration
attivārama	foundation	attivāram	foundation	Daily
andam		andam		
annāsi	pineapple	annāsi	pineapple	Food
attiya	mother	attai/annai	mother	Kinship
adō	expressing pity	antō	expressing pity	Daily
appacci	father	appācci	father	Kinship
appā!	exclamation	appā!	exclamation	Daily
avariya	Indigo plant	avuri	Indigo plant	Botany
ayyā	Elder brother	aiyā (see also Ayya)	Sir, father	Kinship
bā	Come	vā	Come	Daily
caṇḍiyā	Bandit, rowdy	saṇdiyar	Bandit	Daily
cīttaya	Chintz	cīttai	Chintz	Trade
ediriya	Opposition, hostility	edhiri	Opponent, enemy	Military
galkaṇḍuva	Sugar-candy	kaṟkaṇdu	Sugar-candy	Food
hirumaṇaya	Device prepared for grinding coconut	tirukumaṇai	Device prepared for grinding coconut	Daily
heṭṭu	Talk about buying goods at reduced price	ceṭṭu	Talk about buying goods at reduced price, thrifty	Trade
hori	Name of an itchy skin condition	cori	Name of an itchy skin condition	Daily
huṇḍuva	A metric used in measuring materials	cuṇḍu	A metric used in measuring materials	Daily
hurulla	Betel leaf	curuḷ	Betel leaf	Daily
iccāva	Flattery	iccakam	Flattery	Daily
iḍama	Site, land	idam	Place, site	Construction
īḷa	Asthma	īḷai	Asthma	Daily
ilakkaya	Target	ilakku	Target	Military
ilakkama	Number	ilakkam	Number	Trade
iḷandāriyā	Young man	iḷandāri	Young man	Daily
iḷavuva	Death, funeral	iḻavu	Death	Daily
iraṭṭa	Double, even number	iraṭṭai	Double, even number	Trade
īyam	Lead	īyam	Lead	Daily
jāḍiya	Jar	cāṭi	Jar	Daily
jōḍuva	Pair	jōdi/cōdi	Pair	Daily
hodi	Gravy	soti		Daily
kaḍalē	Chickpea	kadalai (paruppu)	Chickpea	Food
kaḍasarakkuva	Spice, curry stuffs	kadai + sarakku	Shop + Goods	Trade
kaḍaya	Shop	kadai	Shop	Trade
kaḍinama	Haste	kathi	speed	Daily
kaḍiyāḷama	Bridle	kadivāḷam	Bridle	Military
kaṃkāṇiyā	Overseer	kaṅkāṇi	Foreman	Administration
kalanda	A small measure of weight	kaḻañcu	Weight of 1.77 grams	Trade
kalavama	Mixture, blend	kalavai	Mixture	Daily
kālaya	Quarter	kāl	Quarter	Trade
kaḷudäävā	Donkey	kaḻudai	Donkey	Daily
kambiya	Wire	kambi	Wire	Trade
kāndama	Magnet	kāandam	Magnet	Trade
kaṇisama	Size	kaṇisam	Size, amount	Daily
kaṇṇāḍiya	Mirror, spectacles	kaṇṇāadi	Mirror, spectacles	Daily
kappama	Tribute	kappam	Tribute	Military
kappara	Small ship	kappal	Ship	Trade
kappi	Grit, bruised grain	kappi	Coarse grits in flour	Daily
kappiya	Pulley	kappi	Pulley	
kāvala	Protection	kaval		
kayippu	Catechu			
kayitālama	A type of cymbal			
kāppuva	Bracelet	kāappu	Bangle	Daily
kärapottā	Cockroach	karappaāṉ	Cockroach (SL)	Daily
karavaḷa	Dried fish	karuvāadu	Dried fish	Food
kāsiya	Coin	kāasu	Small change, coin	Trade
kasippu	Illicit liquor	kacippu	Illicit liquor	Trade
kaṭṭumarama	Catamaran	kaṭṭumaram	Catamaran	Trade
kayiyeliya	Cloth with coloured border	kaili	Multicoloured cloth worn by Muslims	Daily
keṇḍa	Calf	keṇdai(kkāl)	Calf	Daily
keṇḍiya	Pitcher	keṇṭi	Pitcher	Daily
kiṭṭu	Close, near	kiṭṭa	Close, near	Daily
koḍiya	Flag	kodi	Flag	Administration
kola / Kole	Leaf	kulai	Foliage / Young leaf	Botany
kollaya	Plunder, pillage	koḷḷai	Plunder	Military
kombuva	Name of the sign ෙ	kombu (lakaram)	Name of the sign ள	Daily
kōn	Part of a name	kōṉ(ar)	Name pertaining to members of the Iṭaiyar caste ("shepherd, king")	Personal name
kōṇama	A loin cloth for men	kōvaṇam	A loin cloth for men	Daily
koṇḍaya	Plait/bun of hair	koṇdai	Bun/plait of hair	Daily
kottamalli	Coriander	koṭhamalli	Coriander	Botany
koṭṭaya	Pillow	koṭṭai	Nut, round shape, pillow	Daily
kōvila	Hindu temple	kōyil	Temple	Daily
kūḍama	Shed, Resthouse	kūḍaram	Tent	Daily
kuḍaya	Umbrella	kudai	Umbrella	Daily
kūḍaya	Basket	koodai	Basket	Daily
kūḍuva	Nest, cage	koodu	Nest, small box	Daily
kulala/kuḷala	Pipe	kuḻal	Tube, musical pipe	Daily
kulappuva	Confusion	kuḻappu-	to confuse	Military
kūlama	Pond	kulam-	Pond	Agricultural Term
kurumbā	Young coconut	kurumbai	Young coconut	Food
kuliya	Rent	kooli	Rent, pay	Administration
kuṭṭama	A Pair			Daily
machan	Term of endearment along males	machan		Daily
Malaya	Hill country	malai	Hill	Place name
malli	Younger brother	malalai	Infant	Kinship
māmā	Maternal uncle	māmā	Maternal uncle	Kinship
marakkalaya	Boat, Ethnic Moor, Sampan	marakkalam	(Sailing) Boat	Fishing
massinā	Brother-in-law	macciṉaṉ	Brother-in-law	Kinship
mayil	Fur, any hair other than on the head/face	mayir		Daily
mella	Gentle, tame, obedient			Daily
mudala	Money	mudhal	Capital	Trade
mudalāli	Merchant, owner of a shop	mudhalāḷi	Merchant	Trade
mudali	Part of a name	mudhaliyār	Name of a caste	Personal name
mudiyanse	Part of a name	mudhaliyār	Name of a caste	Personal name
muḍukkuva	Narrow street, slum			Daily
mulu	whole, entire	mullu		Daily
munuburu	Grandson	marumakan (marumakana > manumaraka)	Descendant	Kinship
muranḍu	Obstinate, wanting to fight	muranḍu		Daily
muruṃgā	"Drumsticks", the edible fruits of the Drumstick tree (Moringa oleifera)	muruṅgai	Horse-radish tree	Food
mūḍiya	lid	mūḍi		Daily
mūṭṭi	Earthen cooking pot			Daily
mūṭṭuva	bale/bagful	mūṭtai		Daily
nāḍagama	Stage-play	naādagam	Drama, stage-play	Culture
nōṃjal, nōṃcal	feeble, unsteady			Daily
naṃgī	Younger sister	naṅgai	Younger sister	Kinship
neyyāḍam	Play	neyyāṭal	Oil bath taken on festive occasions	Culture
nōnḍi, nonḍi	lame	nonḍi		Daily
nūla	String/Thread	nūl		Daily
oppuva	Proof	oppu		Administration
ottē	Odd number	otṟai	Odd number	Trade
ottuva	Espionage	otṟu	Espionage	Administration
padakkama	Medal	padhakkam	Medal	Administration
pāḍama	Lesson	pāadam	Lesson	Culture
paḍiya	Wage	paṭi	Extra pay	Administration
pālama	Bridge	pāalam	Bridge	Construction
paḷiya	Revenge	paḻi	Guilt, revenge	Daily
palliya	Church/Mosque	palli	Church/Mosque	Daily
pandalama	Bower, shady place	pandhal	Bower, shady place	Daily
pandama	Torch	pandham	Torch	Religious
peruṃkāyam	Asafoetida	peruṃkāyam	Asafoetida	Daily
parippu	Lentils	paruppu	Lentils	Food
piṭṭu	A rice dish	piṭṭu	A rice dish	Food
poḍi	Small, little	podi	Small	Daily
poṭṭuva	Bindi	pottu		Daily
poraya	Fight	pōr	Fight	Military
poronduva	Agreement, promise	porundhu-	To fit, to agree	Daily
porottuva	Delay, waiting	poṟutthu	Having waited	Daily
pūccama	Boast, brag			Daily
pullē	Part of a name	Pillai	Part of a name (originally a title)	Personal name
pūṇa nūla	Sacred string/cord that Brahmins wear over their shoulder	poo-nool	Sacred string	Daily
saiva, sāiva	Shaivite	saiva	Shaivite	Daily
salli	Money	salli	Coin	Trade
saṇḍuva	Fight	saṇdai	Fight	Military
sekkuva	Oil mill	sekku		Daily
sembuva	Small metal pot	sembu		Daily
seṃkamālaya	jaundice			Daily
sereppuva	Sandals	seruppu	Sandals	Daily
sotti	Crippled, deformed	sothhai	Emaciated person, defect	Daily
suli	whirl, vortical			Daily
suruṭṭuva	Cigar	suruṭṭu	Cigar	Daily
takkāli	Tomato	thakkaāḷi	Tomato	Food
talluva	A push	thaḷḷu-	To push	Daily
tambiyā	Derogatory term for a Muslim man	tambi	Younger brother	Daily
tani	Alone	taṉi	Alone	Daily
täpäl	Postal	tabaāl	Postal, mail	Administration
tarama	Size, position, quantity	tharam	Quality, sort	Trade
taṭṭa	Bald	thaṭṭai	Baldness	Daily
tāliya	A necklace signifying marriage	tāli		Daily
tāttā	Father	thāathaā	Grandfather	Kinship
taṭṭuva	A knock	thaṭṭu-	To knock	Daily
tōḍuva	A hollow cylindrical earring	tōḍu		Daily
tunḍuva	bit/scrap	tunḍu		Daily
uḍäkkiya	A narrow drum	udukkai	A narrow drum	Daily
udavva	Help	udhavi	Help	Daily
ulukkuva	Sprain (of a joint)	suḷukku	Sprain	Daily
ūḷiyama	Tax payable by foreigners	ooḻiyam	Service	Administration
uraya	Covering/Case			Daily
urumaya	Rights/heritage	urimai	Rights/heritage	Administration
vaṭṭiya	Type of shallow basket			Daily
veri	Drunk	veṟi	intention, madness	Daily

== Verbs ==
Several verbs have been adopted into Sinhala from the Tamil language. The vast majority of these are compound verbs consisting of a Tamil origin primary verb and a Sinhala origin light verb.

Sinhala	සිංහල	Meaning	Tamil	Meaning
iranavā	ඉරනවා	To tear		
kiṭṭu venavā	කිට්ටු වෙනවා	To get close, to near		
kolla karanavā	කොල්ල කනවා	To plunder	Koḷḷai	
nōnḍi venavā	නෝන්ඩි වෙනවා	To be humiliated/embarrassed		
parakku venavā	පරක්කු වෙනවා	To be late/delayed		
pattu karanavā	පත්තු කරනවා	To light, to set on fire	patṟu-	To catch fire
pēru väṭenavā	පේරු වැටෙනවා	To fall to someone by chance	pēṟu	Luck ll
poḍi venavā	පොඩි වෙනවා	To be crushed/crumpled		
pūṭṭu karanavā	පූට්ටු කරනවා	To splice, to fasten together		
tallu karanavā	තල්ලු කරනවා	To push	thaḷḷu-	To push
taṭṭu karanavā	තට්ටු කරනවා	To knock	thaṭṭu-	
udav karanavā	උදව් කරනවා	To help	Utavi	
veḍi kanavā	වෙඩි කනවා	To have been shot	vedi	Shot, dynamite
veḍi tiyanavā	වෙඩි තියනවා	To shoot, to fire	vedi	Shot, dynamite
veri venavā	වෙරි වෙනවා	To become drunk	veri	

== See also ==
- Dutch loanwords in Sinhala
- English loanwords in Sinhala
- Portuguese loanwords in Sinhala
