= Sinhala idioms and proverbs =

List of Sinhala language idioms

Sinhala idioms (Sinhala: රූඩි, rūḍi) and colloquial expressions that are widely used to communicate figuratively, as with any other developed language. This page also contains a list of old and popular Sinhala proverbs, which are known as prastā piruḷu (ප්‍රස්තා පිරුළු) in Sinhala. Most of these phrases and translations can be found in the book Atīta Vākya Dīpaniya (අතීත වාක්‍ය දීපනිය), and in the Dictionary of the Proverbs of the Sinhalese.

== List of Sinhala idioms ==
Idiom	English translation	Meaning
inguru deela miris gaththa wage (ඉඟුරු දීලා මිරිස් ගත්තා වගේ)	Like exchanging ginger for chilli.	Getting rid of something bad, only to get something worse.
Rawulai kendai dekama beraganna bae (රැවුලයි කැඳයි දෙකම බේරගන්න බෑ)	One cannot drink porridge without getting some on his moustache.	A situation where two alternatives are equally Important. Similar English proverb- you cannot have the cake and eat it too.
Veradi gahata ketuwe (වැරදි ගහට කෙටුවේ)	Pecked at the wrong tree.	When someone gets into trouble trying to do something daunting.
Hisaradheta kotte maaru kala wagei (හිසරදේට කොට්ටේ මාරුකලා වගෙයි)	Like changing pillows to get rid of a head-ache.	One should try to fix a problem by finding its actual cause.
Gangata kepu ini wage (ගඟට කැපූ ඉනි වගේ)	Like cutting fence posts and throwing them into the river.	Describes some work that has been done in vain, with no returns or profit.
Giya loola maha ekaa lu (ගිය ලූලා මහා එකා ලු)	The eel that escaped your hands is the biggest one.	Describes the loss of a big opportunity.
Gahata poththa wagei (ගහට පොත්ත වගෙයි )	As close to each other as the bark is to the tree trunk.	Describes really close friends/people.
Miti thenin wathura bahinava (මිටි තැනින් වතුර බහිනවා)	Water flows down the lowest point.	When poor and innocent people are treated badly by others.
Anunge magul daata thamange aadare penvanna wagei (අනුන්ගෙ මගුල්දාට තමන්ගෙ ආදරය පෙන්වන්නා වගෙයි)	Like the one who shows their hospitality at someone else's wedding.	When someone takes advantage of a particular favourable situation, and tries to take credit for it.
Katugaale pipunu mala wagei (කටුගාලෙ පිපුනු මල වගෙයි)	Like the flower that blossoms among the brambles.	Usually refers to a person who remains righteous even if he's surrounded by corrupt and immoral people.
Angey indan kana kanawalu (අඟේ ඉදන් කණ කනවාලු)	To feed on the ear while sitting on the horn.	Describes an instance where someone hurts or takes advantage of you while being by your side.
Mitey un kurulla arala gahey un kurulla alleemata giya wagei (මිටේ උන් කුරුල්ලා ඇරලා ගහේ උන් කුරුල්ලා ඇල්ලීමට ගියා වගෙයි)	Like letting off the bird in hand and trying to catch the one on the tree.	Same meaning as "a bird in the hand is worth two in the bush".
Oruwa peraluna pita hondai keeva wagei (ඔරුව පෙරළුණ පිට හොඳයි කීවා වගෙයි)	Like saying the underside is better when the boat capsizes.	When a person tries to the see the bright side of bad situation.
Angen atayak gannawa wagei (ඇඟෙන් ඇටයක් ගන්නවා වගෙයි)	Like asking for a bone out of one's body.	When a person is extremely reluctant to do a favour.
Allapu aththath nae, paya gahapu aththath nae (අල්ලපු අත්තත් නෑ, පය ගහපු අත්තත් නෑ)	To lose both the branch he held on to, and that on which his feet rested.	When someone tries to achieve more and ends up losing what he had in the first place.
Aandi hath denaage kenda haliya wagei (ආඬි හත්දෙනාගේ කැඳ හැලිය වගෙයි)	Like the cunjee (porridge) pot of the seven Andiyas.	A situation where everyone agrees to contribute something, but no one actually does, with everyone relying on others' contributions.
Balalun lavaa kos ata baawa wagei (බළලුන් ලවා කොස් ඇට බෑව්වා වගෙයි)	Like getting cats to take roasted jak seeds out of the fire.	When a person is used to serve the purposes of another.
Yakaata baya nam sohone geval hadanne hehe (යක්කාට බය නම් සොහොනේ ගෙවල් හදන්නේ නැහැ)	Those who are afraid of the devil won't build houses on the cemetery.	If you're afraid of something, you won't knowingly place yourself in its domain.

== Sinhala proverbs ==
Proverb	English translation	Meaning
Pirunu kale diya nosele (පිරුණු කළේ දිය නොසෙලේ)	A vessel filled with water does not make a noise when shaken.	Those with little knowledge talk too much, while the well-informed remain silent.
Ugurata hora beheth ganna bae (උගුරට හොරා ඛෙහෙත් ගන්න බෑ)	You cannot swallow medicine pills without letting the throat know.	You can not hide the truth from yourself.
Uda pannoth bima vatelu (උඩ පැන්නොත් බිම වැටේලූ)	What goes up, must come down.	Anything that has been raised or has risen must eventually fall down.
Unahapuluwage patiya uta manikak lu (උනහපුළුවගෙ පැටියා ඌට මැණිකක්ලූ)	The loris's baby is a gem to her.	A worthless thing to one person might be very valuable to another.
Aththin aththata panina kurulla themee nasi (අත්තින් අත්තට පනින කුරුල්ලා තෙමී නසී)	The bird that jumps from branch to branch to avoid the rain, dies (from the cold).	Switching sides or continuously running away from a problem will hurt you in the long run.
Andayaata mona pahan eliyada (අන්ධයාට මොන පහන් එලියද)	Of what use is a lamp to a blind man?	People should not be given things that they are not capable of using.
Hadissiyata koros kateth athalanta barilu (හදිස්සියට් කොරොස් කටෙත් අතලන්ට බැරිලූ)	When in haste, one cannot put his hand even in a crock pot.	Rushing and hurrying things makes you overlook simple things.
Kana kokaage suda penenne igilunaamalu (කණ කොකාගෙ සුද පෙනෙන්නේ ඉගිලුනාමලූ)	The whiteness of the crane appears only when it flies.	People realize the value of something only when it's gone.
Ginipenellen batakaapu miniha kanaamadiri eliyatath bayayi lu (ගිනිපෙනෙල්ලෙන් බැටකාපු මිනිහා කණාමැදිරි එළියටත් බයයි ලු)	The man who has been beaten by a fire-brand dreads the light of even a firefly.	When someone goes through a traumatic experience, he/she tries to avoid everything that even closely resembles that experience.
Giya hakurata naadanne, thiyena hakura rakaganne (ගිය හකුරට නාඩන්නේ, තියෙන හකුර රැකගන්නේ)	To save the remaining piece of jaggery without lamenting over the lost one.	One should learn to move on in the event of a loss.
Rae vetunu valeh daval vatenne nae (රෑ වැටුනු වලේ දවල් වැටෙන්නේ නෑ)	The man who fell into the pit at night, does not fall into it again in broad daylight.	People should learn from their mistakes.
Pala athi gahey koyi sathath vahanawalu (ඵල ඇති ගහේ කොයි සතත් වහනවලු)	A fruitful tree attracts every kinds of creatures.	Success and wealth attracts many people.
Thalena yakade dutuwaama aachaariya uda pana pana thalanawalu (තැළෙන යකඩේ දුටුවාම ආචාරියා උඩ පැන පැන තළනවාලු)	When the blacksmith finds a malleable iron, he leaps (with pleasure) to bring his hammer down.	The more one yields, the more one is beaten.
