= Sinhala language =

Indo-Aryan language of Sri Lanka

Sinhala
- සිංහල භාෂාව; Siṁhala Bhāṣāva also Sinhala Basawa
- Pronunciation: IPA: [ˈsiŋɦələ]
- Native to: Sri Lanka
- Ethnicity: Sinhalese
- Speakers: L1: 18 million (2021); L2: 2 million (2021); Total: 20 million (2021)
- Language family: Indo-European: Indo-Iranian; Indo-Aryan; Southern Zone; Sinhalese–Maldivian; Sinhala
- Writing system: Sinhala script; Sinhala Braille

Official status
- Official language in: Sri Lanka
- Regulated by: National Institute of Education, Sri Lanka

Language codes
- ISO 639-1: si
- ISO 639-2: sin
- ISO 639-3: sin
- Glottolog: sinh1246
- Linguasphere: 59-ABB-a
- Sinhalese is the majority language where the vast majority are first language speakers Sinhalese is the majority language, with other languages being spoken largely or as a second language (such as Malay and Tamil) Sinhala is a minority language and Tamil is Majority language

Sinhala (/ˈsɪnhələ, ˈsɪŋələ/ SIN-hə-lə, SING-ə-lə; Sinhala: සිංහල, siṁhala, [ˈsiŋɦələ]), sometimes called Sinhalese (/ˌsɪn(h)əˈliːz, ˌsɪŋ(ɡ)əˈliːz/ SIN-(h)ə-LEEZ, SING-(g)ə-LEEZ), is an Indo-Aryan language primarily spoken by the Sinhalese people of Sri Lanka, who make up the largest ethnic group on the island, numbering about 16 million. It is also the first language of about 2 million other Sri Lankans, as of 2001. It is written in the Sinhalese script.

The language has two main varieties, written and spoken, and is a notable example of the linguistic phenomenon known as diglossia.

Sinhala is one of the two national languages of Sri Lanka, along with Tamil. Along with Pali, it played a major role in the development of Theravada Buddhist literature.

Early forms of the Sinhalese language are attested to as early as the 3rd century BCE. The language of these inscriptions, still retaining long vowels and aspirated consonants, is a Prakrit similar to Magadhi, a regional associate of the Middle-Indian Prakrits that had been spoken during the lifetime of the Buddha. The most closely related languages to Sinhalese are the Vedda language and the Maldivian languages; the former is an endangered indigenous creole still spoken by a minority of Sri Lankans, which mixes Sinhalese with an isolate of unknown origin. Old Sinhalese borrowed various aspects of Vedda into its main Indo-Aryan substrate.

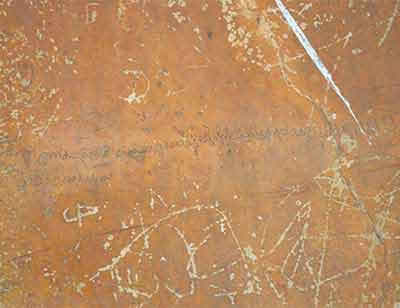
There are 1,500 poems written in the 6th–10th centuries on the Sigiriya Mirror Wall. These poems are believed to have been composed by pilgrims who came to visit the Buddhist monastery of Sigiriya, which was active at this time.

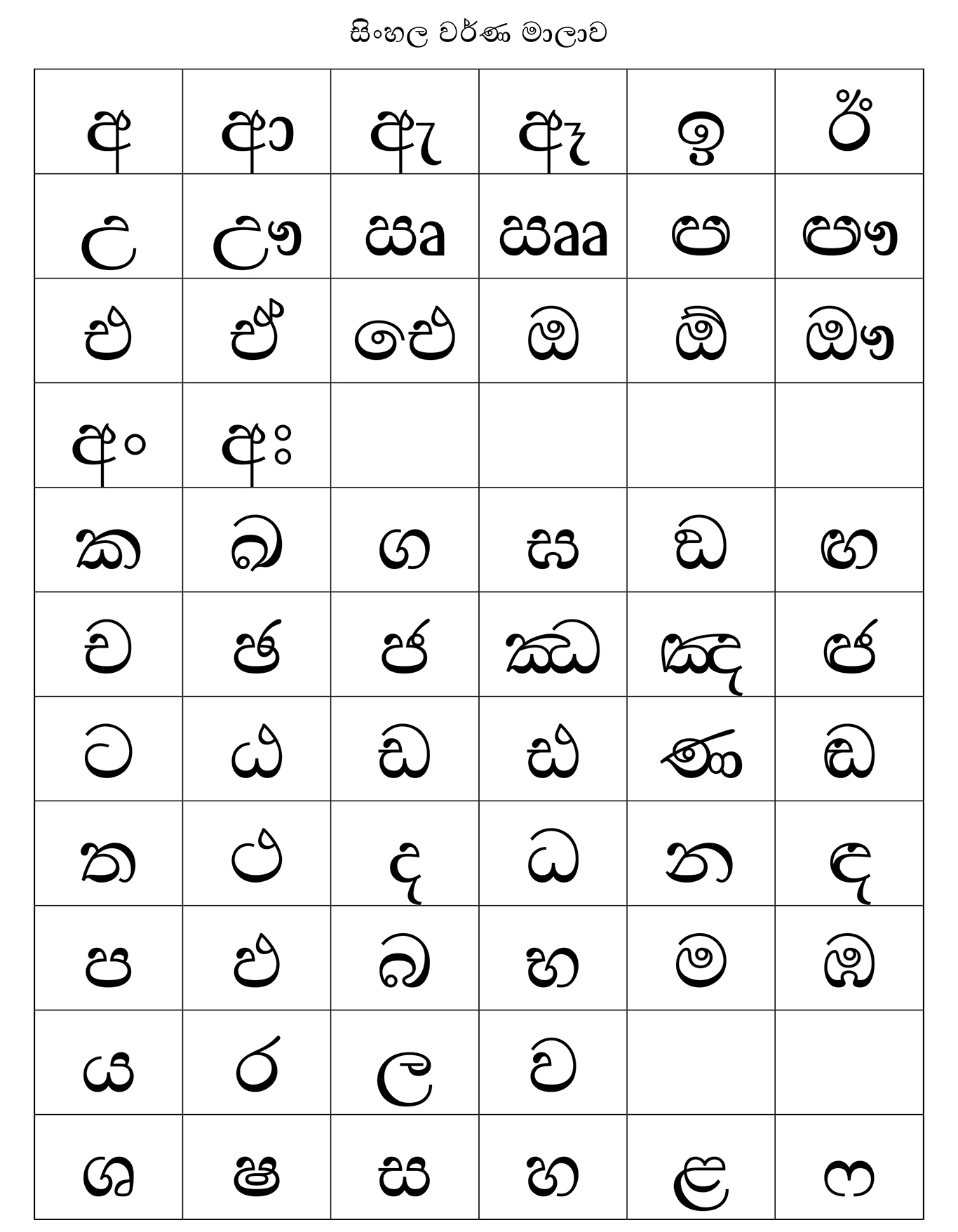
Letters of the Sinhalese script

== Etymology ==
Sinhala (Siṅhala) is a Sanskrit term; the corresponding Middle Indo-Aryan (Eḷu) word is Sīhala. The name is a derivative of the Sanskrit word for 'lion' siṁha. The name is sometimes glossed as 'abode of lions', and attributed to a supposed former abundance of lions on the island.

== History ==
According to the chronicle Mahāvaṃsa, written in Pali, Prince Vijaya of the Vanga Kingdom and his entourage merged in Sri Lanka with later settlers from the Pandya kingdom. In the following centuries, there was substantial immigration from Eastern India, including additional migration from the Vanga Kingdom (Bengal), as well as Kalinga and Magadha. This influx led to an admixture of features of Eastern Prakrits.

=== Stages of historical development ===
The development of Sinhala is divided into four epochs:

- Elu Prakrit (3rd c. BCE to 4th c. CE)
- Proto-Sinhala (4th c. CE to 8th c. CE)
- Medieval Sinhala (8th c. CE to 13th c. CE)
- Modern Sinhala (13th c. CE to the present)

=== Phonetic development ===
The most important phonetic developments of Sinhala include:

- the loss of aspiration as a distinction for plosive consonants (e.g. kanavā "eating" corresponds to Sanskrit khādati, Hindustani khānā)
- the loss of original vowel length distinction; long vowels in the modern language are found in loanwords (e.g. vibāgaya "exam" < Sanskrit vibhāga) or as a result of sandhi, either after elision of intervocalic consonants (e.g. dānavā "to put" < damanavā) or in originally compound words.
- the simplification of consonant clusters and geminate consonants into geminates and single consonants respectively (e.g. Sanskrit viṣṭā "time" > Helu viṭṭa > Modern Sinhala viṭa)
- development of /tʃ/ to /s/ and/or /ɦ/ (e.g. san̆da/han̆da "moon" corresponds to Sanskrit candra) and development of /dʒ/ to /d/ (e.g. dæla "web" corresponds to Sanskrit jāla)
- development of prenasalized consonants from Sanskrit nasal + voiced stops (as in han̆da)
- retention of initial /w/ and /j/, the latter only shared with Kashmiri (as in viṭa and yutu "fit, proper" < Sanskrit yukta)

=== Western vs. Eastern Prakrit features ===
According to Wilhelm Geiger, an example of a possible Western feature in Sinhala is the retention of initial /v/ which developed into /b/ in the Eastern languages (e.g. Sanskrit viṁśati "twenty", Sinhala visi-, Hindi bīs). This is disputed by Muhammad Shahidullah who says that Helu Prakrit branched off from the Eastern Prakrits prior to this change. He cites the edicts of Ashoka, no copy of which shows this sound change.

An example of an Eastern feature is the ending -e for masculine nominative singular (instead of Western -o) in Helu. There are several cases of vocabulary doublets, one example being the words mæssā ("fly") and mækkā ("flea"), which both correspond to Sanskrit makṣikā but stem from two regionally different Prakrit words macchiā (Western Prakrits) and makkhikā (as in Eastern Prakrits like Pali).

=== Pre-1815 Sinhalese literature ===
In 1815, the island of Ceylon came under British rule. During the career of Christopher Reynolds as a Sinhalese lecturer at the School of African and Oriental Studies, University of London, he extensively researched the Sinhalese language and its pre-1815 literature. The Sri Lankan government awarded him the Sri Lanka Ranjana medal for his work. He wrote the 377-page An anthology of Sinhalese literature up to 1815, selected by the UNESCO National Commission of Ceylon

=== Substratum influence in Sinhala ===
According to Wilhelm Geiger, Sinhala has features that set it apart from other Indo-Aryan languages. Some of the differences can be explained by the substrate influence of the parent stock of the Vedda language. Sinhala has many words that are only found in Sinhala, or shared between Sinhala and Vedda and not etymologically derivable from Middle or Old Indo-Aryan. Possible examples include kola for leaf in Sinhala and Vedda (although others suggest a Dravidian origin for this word.), dola for pig in Vedda and offering in Sinhala. Other common words are rera for wild duck, and gala for stones (in toponyms used throughout the island, although others have also suggested a Dravidian origin). There are also high frequency words denoting body parts in Sinhala, such as olluva for head, kakula for leg, bella for neck and kalava for thighs, that are derived from pre-Sinhalese languages of Sri Lanka. The oldest known Sinhala grammar, Sidatsan̆garavā, written in the 13th century CE, recognised a category of words that exclusively belonged to early Sinhala. The grammar lists naram̆ba (to see) and koḷom̆ba (fort or harbour) as belonging to an indigenous source. Koḷom̆ba is the source of the name of the commercial capital Colombo.

=== South Dravidian substratum influence ===
The consistent left branching syntax and the loss of aspirated stops in Sinhala is attributed to a probable South Dravidian substratum effect. This has been explained by a period of prior bilingualism:

"The earliest type of contact in Sri Lanka, not considering the aboriginal Vedda languages, was that which occurred between South Dravidian and Sinhala. It seems plausible to assume prolonged contact between these two populations as well as a high degree of bilingualism. This explains why Sinhala looks deeply South Dravidian for an Indo-Aryan language. There is corroboration in genetic findings."

=== Influences from neighbouring languages ===
In addition to many Tamil loanwords, several phonetic and grammatical features also present in neighbouring Dravidian languages set modern spoken Sinhala apart from its Northern Indo-Aryan relatives. These features are evidence of close interactions with Dravidian speakers. Some of the features that may be traced to Dravidian influence are:

- the loss of aspiration
- the use of the attributive verb of kiyana "to say" as a subordinating conjunction with the meanings "that" and "if", e.g.:

ඒක අලුත් කියලා මම දන්නවා
ēka aḷut kiyalā mama dannavā
it new having-said I know
"I know that it is new."

ඒක අලුත් ද කියලා මම දන්නේ නැහැ
ēka aḷut da kiyalā mama dannē næhæ
it new Q having-said I know-EMP not
"I do not know whether it is new."

=== European influence ===
As a result of about 3 centuries of colonial rule, interaction, settlement and assimilation, modern Sinhala contains some Portuguese, Dutch and English loanwords.

=== Influences on other languages ===
Macanese Patois or Macau Creole (known as Patuá to its speakers) is a creole language derived mainly from Malay, Sinhala, Cantonese, and Portuguese, which was originally spoken by the Macanese people of the Portuguese colony of Macau. It is now spoken by a few families in Macau and in the Macanese diaspora.

The language developed first mainly among the descendants of Portuguese settlers who often married women from Malacca and Sri Lanka rather than from neighbouring China, so the language had strong Malay and Sinhala influence from the beginning.

== Accents and dialects ==
The Sinhala language has different types of variations which are commonly identified as dialects and accents. Among those variations, regional variations are prominent. Some of the well-known regional variations of Sinhala language are:

1. The Uva Province variation (Monaragala, Badulla).
2. The southern variation (Matara, Galle).
3. The up-country variation (Kandy, Matale).
4. The Sabaragamu variation (Kegalle, Balangoda).

=== Uva regional variation in relation to grammar ===
People from Uva province also have a unique linguistic variation in relation to the pronunciation of words. In general, Sinhala singular words are pluralized by adding suffixes like -o, -hu, -wal or -waru. But when it comes to Monaragala, the situation is somewhat different as when nouns are pluralized a nasal sound is added.

General way of pluralizing Sinhala words	The way Uva people pluralize words
kàntawǝ kantàwò ǝ ò woman women	lindha lindha+n {} lindhan well wells
potǝ pot ǝ Ø book books	oya oya+n {} oyan stream streams
lindhǝ lindhǝ+wal ǝ {+ wal} well wells	

=== Southern variation ===
The Kamath language (an indigenous language of paddy culture) used by the Southerners is somewhat different from the 'Kamath language' used in other parts (Uva, Kandy) of Sri Lanka as it is marked with a systematic variation; 'boya' at the end of the majority of nouns as the examples below show.

Crops: Kurakkan boya (bran)
Rambakan boya (banana)
Tools: Thattu boya (bucket)
Other words: Nivahan boya (home)

Here the particular word 'boya' means 'a little' in the Southern region and at the end of most of nouns, 'boya' is added regularly. This particular word 'boya' is added to most words by the Southern villages as a token of respect towards the things (those things can be crops, tools etc.) they are referring to.

=== Kandy, Kegalle and Galle people ===
The contrast among the regional variations used by Kandy, Kegalle and Galle people in relation to pronunciation
The common Sinhala variation	Different regional variations of Sinhala language	Notes
Ayye heta wapuranna enwada? (Elder Brother, Are you coming to sow tomorrow?)	Ayya heta wapuranta enawada? (Kandy) Ayye heta wapuranda enawada? (Kegalle) Ayye heta wapuranna enawai? (Galle)	Here the Kandy people say 'Ayya' while the Kegalle and Galle people say 'Ayye'. Also, Kandy people add a 'ta' sound at the end of verbs while the Kegalle people add a 'da' sound. But Galle people's regional variation is not visible in relation to this particular verb; 'wapuranawa' (to sow). Yet their unique regional variation is visible in relation to the second verb which is 'enawai' (coming) as they add 'ai' at the end of most verbs. A point to remember the ‘ai’ at the end of a word could also be used in the context of future tense

Even though the Kandy, Kegalle and Galle people pronounce words with slight differences, the Sinhalese can understand the majority of the sentences.

=== Diglossia ===
In Sinhala there is distinctive diglossia, where the literary language and the spoken language differ from each other in significant ways. While the lexicon can vary continuously between formal and informal contexts, there is a sharp contrast between two distinct systems for syntax and morphology. The literary language is used in writing for all forms of prose, poetry, and for official documents, but also orally for TV and radio news broadcasts. The spoken language is used in everyday life and spans informal and formal contexts. Religious sermons, university lectures, political speeches, and personal letters occupy an intermediate space where features from both spoken and literary Sinhala are used together, and choices about which to include give different impressions of the text.

A number of syntactic and morphological differences exist between the two varieties. The most apparent difference is the absence of subject-verb agreement in spoken Sinhala. Agreement is the hallmark of literary Sinhala, and is the sole characteristic used in determining whether a given example of Sinhala is in the spoken or literary variety. Other distinctions include:

- The copula ව‌ෙනවා (venavā), lit. 'happening' in equational sentences is required in literary but prohibited in spoken Sinhala.
- The accusative and locative cases are missing in colloquial spoken Sinhala (but recovered in formal speech).

== Writing system ==
ආයුබෝවන් (āyubōwan) means "welcome", literally wishing one a long life

The Sinhala script, (Sinhala hodiya), is based on the ancient Brahmi script, and is thus a Brahmic script along with most Indian scripts and many Southeast Asian scripts. The Sinhala script is closely related to Grantha script and Khmer script, but it has also taken some elements from the related Kadamba script.

The writing system for Sinhala is an abugida, where the consonants are written with letters while the vowels are indicated with diacritics (pilla) on those consonants, unlike alphabets like English where both consonants and vowels are full letters, or abjads like Urdu where vowels need not be written at all. Also, when a diacritic is not used, an "inherent vowel", either /a/ or /ə/, is understood, depending on the position of the consonant within the word. For example, the letter ක k on its own indicates ka, realized as /ka/ in stressed syllables and /kə/ in unstressed syllables. The other monophthong vowels are written: කා /kaː/, කැ /kæ/, and කෑ /kæː/ (after the consonant); කි /ki/ and කී /kiː/ (above the consonant); කු /ku/ and කූ /kuː/ (below the consonant); කෙ /ke/ and කේ /keː/ (before the consonant); and lastly, කො /ko/ and කෝ /koː/ (surrounding the consonant). For simple /k/ without a following vowel, a vowel-cancelling diacritic called හල් කිරීම (/hal kiriːmə/, hal kirima) is used, creating ක් /k/.

There are also a few diacritics for consonants, such as /r/ in special circumstances, although the tendency now is to spell words with the full letter ර /r/, with a hal kirima on whichever consonant has no vowel following it. One word that is still spelt with an "r" diacritic is ශ්‍රී, as in ශ්‍රී ලංකාව (Śri Lankāwa). The "r" diacritic is the curved line under the first letter ("ශ" → "ශ්‍ර"). A second diacritic representing the vowel sound /iː/ completes the word ("ශ්‍ර" → "ශ්‍රී").

Several of these diacritics occur in two or more forms, and the form used depends on the shape of the consonant letter. Vowels also have independent letters, but these are only used at the beginning of words where there is no preceding consonant to add a diacritic to.

The complete script consists of about 60 letters, 18 for vowels and 42 for consonants. However, only 57 (16 vowels and 41 consonants) are required for writing colloquial spoken Sinhala (śuddha Sinhala). The rest indicate sounds that have been merged in the course of linguistic change, such as the aspirates, and are restricted to Sanskrit and Pali loan words. One letter (ඦ), representing the sound /ⁿd͡ʒa/, is attested in the script, although only a few words using this letter are known (වෑංඦන, ඉඦූ).

The Sinhala script is written from left to right, and is mainly used for Sinhala. It is also used for the liturgical languages Pali and Sanskrit, which are important in Buddhism and academic works. The alphabetic sequence is similar to those of other Brahmic scripts:

a/ā æ/ǣ i/ī u/ū [ŗ] e/ē [ai] o/ō [au] k [kh] g [gh] ṅ c [ch] j [jh] [ñ] ṭ [ṭh] ḍ [ḍh] [ṇ] t [th] d [dh] n p [ph] b [bh] m y r l v/w [ś ṣ] s h [ḷ] f

== Phonology ==
External audio
- "The Sound of the Sinhala language" (ILoveLanguages!)

Sinhala has a smaller consonant inventory than most Indo-Aryan languages, but simultaneously has a larger vowel inventory than most. As an insular Indo-Aryan language, it and Dhivehi have features divergent from rest of the Indo-Aryan languages. Sinhala's nasal consonants are unusual among Indo-Aryan languages for lacking the retroflex nasal /ɳ/ while retaining nasals in the other four positions. Sinhala and Dhivehi are together unique for having prenasalised consonants, which are not found in any other Indo-Aryan language.

=== Consonants ===
Sinhala has prenasalised consonants, or 'half nasal' consonants, but has lost the distinction between aspirated and unaspirated stops. It still has the distinction between dental/alveolar and retroflex stops. A short homorganic nasal occurs before a voiced stop, it is both shorter than a nasal alone and shorter than a sequence of nasal plus stop. The nasal is syllabified with the onset of the following syllable, which means that the moraic weight of the preceding syllable is left unchanged. For example, tam̆ba 'copper' contrasts with tamba 'boil'. Sinhala is one of only three languages reported to have a contrast between prenasalized consonants and their corresponding clusters, along with Fula and Selayarese, although the nature of this contrast is debated. For example,

Four-way contrast in Sinhala
Sinhala script	IPA	ISO 15919	Translation
කද	[ka.d̪ə]	kada	shoulder pole
කඳ	[ka.ⁿd̪ə]	kan̆da	trunk
කන්ද	[kan̪.d̪ə]	kanda	hill
කන	[ka.nə]	kana	earhill

A prenasalized consonant [ᵐb] in Sri Lanka Malay ga.mbar has a shorter nasal segment and a longer preceding vowel.

An [mb] cluster in Sri Lanka Malay sam.bal has a longer nasal and a shorter preceding vowel.

Sri Lankan Malay has been in contact with Sinhala a long time and has also developed prenasalized stops. The spectrograms on the right show the word gambar with a prenasalized stop and the word sambal with a sequence of nasal+voiced stop, yet not prenasalized. The difference in the length of the [m] part is clearly visible. The nasal in the prenasalized word is much shorter than the nasal in the other word.

All consonants other than the prenasalised consonants, /ŋ/, /ɸ/, /h/, and /ʃ/ can be geminated (occur as double consonants), but only between vowels. In contexts that otherwise trigger gemination, prenasalised consonants become the corresponding nasal-voiced consonant sequence (e.g. /ⁿd/ is replaced with /nd/) and /h/ becomes /sː/.

		Labial	Dental/ Alveolar	Retroflex	Palatal	Velar	Glottal
Nasal		m	n		ɲ	(ŋ)	
Stop/ Affricate	voiceless	p	t	ʈ	tʃ	k	
Stop/ Affricate	voiced	b	d	ɖ	dʒ	ɡ	
Stop/ Affricate	prenasalised	ᵐb	ⁿd	ᶯɖ		ᵑɡ	
Fricative		(f~ɸ)	s		(ʃ)		h
Trill			r				
Approximant		ʋ	l		j		

/ʃ/ is found in learned borrowings from Sanskrit and English, including in the honorific ශ්‍රී (śrī), found in phrases including the country's name, Sri Lanka (ශ්‍රී ලංකා, /ʃriː laŋkaː/). /f~ɸ/ is restricted to loans, typically for English. They are commonly sometimes replaced by /s/ and /p/ respectively.

/ŋ/ only occurs word-finally and before velar consonants. In native words, word-final nasals collapse to /ŋ/, which is then in complementary distribution with other nasals. In loanwords, however, final /m/ can also be found, introducing a contrast, and both /ŋ/ and /n/ occur before /j/. /ɲ/ mostly appears in loanwords and is always geminated between vowels.

=== Vowels ===
Sinhala vowel chart, from Perera & Jones (1919:5)

Sinhala has seven vowel qualities, with a phonemic vowel length distinction between long and short for all qualities, giving a total inventory of 14 vowels. The long vowel /əː/ is not present in native Sinhala words, but instead is found in certain English loanwords. Like in non-rhotic dialects of English, this long vowel can be represented graphically by the short vowel followed by an ⟨r⟩ (ර්), as in ෂර්ට් /ʃəːʈ/ ("shirt").

	Front		Central		Back	
	short	long	short	long	short	long
Close	i	iː			u	uː
Mid	e	eː	ə	(əː)	o	oː
Open	æ	æː	a	aː		

/a/ and /ə/ have a largely complementary distribution, found primarily in stressed and unstressed syllables, respectively. However, there are certain contrasting pairs between the two phonemes, particularly between homographs කර /karə/ ("shoulder") and කර /kərə/ ("to do"), as well as certain loanwords with /ə/ in the first syllable. In writing, /a/ and /ə/ are both spelt without a vowel sign attached to the consonant letter, so the patterns of stress in the language must be used to determine the correct pronunciation. Stress is largely predictable and only contrastive between words in relatively few cases, so this does not present a problem for determining the pronunciation of a given word.

Nasalisation of vowels is common in certain environments, particularly before a prenasalised consonant. Nasalised /ãː/ and /æ̃ː/ exist as marginal phonemes, only present in certain interjections.

=== Phonotactics ===
Most Sinhala syllables are of the form CV. Native Sinhalese words are limited in syllable structure to (C)V(C), V̄, and CV̄(C), where V is a short vowel, V̄ is a long vowel, and C is a consonant. Exceptions exist for the marginal segment CC. Prenasalised plosives are restricted to occurring intervocalically, and cannot end a syllable. Much more complicated consonant clusters are allowed in loan words, particularly from Sanskrit and English, an example being ප්‍රශ්‍නය praśnaya ("question"). Words cannot end in nasals other than /ŋ/. Because of historical loss of the fricative /h/ in the suffix /-hu/, /-u/ at the end of a word behaves as its own syllable. Word-final long vowels often shorten, mostly after a heavy syllable (one ending in a consonant or long vowel).

=== Stress ===
The first syllable of each word is stressed, with the exception of the verb කරනවා /kərənəˈwaː/ ("to do") and all of its inflected forms where the first syllable is unstressed. Syllables using long vowels are always stressed. The remainder of the syllables are unstressed if they use a short vowel, unless they are immediately followed by one of: a CCV syllable, final /j(i)/ (-යි), final /wu/ (-වු), or a final consonant without a following vowel. The sound sequence /ha/ is always stressed, except after the vowel sound /i/ (-ඉ) and not before a consonant without a following vowel.

== Morphology ==
=== Nominal morphology ===
The main features marked on Sinhala nouns are case, number, definiteness and animacy.

==== Cases ====
Sinhala distinguishes several cases. The five primary cases are the nominative, accusative, dative, genitive, and ablative. Some scholars also suggest that it has a locative and instrumental case. However, for inanimate nouns the locative and genitive, and instrumental and ablative, are identical. In addition, for animate nouns these cases formed by placing atiŋ ("with the hand") and laᵑgə ("near") directly after the nominative.

The brackets with most of the vowel length symbols indicate the optional shortening of long vowels in certain unstressed syllables.

	animate		inanimate	
	singular	plural	singular	plural
nominative	miniha(ː)	minissu	potə	pot
accusative	miniha(ː)wə	minissu(nwə)	potə	pot
dative	miniha(ː)ʈə	minissu(ɳ)ʈə	potəʈə	potwələʈə
genitive	miniha(ː)ge(ː)	minissu(ŋ)ge(ː)	pote(ː)	potwələ
locative	miniha(ː) laᵑgə	minissu(n) laᵑgə	pote(ː)	potwələ
ablative	miniha(ː)geŋ	minissu(n)geŋ	poteŋ	potwaliŋ
instrumental	miniha(ː) atiŋ	minissu(n) atiŋ	poteŋ	potwaliŋ
vocative	miniho(ː)	minissuneː	-	-
Gloss	'man'	'men'	'book'	'books'

==== Number marking ====
Forming plurals in Sinhala is unpredictable. In Sinhala animate nouns, the plural is marked with -o(ː), a long consonant plus -u, or with -la(ː). Most inanimates mark the plural through disfixation. Loanwords from English mark the singular with ekə, and do not mark the plural. This can be interpreted as a singulative number.

SG	ammaː	deviyaː	horaː	potə	reddə	kantoːruvə	satiyə	basekə	paːrə
PL	amməla(ː)	deviyo(ː)	horu	pot	redi	kantoːru	sati	bas	paːrəval
Gloss	'mother(s)'	'god(s)'	'thie(f/ves)'	'book(s)'	'cloth(es)'	'office(s)'	'week(s)'	'bus(es)'	'street(s)'

On the left hand side of the table, plurals are longer than singulars. On the right hand side, it is the other way round, with the exception of paːrə "street". Animate lexemes are mostly in the classes on the left-hand side, while inanimate lexemes are most often in the classes on the right hand.

==== Indefinite article ====
The indefinite article is -ek for animates and -ak for inanimates. The indefinite article exists only in the singular, where its absence marks definiteness. In the plural, (in)definiteness does not receive special marking.

=== Verbal morphology ===
Spoken Sinhala does not mark person, number or gender on the verb (unlike literary Sinhala, which marks person, number, and gender on the verb). In other words, there is no subject–verb agreement.

	1st class		2nd class		3rd class	
	verb	verbal adjective	verb	verbal adjective	verb	verbal adjective
present (future)	kanəwaː	kanə	arinəwaː	arinə	pipenəwaː	pipenə
past	kæːwaː	kæːwə	æriyaː	æriyə	pipunaː	pipunə
anterior	kaːlaː	kaːpu	ærəlaː	ærəpu	pipilaː	pipicca
simultaneous	kanə kanə / ka kaa(spoken)		arinə arinə / æra æra(spoken)		pipenə pipenə/ pipi pipi(spoken)	
infinitive	kannə/kanḍə		arinnə/arinḍə		pipennə/pipenḍə	
emphatic form	kanneː		arinneː		pipenneː	
gloss	eat		open		blossom	

==== Verb Classes ====
Sinhala has 4 classes of verb stems from the same root. Verb stems can be either volitive, involitive, or the causative of a volitive or involitive stem. From the root balə "to see":

Class	Present Stem	English Gloss
Volitive	balənəwa	"look, read"
Involitive	bælenəwa	"see"
Volitive causative	baləwənəwa	"make (someone) look"
Involitive causative	bæləwenəwa	"make (someone) see"

=== Umlaut ===
In Sinhala, roots often undergo umlaut, a process in which a suffix causes any /a/, /o/, or /u/ in the root to become /æ/, /e/, or /i/, respectively.

== Syntax ==
- Left-branching language (see branching), which means that determining elements are usually put in front of what they determine (see example below).
- An exception to this is formed by statements of quantity which usually stand behind what they define.

මල් හතර
/mal hatərə/
flowers four
"the four flowers"
(it can be argued that the numeral is the head in this construction, and the flowers the modifier, so that a more literal English rendering would be "a floral foursome")

- SOV (subject–object–verb) word order, common to most left-branching languages.
- As is common in left-branching languages, it has no prepositions, only postpositions (see Adposition).

පොත යට
/potə jaʈə/
book under
"under the book"

- Sinhala has no copula. There are two existential verbs, which are used for locative predications, but these verbs are not used for predications of class-membership or property-assignment, unlike the verb "is" in English.

මම පොහොසත්
/mamə poːsat/
I rich
"I am rich"

- There are almost no conjunctions as English that or whether, but only non-finite clauses that are formed by the means of participles and verbal adjectives.

පොත් ලියන මිනිසා
/pot liənə minisa/
books writing man
"The man who writes books"

== Semantics ==
There is a four-way deictic system (which is rare): There are four demonstrative stems (see demonstrative pronouns):

1. මේ /meː/ "here, close to the speaker"
2. ඕ /oː/ "there, close to the person addressed"
3. අර /arə/ "there, close to a third person, visible"
4. ඒ /eː/ "there, close to a third person, not visible"

=== Use of තුමා (thuma) ===
Sinhalese has an all-purpose odd suffix තුමා (thuma) which when suffixed to a pronoun creates a formal and respectful tone in reference to a person. This is usually used in referring to politicians, nobles, and priests.

e.g. oba thuma (ඔබ තුමා) – you (vocative, when addressing a minister, high-ranking official, or generally showing respect in public etc.)

ජනාධිපති තුමා
janadhipathi thuma
the president (third person)

=== Discourse ===
Sinhala is a pro-drop language: any arguments of a sentence can be omitted when they can be inferred from context. This is not only true for subject – as in Italian, for instance – but also objects and other parts of the sentence can be "dropped" in Sinhala if they can be inferred. In that sense, Sinhala can be called a "super pro-drop language", like Japanese.

කොහෙද ගියේ
koɦedə ɡie
where went
can mean "where did I/you/he/she/we... go"

== See also ==
- Sinhala honorifics
- Sinhala idioms and proverbs
- Sinhala keyboard
- Sinhala numerals
- Sinhala slang
- Madura English–Sinhala Dictionary
- List of Sinhala words of Tamil origin

== Bibliography ==
- Gair, James: Sinhala and Other South Asian Languages, New York 1998.
- Indrapala, Karthigesu (2007). The evolution of an ethnic identity: The Tamils in Sri Lanka C. 300 BCE to C. 1200 CE. Colombo: Vijitha Yapa. ISBN 978-955-1266-72-1.
- Perera, H.S.; Jones, D. (1919). A colloquial Sinhalese reader in phonetic transcription. Manchester: Longmans, Green & Co.
- Van Driem, George (15 January 2002). Languages of the Himalayas: An Ethnolinguistic Handbook of the Greater Himalayan Region. Brill Academic Publishers. ISBN 978-90-04-10390-0.
- Gair, James W. (2003). "Sinhala". In Cardona, George; Jain, Dhanesh (eds.). The Indo-Aryan Languages. Routledge. pp. 766–817. ISBN 978-0-415-77294-5.
