= List of Sinhala words of Dutch origin =

This is a list of Sinhala words of Dutch origin. Sinhala words of Dutch origin came about during the period of Dutch colonial rule in Sri Lanka between 1658 and 1798. This period saw absorption of several Dutch words into the local language brought about by the interaction between Dutch colonials and the Sinhalese people, mainly in the coastal areas of the island. The Dutch replaced the Portuguese as the catalyst of change with regard to the social and cultural life of the people. A wide variety of words were adopted from administrative terms to military terms, which reveals several points of contact between the two groups.

== Types of loanwords ==
Borrowings

The words pertaining to the fields of daily life, administration, food and military are the most numerous; this is to be expected because of many new innovations and goods that reached Sri Lanka via the Dutch.

== The borrowing process ==
Dutch loanwords in Sinhala rarely appear in the same form as the original word. Usually, a word has undergone some kind of modification to fit into the Sinhala phonological or morphological system (e.g. balk becomes bālkaya because Sinhala inanimate nouns (see grammatical gender) need to end with /a/, [ə], in order to be declineable).

These are the main ways Dutch words are incorporated into the Sinhala lexicon with different endings:

- With an /aya/ or /uva/ added to Dutch words ending in consonants (e.g. raam > rāmuva).
- With a /ya/ added to words ending in /a/ or /e/ or /i/ (e.g. bakje > bakkiya).
- With the animate ending /yā/ added to Dutch words signifying living beings or (e.g. tolk > tōlkayā).
- Initial /s/ preceding a consonant usually forms an additional syllable (e.g. school > iskōlaya).

== Nouns and Adjectives ==
Sinhala	සිංහල	Meaning	Dutch	Meaning	Type
administrāsiya	අද්මිනිස්ත්‍රාසිය	Administration	Administratie	Administration	Administration
advakāt	අද්වකාත්	Lawyer, advocate	Advocaat	Lawyer	Administration
agasti	අගස්ති	Agate	Agate	Agate	Daily
amanda, amandæl	අමන්ද, අමන්දැල්	Almond	Amandel	Almond	Food
ambila	අම්බිල	Anvil	Aambeeld	Anvil	Daily
artāpal	අර්තාපල්	Potato	Aardappel	Potato	Food
æpǣla	ඇපෑල	corporation	Appel	Appeal	Administration
āsiyā	ආසිය	Ace	Aas	Ace	Daily
avagāraya	අවගාරය	Auger	Avegaar	Auger	Construction
bācciya	බාච්චිය	Jacket	Baadje	Jacket	Clothing
bakkiya	බක්කිය	small trough or box	Bakje	Small trough or box	Construction
balansa	බලන්ස	balance	Balans	Balance	Daily
bāliya	බාලිය	Tub	Balie	Tub	Daily
balkona	බල්කොන	balcony	Balkon	Balcony	Construction
bālkaya	බාල්කය	Beam/Rafter	Balk	Beam	Construction
banketa	බන්කෙත	Banquette	Banket	Banquette	Construction
bānsiya	බාන්සිය	Berth	Baantje	Berth	Construction
bās	බාස්	Mason	Baas	Boss, leader	Construction
bavusa	බවුස	Tube	Buis	Tube	Daily
belek	බෙලෙක්	Tin	Blikje	Tin	Daily
beliyata	බෙලියත	Placard, Notice of Sale	Bericht	Notice	Daily
bōkkuva	බෝක්කුව	Arch	Boog	Arch	Daily
bōṁci	බෝංචි	Bean(s)	Boontje	Bean	Food
bōrdaya	බෝර්දය	Border	Boord	Edge, Border	Daily
būdalaya	බූදලය	Estate/Property	Boerderij	Estate	Administration
būndala	බූන්දල	Bundle	Bundel	Bundle	Daily
būruvā	බුරුවා	Jack/Knave	Boer	Farmer	Daily
dāṁ	දාං	Draughts	Dammen	Draughts	Daily
dāsiya	දාසිය	Tie	Das	Tie	Clothing
dǣla	දෑල	Dale	Dal	Dale	Daily
dusima	දුසිම	Dozen	Dozijn	Dozen	Daily
hākkaya	හාක්කය	Hook	Haak	Hook	Daily
hārnāla	හාර්නාල	Hairpin	Haarnaald	Hairpin	Daily
hārata	හාරත	Hearts	Harten	Hearts	Daily
hērā	හේරා	King	Heer	Mister, Sir	Daily
hundā	හුන්දා	Hound	Hond	Dog	Daily
jasa, jæsa	ජස, ජැස	Jacket	Jas	Jacket	Clothing
isnibonchi	ඉස්නිබෝංචි	Green beans	Snijboontjes	Green bean	food
istirikkaya	ඉස්තිරික්කය	Iron	Strijkijzer	Iron	Daily
iskōppa	ඉස්කෝප්ප	Spades	Schoppen	Spades	Daily
istālaya	ඉස්තාලය	Stall, Stable	Stal	Stall	Construction
istōppuva	ඉස්තෝප්පුව	Veranda	Stoep	Side Walk	Construction
kakkussiya	කක්කුස්සිය	Toilet	Kakhuisje	kak "feces" + huisje "small house"	Daily
kalābara	කලාබර	Clubs	Klaveren	Clubs	Daily
kāmaraya	කාමරය	Room	Kamer	Room	Construction
kanāla	කනාල	Canal	Kanaal	Canal	Construction
kantōruva	කන්තෝරුව	Office	Kantoor	Office	Administration
kalukumā	කලුකුමා	Turkey	Kalkoen	Turkey	Food
kanoma	කනොම	Cannon	Kanon	Cannon	Military
kapōti	කපෝති	Broken, exhausted	Kapot	Broken, exhausted	Daily
karāmaya	කරාමය	Tap	Kraan	Tap	Daily
kāsiya	කාසිය	Coin	kwartje	Quarter	Daily
kastan	කස්තන්	Chestnut	kastanje	Chestnut	Daily
kompæniya	කොම්පැනිය	Company	Compagnie	Company	Administration
kārtuva	කාර්තුව	Card	kaartje	Card	Daily
kærakōppuva	කැරකෝප්පුව	Cemetery	Kerkhof	Cemetery	Daily
kētalaya	කේතලය	Kettle	Ketel	Kettle	Food
klavīra	ක්ලාවීර	Piano	Klavier		Daily
klāsiya	ක්ලාසිය	Class	Klasse	Class	Daily
kokis	කොකිස්	Type of fried traditional food	Koekjes	Biscuit	Food
kondēsiya	කොන්දේසිය	Condition	Conditie	Condition	Daily
kōkiyā	කෝකියා	Cook	Kokin	Cook	Daily
kōpi	කෝපි	Coffee	Koffie	Coffee	Daily
kōppaya	කෝප්පය	Cup	Kop	Cup	Daily
koroma	කොරොම	Crown	Kroon	Crown	Daily
kuluna		කුලුන	Colonne	Column	Daily
kuyitansiya	කුයිතන්සිය	Receipt	Kwitantie	Receipt	Administration
lanta	ලන්ත	Land	Land	Land, Country	Administration
lappiya	ලප්පිය	Patch	Lapje	Lap	Clothing
læyin	ලැයින්	Glue	Lijm	Glue	Daily
lavandel	ලවන්දෙල්	Lavender	Lavendel	Lavender	Botanical
leyi leyi	ලෙයි ලෙයි	Mixed	Allerlei	All kinds of	Daily
londa	ලොන්ද	Blond	Blond	Blond	Botanical
lūpa	ලූප	Gun Barrel	Loop	Barrel	Military
mīla	මීල	Meal	Meel	Meal	Daily
miṁci	මිංචි	Mint	Muntje	Mint	Food
nǣla	නෑල	Needle	Naald	Needle	Daily
notāris	නොතාරිස්	Notary	Notaris	Notary	Administration
oralōsuva	ඔරලෝසුව	Clock	Horloge (from French)	Wrist Watch	Daily
panīla	පනීල	Panel	Paneel	Panel	Daily
pelsa	පෙල්ස	Fur	Pels	Fur	Daily
petora	පෙතොර	Cartride	Patroon	Cartridge	Military
piṭasæli	පිටසැලි	Parsley	Peterselie	Parsley	Food
plā	ප්ලා	Custard	Vla	Custard	Food
poroppaya	පොරොප්පය	Cork	Prop, Kurk	Plug, Cork	Daily
porova	පොරොව	Queen	Vrouw	Lady	Daily
proklamāsiya	ප්‍රොක්ලමාසිය	Proclamation	Proclamatie	Proclamation	Administration
pūli	පූලි	Mace	Foelie	Mace	Food
pūsā	පූසා	Cat	Poes	Cat	Animal
puyar	පුයර්	Powder	Poeier	Powder	Daily
rākkaya	රාක්කය	Rack	Rek	Rack	Daily
rāmuva	රාමුව	Frame	Raam	Frame	Daily
rikat	රිකත්	Richard	Rikkert	Richard	Proper Name
ruhita	රුවිත	Diamonds	Ruiten	Diamonds	Daily
sældiri	සැල්දිරි	Celery	Selderij	Celery	Food
sǣdala	සෑදල	Saddle	Zadel	Saddle	Daily
selduk	සෙල්දුක්	Canvas	Zeildoek	Canvas	Daily
sipiri, sipiyā	සිපිරි, සිපියා	Jailer, Warden	Cipier	Jailer	Administration
sōppiya	සෝප්පිය	Shot	Schop	Shot	Daily
tarappuva	තරප්පුව	Stairs	Trap	Stairs	Construction
tēpōcciya	තේපෝච්චිය	Teapot	Theepot	Tea pot	Daily
tintal	තින්තල්	Tinder	Tintel	Tinder	Daily
tisāla	තිසාල	Tile	Tegel	Tile	Daily
testamēntuva	තෙස්තමේන්තුව	Testament	Testament	Testament	Administration
tōlkayā	තෝල්කයා	Interpreter	Tolk	Interpreter	Administration
vāpana	වාපන	Coat of Arms	Wapen	Insignia	Daily
vatal	වතල්	Carrot	Wortel	Carrot	food
vendēsiya	වෙන්දේසිය	Auction	Vendutie	Auction	Administration
vinkala	වින්කල	Workshop	Winkel	Shop	Daily
viyalti	වියල්ති	Violet	Viooltje	Violet	Daily
vul	වුල්	Wool	Wol	Wool	Daily

== Verbs ==
Sinhala	සිංහල	Meaning	Dutch	Meaning
bikel karanavā	බිකෙල් කරනවා	to Engrave	Bickelen	to Engrave
kēvala karanavā	කේවල කරනවා	to Haggle	kibbelen	to Haggle
ployit karanavā	ප්ලෝයිත් කරනවා	to Whistle	Fluiten	to Whistle
taksēru karanavā	තක්සේරු කරනවා	to Appraise	taxeren	to Appraise
tisal gahanavā	තිසල් ගහනවා	to Tile	tegelen	to Tile
tōlka karanavā	තෝල්ක කරනවා	to Interpret	vertolken	To Interpret
trānslāt karanavā	ත්‍රාන්ස්ලාත් කරනවා	to Translate	translateren	To Translate
vendēsi karanavā	වෙන්දේසි කරනවා	to Auction	vendutie	to Auction

== See also ==
- English loanwords in Sinhala
- Portuguese loanwords in Sinhala
- Tamil loanwords in Sinhala
