= Salgado (disambiguation) =

Salgado may refer to:

== Places in Brazil ==
- Salgado, a municipality of Sergipe
- Salgado (micro-region), a division of Pará (see Vigia, Brazil)
- Salgado de São Félix, a municipality of Paraíba

== People ==
- Salgado (name)

== See also ==
- General Salgado, a municipality of São Paulo
- Brazilian cuisine § Popular dishes — Salgadinhos, plural diminutive form of salgado, a popular street food
