= Karaja (singer) =

German dance and pop musician (born 1978)

Ivana Karaja
- Born: 1978 (age 47–48); Berlin, Germany
- Genres: Dance, trance, pop
- Occupations: Model, dancer, television presenter, singer
- Labels: Ministry of Sound, Sony Music, EMI

Ivana Karaja (born 1978, Berlin) is a German dance and pop musician.

Her 2002 single, "She Moves (La La La)", was a major success worldwide. The track peaked at No. on 42 in the UK Singles Chart in October of that year, where she was billed simply as Karaja.

== Discography ==
- "Hurt So Much" (2001)
- "She Moves (La La La)" (2002)
- "What About Us" (2002)
- "Love Me" (2003)
