= Sinhala input methods =

Keyboard layout for the Sinhala language

A screencast showing Sinhala text being entered using the Intelligent Input Bus into Firefox under Linux. As shown in the video, under the Singlish method, to input විකිපීඩියා (Wikipedia), wikipIdiyaa is entered.

Sinhala input methods are ways of writing the Sinhala language, spoken primarily in Sri Lanka, using a computer. Sinhala input methods can be broadly classified into two main groups: ones based on typewriter keyboard layouts, and ones that are meant to be typed on QWERTY keyboards using an input method, known as "Singlish".

== Wijesekara keyboard ==
The Wijesekara keyboard is the standard typewriter keyboard for the Sinhala script. This keyboard layout was first created and approved by the government of Sri Lanka in 1964.

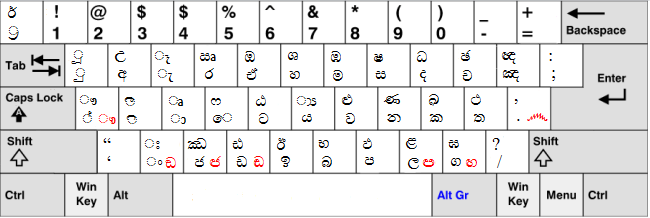
Windows Sinhala layout

In 2004, it was given the SLS standards as the Sri Lanka Sinhala Character Code for Information Interchange, SLS 1134 : 2004.

=== Implementations ===
The first standards compliant Sinhala Keyboard for Apple iOS was created by Bhagya Silva. This implementation featured a copyrighted custom layout that was based on SLS 1134:2004 optimised for mobile keyboards.

=== Virtual Keyboards ===
The first Sinhala virtual keyboard is "Helakuru". Helakuru was developed by Bhasha Lanka (Pvt) Ltd for Android and iOS devices. It was first released on Android in 2011 and in 2015 it was released on App Store also. In 2019, Apple allowed Sinhala to be a keyboard layout and an iPhone language to boost Apple product sales in Sri Lanka. also Every Unicode Converter Support for Sinhala Typing.
