= James Salgado =

Spanish refugee and pamphleteer

- Occupations: Refugee and pamphleteer

James Salgado (fl. 1680) was a Spanish refugee and pamphleteer.

== Biography ==
Salgado was of a good Spanish family, became a Romish priest of the order of the Dominicans. Becoming converted to Protestantism, he suffered much by the inquisition of Spain, and after visiting France, Italy, and the United Netherlands, came to England shortly before 1678. On 26 December 1678 Andrew Sall signed a certificate, dated from Christ Church, Oxford, testifying to his civil behaviour in the university; Sall recommended him for employment in tuition. In his dedication of the ‘Description of the Plaza’ to Charles II Salgado speaks of his pinching poverty. It is possible he left England for Holland before 1684.

Salgado wrote:

- ‘The Romish Priest turn'd Protestant, with the Reasons of his Conversion, wherein the true Church is exposed to the view of Christians and derived out of the Holy Scriptures,’ London, 1679, 4to (dedicated to the lords and commons in parliament).
- ‘A brief Description of the Nature of the Basilisk or Cockatrice’ (anon.) (1680?), 4to.
- ‘Συμβίωσις, or the intimate converse of Pope and Devil attended by a Cardinal and Buffoon. To which is annexed the portrait of each with a brief explication thereof,’ London, 1681 (dedicated to Prince Rupert, duke of Cumberland); Manchester, 1823, 8vo; with ‘An Appendix wherein the Hellish Machinations of the Pope are further searched into on the occasion of the never enough to be lamented death of Sir Edmundbury Godfrey,’ London, 1681.
- ‘An impartial and brief Description of the Plaza or sumptuous Market Place of Madrid and the Bull-baiting there, together with the History of the famous Placidus,’ London, 1683, 4to (dedicated to Charles II); reprinted in ‘Harleian Miscellany,’ vol. vii. 5. ‘Geraldus Lisardo de regimine morali per Jacobum Salgado Hispanum,’ Amsterdam, 1684 (date corrected to 1683).
