= Jamaica Motel =

- Directed by: Aaron J. Salgado
- Written by: Aaron J. Salgado
- Production company: Enlight Films
- Release date: 2006
- Country: United States
- Language: English

Jamaica Motel is a short film produced in 2006 by Enlight Films. The film was written and directed by Aaron J. Salgado.

== Synopsis ==
Jamaica Motel tells a story set in the criminal underworld that exists in Miami's Little Havana. Set during one night, three rooms in this motel consist of: undercover cops executing a prostitution sting, two gang members awaiting the other half of a drug deal, and two cheating lovers. Jamaica Motel tells the story of an undercover cop who catches his cheating wife and her lover in a motel room next door to gun-packing gang members.

== Concept ==
Director Aaron J. Salgado developed the concept for this short film while driving down Calle Ocho. Producing promotional videos for local real estate companies, Salgado put up half of the $10,000 budget. Filming commenced in November 2005, with a 2 day shoot on location in Dania Beach and Miami Beach. Politics and “true to life’ script material would force the duo off Calle Ocho by all motel owners and managers who were contacted for a shooting location. Editing was completed in the Spring of 2006. As Jamaica Motel neared its private crew and press screening, owners of the real Jamaica Motel contacted Enlight Films with a message: “Change the name, or face a lawsuit.”

== Reviews ==
Upon the premiere of Jamaica Motel, the Enlight Films team received glowing reviews from the local media. An excerpt from the Miami Herald reads, “The 10-minute short film serves as a surveillance tape of one night in three consecutive rooms of a motel.” The Miami New Times proclaimed, “a dark and raunchy realm where clandestine adulterers, prostitutes working their johns, and drug dealers on the grind can rent rooms by the hour." A feature piece in "Ocean Drive" reads, “a stylish, gripping mini-movie that brings together the occupants of three separate rooms at the motel.” The short film would go on to be selected as an official entry in the 2006 Miami Short Film Festival. The festival would bring Enlight Films the “Committee Award,” for Jamaica Motel. A Miami Short Film Festival after party hosted by Enlight Films would be featured as part of Channel 7 News’ Deco Drive show.

== Controversy ==
With all the local publicity and success, more controversy was right around the corner. In the fall of 2006, an article about Jamaica Motel and one of the cast members would be written by the ombudsman at PBS, Michael Getler. The article was titled, “A Tale of Two Actresses.” Getler went on to address a situation regarding an actress from Jamaica Motel and one of their shows. Michele Lepe, also known as “Miriam” in the short film, was hired as the host of the “Good Night Show,” which is aimed towards Pre-school children. PBS had a conflict when Lepe’s role in Jamaica Motel was discovered, considering they had fired the previous host for a similar situation. Numerous parental blog sites would be formed across the country regarding Jamaica Motel, Michele Lepe, and PBS. The New York Times eventually ran the story in the Arts section. National coverage would lead film industry agents to contact Enlight Films regarding a feature film version of the short film.
