= Sinhala slang =

Slang of the South Asian language

Sinhala slang is used by speakers of the Sinhala language in Sri Lanka, as well as many other Sinhala-speaking individuals.

== Sinhala dialects ==
Sinhala dialects are the various minor variations of Sinhalese language which are based on the locale (within Island of Sri Lanka) and the social classes and social groups (e.g. university students). Most of the slang are common across all dialects. However certain slang are restricted to certain social classes or groups.

Sinhalese is an Indo-Aryan language and exhibits a marked diglossia between the spoken and written forms. As such, it is also difficult to find instances of colloquial slang in any form of formal literature. Also certain slang (specially sexual slang and swear words) are considered to be so taboo that definitions of those words are not found in any public domain literature. They are not found in any form of media, publications; not even popular websites show them, apart from unmoderated blogs and talk pages. Having said that, most of the non-taboo slang given as examples below are in widespread and frequent use even in popular media - especially in various FM radio channels and popular TV channels.

== Swear words and vulgarities ==
Each dialect and within each dialect; regional, class, age and gender differences would lead to unique slang, vulgarisms, profanities and swear words. Following is a list of potential slang by different categories as of 2007.

Certain slang carry covert prestige and are used only within certain social groups and thus not often understood outside of that group. For example, Āyis Ammā (ආයිස් අම්මා) is a slang term used by certain parts of Sri Lankan society to express pleasurable surprise (similar to wow!). This slang is not picked up by most of the social classes who may regard themselves as "more refined". Instead these people might use Shā (ෂා) to express the same feeling.

Within Sri Lankan universities, diverse slang exists, which is only used and understood by the university students and the alumni. For example Kuppiyə (කුප්පිය) which literally means 'small bottle' or 'small lamp' is used to refer to an informal tuition class conducted by a student, for a small study group free of charge. Within the Army, the term Āti (ආටි) is used to refer to artillery shells so that Āti gahanəvā (ආටි ගහනවා) means shelling. These terms such as Kuppiyə (කුප්පිය) and Āti (ආටි) are mostly not understood outside of the demographic group that uses them.

=== Use of කාරයා (kārəyā) ===
Sinhalese has an all-purpose suffix කාරයා (kārəyā) which when suffixed to a regular noun (which denotes a demographic group, etc.), creates an informal and (sometimes) disrespectful reference to a person of that demographic group. Most native speakers of Sinhalese liberally use this suffix when they chat informally. As an alternative, Manussaya (Mānnusəyaa meaning person) is used on words that cannot be said via karaya. . However they also make great effort to avoid kārəyā when they speak in a formal venue.
e.g.:

- polis-kārəyā (පොලිස්කාරයා) – policeman
- thæpæl-kārəyā (තැපැල්කාරයා) – postman
- mura-kārəyā (මුරකාරයා) - watchman
- æmerikan-kārəyā(ඇමරිකන්කාරයා) - an American person

=== Use of තුමා (thuma) / තුමිය (thumiya) ===
Sinhalese has an all-purpose odd suffix තුමා (thuma) (and තුමිය (thumiya) for females) which when suffixed to a pronoun creates a formal and respectful tone in reference to a person. Most native speakers of Sinhalese rarely use this suffix in conversation due to its nascency.

e.g.:

- Oba-Thuma (ඔබතුමා) – (Formal) yourself (male)
- Oba-Thumiya (ඔබතුමිය) – (Formal) yourself (female)
- Janadhipathi-Thuma / Janadhipathi-Thumiya (ජනාධිපතිතුමා/ජනාධිපතිතුමිය) – The President (male / female forms)

==== Blasphemy ====
Buddhism being the primary religious tradition in Sinhalese culture, blasphemy in the Sinhalese language primarily refers to Buddhism. However, there exists only a very few instances of Sinhalese slang which can be categorised as blasphemy on Buddhism.

Similarly the term "Ganayā" (ගණයා) is blasphemous; it is a very disrespectful reference to a Buddhist monk.

The term "Rahath Unā"(රහත් උනා) can also be treated as blasphemy, due to the fact that the religious term "attaining Arahat (enlightened) state" is used here to mean something non-religious and mundane. The slang "'Rahath Unā'" usually refers to the situation where someone sneaks out from somewhere, without telling anyone. This slang, however is well accepted in the mainstream diglossia, unlike other blasphemy terms discussed above. "Erdhi Unā"(එර්දි උනා) is a similar term which can be treated as blasphemy on the same grounds. The term "(Himin Særē) Māru Unā" ((හිමින් සැරේ) මාරු උනා) gives the same meaning without blasphemy.

=== Equating people with animals ===
For the purpose of swearing (for fun, and as nicknames), it is a common practice in many languages/cultures to equate people with animals; and Sinhalese is no exception. Most languages/cultures have a popular set of such animals references used for this purpose. Each animal represents a particular set of characteristics which can be positive or negative. Referencing people with the word for a "dirty" animal like a pig has negative connotation; likewise, a reference to a strong animal like "lion" has a positive one.

Cow or bull ("Gonā"[ගොනා]/"Harakā"[හරකා]) is an animal reference frequently used in Sinhala. For example, "Gon Vædak" (ගොන් වැඩක්) means a "stupid deed".

=== Taboo sexual slang and euphemisms ===
Most of the sexual slang, euphemisms and sexual innuendo in Sinhalese discourse has a strong male perspective. Irreverence and disrespect is a common trait in sexual slang (due to its very nature of being "sexual"). Some of the slang can be offensive to both genders, but in general, more sexual slang is used to refer to females than males. This type of sexual slang ranges from "mild" to "severe" and sometimes borders the "extreme taboo". It is advisable to avoid slang of this nature in decent company.

=== Sexual profanity ===
Sexual profanity in Sinhalese is regarded highly taboo in Sinhalese speaking society, and are not supposed to be written down in any form, in any venue. These terms are collectively called කුණු හරුප (kuṇu harupa) in Sinhalese which literally means 'dirty/rotten utterings'. It is difficult and nearly impossible to find references to Sinhalese profanity. Definitions of such are not found in any public domain literature in the Internet or outside of Internet, apart from occasional un-moderated talk page or a blog in the internet, or graffiti and scribbles found in public toilets.

== See also ==
- Neologism
