= Ranji Salgado =

Merennage Ranji Pemsiri Salgado (June 16, 1929 – September 7, 2009) was a Sri Lankan born economist and international civil servant. He was a former Assistant Director of the International Monetary Fund (IMF).

== Education ==
Educated at the Royal College, Colombo where he was a Governor’s Scholar, and won the Rajapakse Prize, the Turnour Prize, C. M. Fernando Memorial Prize, the Steward Prize, Makeen Memorial Prize, Senior English Literature Prize and Senior English Essay Prize. Thereafter he studied mathematics at the University of Ceylon winning the Muncherji Framji Khan Prize and graduating with a B.A. First Class Honours degree in Mathematics. Later he read for the Economics Tripos at the University of Cambridge Upper Second degree, in two years and went on to complete his PhD in Economics at Cambridge in 1960. His supervisor at Cambridge was Richard Stone and he was the first Sri Lankan to obtain a PhD from Cambridge in economics.

== Career ==
He joined the Central Bank of Ceylon in 1952 and served for 14 years. During his time at the Central Bank he worked as Economic Advisor, on secondment to the Ministry of Industries, Ministry of Agriculture, and the Department of National Planning. He was also a visiting lecturer in Economics at the newly created Vidyodaya University from 1960-6. In 1966 he left the Central Bank to join the IMF in Washington. Briefly from 1970 to 1971 he served as Additional Secretary Ministry of Planning and Economic Affairs where he made an important contribution to the development of economic policy.

At the IMF he served for 20 years in many capacities. These included work in the South Asia division, the West Asia division, the South Pacific division, Senior Economist in the Asian Department and chief of many divisions, including functioning as Assistant Director.

One his major roles was as Resident Representative of the IMF in South Korea in the late 1960s when the IMF was playing a critical role in the management of the South Korean economy, and making the transition to be one of Asia’s developed economies. He retired from the IMF in 1988. Thereafter he was appointed to head the Presidential Commission on Banking and Finance in Sri Lanka.

== Later life ==
He was the founding director and long-time vice-president (primary layperson) of the Buddhist Vihara in Washington, D.C. He was also involved with the International Buddhist Centre in Wheaton, Maryland. He was a founding member of the Sri Lanka Association in Washington, and he played a key role in the Serendipity Group, an informal group in Washington promoting Sri Lanka-U.S. relations.

== Family ==
Ranji was born to Simon and Muriel Salgado and was the eldest of three sons. In 1958 he married Surangani Amarasuriya, with whom he had a daughter, Ranmali Prashanti Fonseka (née Salgado), and two sons, Ruwan Navindra Salgado and Ranil Manohara Salgado. Ranji's four grandchildren are Prashant Fonseka, Pravin Fonseka, Harini Salgado, and Dilhan Salgado.
