= Sinhala script =

Abugida writing system of Sri Lanka

Sinhalese script සිංහල අක්‍ෂර මාලාව, Siṁhala Akṣara Mālāwa
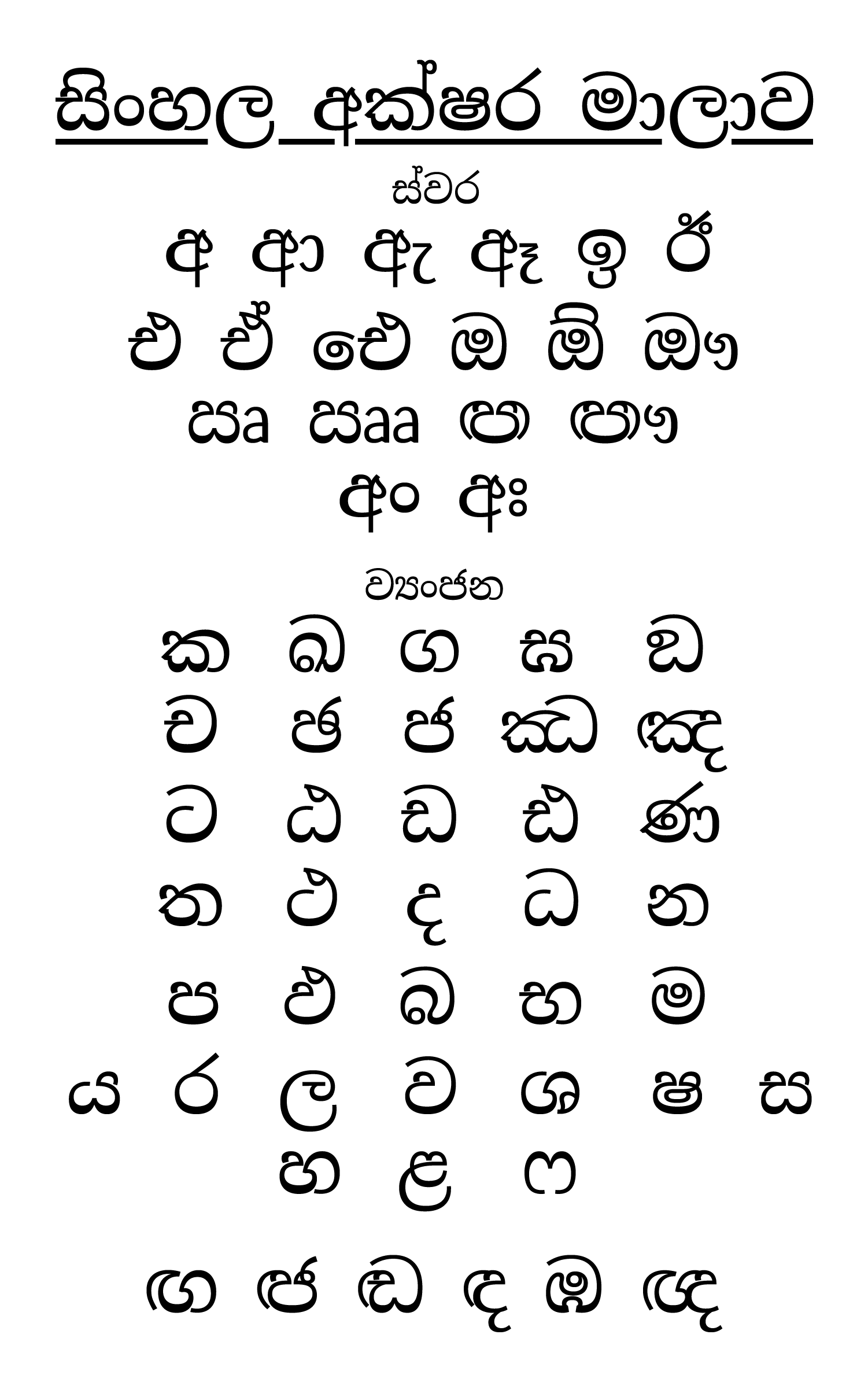
- Siṁhala Akṣara Mālāwa chart
- Script type: Abugida
- Period: 8th century CE – present
- Direction: Left-to-right
- Languages: Sinhalese, Pali, Sanskrit

Related scripts
- Parent systems: Egyptian hieroglyphs: Proto-Sinaitic; Phoenician; Aramaic; Brahmi; Tamili; Pallava; Grantha; Sinhalese script

ISO 15924
- ISO 15924: Sinh (348), Sinhala

Unicode
- Unicode alias: Sinhala
- Unicode range: U+0D80–U+0DFF Sinhala; U+111E0–U+111FF Sinhala Archaic Numbers

The Sinhalese script (Sinhala: සිංහල අක්‍ෂර මාලාව, romanized: Siṁhala Akṣara Mālāwa), also known as Sinhala script, is a writing system used by the Sinhalese people and most Sri Lankans in Sri Lanka and elsewhere to write the Sinhalese language as well as the liturgical languages Pali and Sanskrit. The Sinhalese Akṣara Mālāva, one of the Brahmic scripts, is a descendant of the Ancient Indian Brahmi script. It is thought to be derived from Grantha script.

== History ==
The Sinhala script is a Brahmi derivate and was thought to have been imported from Northern India around the 3rd century BCE. It developed in a complex manner, partly independently but also strongly influenced by South Indian scripts at various stages, manifestly influenced by the early Grantha script. Pottery from the 6th century BCE has been found in Anuradhapura with lithic Brahmi inscriptions written in Helu Prakrit. It has caused debate as to whether Ceylonese Brahmi influenced Brahmi in the Indian mainland.

Medieval Sinhalese, which emerged around 750 AD, is thought to be derived from Grantha script. Although, it has to be noted that between the Proto-Sinhalese and the Medieval Sinhalese that the found inscriptions are radically different, thus, it looks like a break. However, according to the author Diringer a new script which has been derived from the Grantha script "was also later employed for official inscriptions". Subsequently, Medieval (and modern) Sinhalese resemble the South Indian scripts. The earliest surviving literature is from the 9th century CE, by this time around the script became more prevalent and was used in other contexts as well. For instance, the Buddhist literature of the Theravada-Buddhists of Sri Lanka, written in Pali, used Sinhala script.

Modern Sinhalese emerged in the 13th century and is marked by the composition of the grammar book Sidat Sangara. In 1736, the Dutch were the first to print with Sinhala type on the island. The resulting type followed the features of the native Sinhala script used on palm leaves. The type created by the Dutch was monolinear and geometric in fashion, with no separation between words in early documents. During the second half of the 19th century, during the colonial period, a new style of Sinhala letterforms emerged in opposition to the monolinear and geometric form that used high contrast and had varied thicknesses. This high contrast type gradually replaced the monolinear type as the preferred style and continues to be used in the present day. The high contrast style is still preferred for text typesetting in printed newspapers, books, and magazines in Sri Lanka.

Today, the alphabet is used by over 16 million people to write Sinhala in very diverse contexts, such as newspapers, TV commercials, government announcements, graffiti, and schoolbooks.

Sinhala is the main language written in this script, but rare instances of its use for writing Sri Lanka Malay have been recorded.

== Structure ==
The basic form of the letter k is ක "ka". For "ki", a small arch called ispilla is placed over the ක: කි. This replaces the inherent /a/ by /i/. It is also possible to have no vowel following a consonant. In order to produce such a pure consonant, a special marker, the hal kirīma has to be added: ක්. This marker suppresses the inherent vowel.

Sinhala script is an abugida written from left to right. It uses consonants as the basic unit for word construction as each consonant has an inherent vowel (/a/), which can be changed with a different vowel stroke. To represent different sounds it is necessary to add vowel strokes, or diacritics called පිලි (Pili), that can be used before, after, above, or below the base-consonant. Most of the Sinhala letters are curlicues; straight lines are almost completely absent from the alphabet, and it does not have joining characters. This is because Sinhala used to be written on dried palm leaves, which would split along the veins on writing straight lines. This was undesirable, and therefore, the round shapes were preferred. Upper and lower cases do not exist in Sinhala.

Sinhala letters are ordered into two sets. The core set of letters forms the pure Sinhala (Sinhala: ශුද්ධ සිංහල, romanized: śuddha siṃhala) alphabet, which is a subset of the mixed Sinhala (Sinhala: මිශ්‍ර සිංහල, romanized: miśra siṃhala) alphabet. The definition of the two sets is thus a historic one. The śuddha alphabet, also called the Eḷu alphabet (Sinhala: එළු හෝඩිය, romanized: Eḷu hōdiya), contains everything necessary to write Eḷu, or classical Sinhala, as described in the classical grammar Sidatsan̆garā (1300 AD). The śuddha alphabet is also a good representation of the phoneme inventory of present-day colloquial Sinhala; all native sounds of the Modern Sinhala can be represented by śuddha. The śuddha also includes the letters and diacritics for the retroflex consonants ⟨ḷ⟩ and ⟨ṇ⟩, which are not phonemic in modern Sinhala but are needed for the representation of Eḷu. However, words which historically contained these two phonemes are still often written with these letters, despite changes in pronunciation.

The miśra siṃhala alphabet includes letters for Middle Indic aspirate, retroflex and sibilant consonants which are not found in modern Sinhala, but are used in the transcription of are used for transcribing loanwords from Sanskrit (tatsama), Pali or English. Although modern Sinhala sounds are not aspirated, aspiration is marked in the sound where it was historically present, to highlight the differences in modern spelling. The use of miśra siṃhala letters is mainly a question of prestige. From a purely phonemic point of view, their sounds can all be represented by śuddha letters.

Although most phonemes of Sinhala can be represented by a śuddha letter or by a miśra letter, normally only one of them is considered correct. Additionally, the śuddha set itself contains both ⟨ḷ⟩ and ⟨l⟩, as well as ⟨ṇ⟩ and ⟨n⟩, and neither pair is distinctive in Modern sinhala. This one-to-many mapping of phonemes onto graphemes is a frequent source of misspellings.

While a phoneme can be represented by more than one grapheme, each grapheme can be pronounced in only one way, with the exceptions of the inherent vowel sound, which can be either [a] (stressed) or [ə] (unstressed), and "ව" where the consonant is either [v] or [w] depending on the word. This means that the actual pronunciation of a word is almost always clear from its spelling. Stress is almost always predictable; only words with [v] or [w] (which are both allophones of "ව"), and a very few other words need to be learnt individually.

=== Consonants ===
The śuddha alphabet includes eight plosives, two fricatives, two affricates, two nasals, two liquids and two glides. As in other Brahmic scripts, each consonant carries an inherent vowel, which in Sinhala is /a/.

Śuddha and miśra consonants (Note: Letters in black belong to the śuddha set, while letters in pink belong to the miśra set.)
	Unvoiced		Voiced		Nasal	Approximant	Sibilant	Fricative	Other
	Inaspirate	Aspirated	Inaspirate	Aspirate	Nasal	Approximant	Sibilant	Fricative	Other
velar	ක ka IPA: [ka] śuddha	ඛ kha IPA: [ka] miśra	ග ga IPA: [ga] śuddha	ඝ gha IPA: [ga] miśra	ඞ ṅa IPA: [ŋa] miśra			හ ha IPA: [ɦa] śuddha	
palatal	ච ca IPA: [tʃa] śuddha (Note: The voiceless affricate (ච [t͡ʃa]) is not included in the śuddha set by purists since it does not occur in the main text of the Sidatsan̆garā. The Sidatsan̆garā does use it in examples though, so this sound did exist in Eḷu. In any case, it is needed for the representation of modern Sinhala.)	ඡ cha IPA: [tʃa] miśra	ජ ja IPA: [dʒa] śuddha	ඣ jha IPA: [dʒa] miśra	ඤ ñ IPA: [ɲa] miśra	ය ya IPA: [ja] śuddha	ශ śa IPA: [ʃa] miśra		ඥ jña IPA: [d͡ʒɲa] miśra
retroflex	ට ṭa IPA: [ʈa] śuddha	ඨ ṭha IPA: [ʈa] miśra	ඩ ḍa IPA: [ɖa] śuddha	ඪ ḍha IPA: [ɖa] miśra	ණ ṇa IPA: [ɳa] śuddha (Note: The retroflex sounds /ɭ/ and /ɳ/, are no longer phonemic in modern Sinhala, but the letters ⟨ළ⟩ and ⟨ණ⟩ are still included in the śuddha set. Retroflex pronunciations can be found in historic speech.)	ර ra IPA: [ra] śuddha	ෂ ṣa IPA: [ʃa] miśra		ළ ḷa IPA: [ɭa] śuddha
dental	ත ta IPA: [ta] śuddha	ථ tha IPA: [ta] miśra	ද da IPA: [da] śuddha	ධ dha IPA: [da] miśra	න na IPA: [na] śuddha	ල la IPA: [la] śuddha	ස sa IPA: [sa] śuddha		
labial	ප pa IPA: [pa] śuddha	ඵ pha IPA: [pa] miśra	බ ba IPA: [ba] śuddha	භ bha IPA: [ba] miśra	ම ma IPA: [ma] śuddha	ව va/wa IPA: [ʋa] śuddha		ෆ fa IPA: [f] miśra	

==== Prenasalization ====
The prenasalized consonants resemble their plain counterparts. ⟨ඹ⟩, m̆ba is made up of the left half of ⟨ම⟩ ma and the right half of ⟨බ⟩ ba, while the other three are just like the grapheme for the plosive with a little stroke added. Vowel diacritics attach to a prenasalised consonant in the same way as they would to the corresponding plain plosives.

Prenasalized consonants (Note: Letters in black belong to the śuddha set, while letters in pink belong to the miśra set.)
ඟ n̆ga IPA: [ᵑɡa] śuddha	ඦ n̆ja IPA: [ⁿd͡ʒa] miśra (Note: This letter is not used anywhere, neither in modern nor ancient Sinhala. Its usefulness is unclear, but it forms part of the standard alphabet.)	ඬ n̆ḍa IPA: [ᶯɖa] śuddha	ඳ n̆da IPA: [ⁿd̪a] śuddha	ඹ m̆ba IPA: [ᵐba] śuddha

==== Consonant conjuncts ====
The glyph for śrī, which is composed of the letter ś with a ligature indicating the r below and the vowel ī marked above.

Certain combinations of letters are written with ligatures. Some graphical conventions include a ⟨ර⟩ ra following a consonant represented by an inverted arch ⟨◌්‍ර⟩ (rakāransaya), a ⟨ර⟩ r preceding a consonant by a loop above ⟨ර්‍◌⟩ (rēpaya), and a ⟨ය⟩, ya following a consonant as a half of a ya ⟨්‍ය⟩ on the right (yansaya). Some very frequent combinations can be written in one stroke, like ⟨ද්‍ධ⟩, ddha, ⟨ක්‍ව⟩, kwa or ⟨ක්‍ෂ⟩, kś.

Touching letters were used in ancient scriptures but are not used in modern Sinhala. Vowels may be attached to any of the ligatures formed, attaching to the rightmost part of the glyph except for vowels that use the kombuva, where the kombuva is written before the ligature or cluster and the remainder of the vowel, if any, is attached to the rightmost part.

Examples of combined letters
ක්ය ක්‍ය IPA: /kja/ yansaya	ක්යො ක‍්‍යො IPA: /kjo/ yansaya	ග්ය ග්‍ය IPA: /ɡja/ yansaya	ක්ර ක්‍ර IPA: /kra/ rakāransaya	ග්ර ග්‍ර IPA: /ɡra/ rakāransaya	ක්ය්ර ක්‍ය්‍ර IPA: /kjra/ yansaya + rakāransaya
ග්ය්ර ග්‍ය්‍ර IPA: /ɡjra/ yansaya + rakāransaya	ර්ක ර්‍ක IPA: /rka/ rēpaya	ර්ග ර්‍ග IPA: /rɡa/ rēpaya	ර්ක්ය ර්‍ක්‍ය IPA: /rkja/ rēpaya + yansaya	ර්ග්ය ර්‍ග්‍ය IPA: /rɡja/ rēpaya + yansaya	
ක්ව ක්‍ව IPA: /kwa/ conjunct	ක්ෂ ක්‍ෂ IPA: /kʃa/ conjunct	ග්ධ ග්‍ධ IPA: /ɡdᵊa/ conjunct	ට්ඨ ට්‍ඨ IPA: /ʈʈᵊa/ conjunct	ත්ථ ත්‍ථ IPA: /t̪t̪ᵊa/ conjunct	ත්ව ත්‍ව IPA: /t̪wa/ conjunct
ද්ධ ද්‍ධ IPA: /d̪d̪ᵊa/ conjunct	ද්ව ද්‍ව IPA: /d̪wa/ conjunct	න්ද න්‍ද IPA: /nd̪a/ conjunct	න්ධ න්‍ධ IPA: /nd̪ᵊa/ conjunct	ම්ම ම‍්ම IPA: /mma/ touching	

== Vowels and diacritics ==
The two shapes of the hal kirīma, seen here in a ⟨ප්⟩, p (left) and a ⟨බ්⟩, b right. The first shape is the most common one, while the second is used for letters ending at the top left corner.

Each vowel has two forms, an independent and a diacritic or vowel stroke (Sinhala: පිලි, romanized: pili). The independent form is used when a vowel occurs at the beginning of a word. The diacritic is used when a vowel follows a consonant.

While most diacritics are regular, ⟨ ු⟩, u and ⟨ ූ⟩ ū take on a different shape when attached to a ⟨ක⟩, ka, ⟨ග⟩, ga, ⟨ඟ⟩, n̆ga, ⟨ත⟩, ta, ⟨භ⟩, bha, or ⟨ශ⟩, śa. E.g.: ⟨කු⟩, ku, ⟨කූ⟩, kū.

The inherent vowel of a letter can be removed by a hal kirīma (◌්), which has two shapes depending on which consonant it attaches to.

Combinations of ර(r) or ළ(ḷ) with ⟨u⟩ have idiosyncratic shapes, viz රු (ru), රූ (rū), ළු (ḷu) and ළූ (ḷū). The diacritic used for රු (ru) and රූ (rū) is what is normally used for the ⟨æ⟩, and therefore there are idiosyncratic forms for ræ and rǣ, viz රැ and රෑ.

=== Śuddha vowels ===
There are six long and six short śuddha vowels.

Śuddha short vowels, hal kirīma, and examples with ⟨ක⟩, ka and ⟨බ⟩, ba.
අ◌ a IPA: [a], [ə] (Note: Since every unmarked consonant carries an inherent a vowel, there is no need for a diacritic form of ⟨අ⟩).	ඇැ æ IPA: [æ]	ඉි i IPA: [i]	උු u IPA: [u]	එෙ e IPA: [e]	ඔො o IPA: [o]	◌◌් hal kirīma (Note: The hal kirīma has no independent form as it is always attached to a consonant.)
ක ka IPA: [ka], [kə]	කැ kæ IPA: [kæ]	කි ki IPA: [ki]	කු ku IPA: [ku]	කෙ ke IPA: [ke]	කො ko IPA: [ko]	ක් k IPA: [k]
බ ba IPA: [ba], [bə]	බැ bæ IPA: [bæ]	බි bi IPA: [bi]	බු bu IPA: [bu]	බෙ be IPA: [be]	බො bo IPA: [bo]	බ් b IPA: [b]

Śuddha long vowels and examples with ⟨ක⟩, ka and ⟨බ⟩, ba.
ආා ā IPA: [aː]	ඈෑ ǣ IPA: [æː]	ඊී ī IPA: [iː]	ඌූ ū IPA: [uː]	ඒේ ē IPA: [eː]	ඕෝ ō IPA: [oː]
කා kā IPA: [kaː]	කෑ kǣ IPA: [kæː]	කී kī IPA: [kiː]	කූ kū IPA: [kuː]	කේ kē IPA: [keː]	කෝ kō IPA: [koː]
බා bā IPA: [baː]	බෑ bǣ IPA: [bæː]	බී bī IPA: [biː]	බූ bū IPA: [buː]	බේ bē IPA: [beː]	බෝ bō IPA: [boː]

=== Miśra vowels and vocalics ===
There are six additional vowel and syllabic consonants in the miśra alphabet. The two diphthongs are quite common, while the vocalic ṛ is much rarer, and ḷ is all but obsolete. The latter two are almost exclusively found in loanwords from Sanskrit.

The miśra ⟨ṛ⟩ can also be written with śuddha ⟨r⟩+⟨u⟩ or ⟨u⟩+⟨r⟩, which corresponds to the actual pronunciation. The miśra syllabic ḷ can be replaced by śuddha ⟨l⟩+⟨i⟩. Miśra ⟨au⟩ is rendered as śuddha ⟨awu⟩, miśra ⟨ai⟩ as śuddha ⟨ayi⟩.

Miśra vowels and vocalics, and examples with ⟨ක⟩
ඍෘ r̥ IPA: [ru]	ඎෲ r̥̄ IPA: [ruː]	ඓෛ ai IPA: [aj]	ඖෞ au IPA: [au]	ඏෟ l̥ IPA: [li]	ඐෳ l̥̄ IPA: [liː]
කෘ kru IPA: [kru]	කෲ krū IPA: [kruː]	කෛ kai IPA: [kaj]	කෞ kau IPA: [kau]	කෟ kl̥ IPA: [kli] (Note: Mainly used in conjunction with another diacritic, ⟨ෙ⟩)	කෳ kl̥̄ IPA: [kliː] (Note: Not in contemporary use.)

=== Other diacritics ===
The anusvara (often called binduva 'zero') is represented by one small circle ⟨◌ං⟩, and the visarga (technically part of the miśra alphabet) by two ⟨◌ඃ⟩.

== Letter names ==
The Sinhala śuddha graphemes are named in a uniform way adding -yanna to the sound produced by the letter, including vocalic diacritics. The name for the letter අ is thus ayanna, for the letter ආ āyanna, for the letter ක kayanna, for the letter කා kāyanna, for the letter කෙ keyanna and so forth. For letters with hal kirīma, an epenthetic a is added for easier pronunciation: the name for the letter ක් is akyanna. Another naming convention is to use al- before a letter with suppressed vowel, thus alkayanna.

Since the extra miśra letters are phonetically not distinguishable from the śuddha letters, proceeding in the same way would lead to confusion. Names of miśra letters are normally made up of the names of two śuddha letters pronounced as one word. The first one indicates the sound, the second one the shape. For example, the aspirated ඛ (kh) is called bayanu kayanna. kayanna indicates the sound, while bayanu indicates the shape: ඛ (kh) is similar in shape to බ (b) (bayunu = like bayanna). Another method is to qualify the miśra aspirates by mahāprāna (ඛ: mahāprāna kayanna) and the miśra retroflexes by mūrdhaja (ළ: mūrdhaja layanna).

== Numerals ==
Sinhala had its numerals (Sinhala illakkam), which were used from prior to the fall of Kandyan Kingdom in 1815. They can be seen primarily in Royal documents and artefacts. Sinhala Illakkam did not have a zero, but did have signs for 10, 20, 30, 40, 50, 60, 70, 80, 90, 100, 1000.

This system has been replaced by the Hindu–Arabic numeral system.

Sinhala illakkam
𑇡 1	𑇢 2	𑇣 3	𑇤 4	𑇥 5	𑇦 6	𑇧 7	𑇨 8	𑇩 9	𑇪 10
𑇫 20	𑇬 30	𑇭 40	𑇮 50	𑇯 60	𑇰 70	𑇱 80	𑇲 90	𑇳 100	𑇴 1000

=== Astrological numbers ===
Prior to the fall of Kandyan Kingdom all calculations were carried out using Sinhala lith illakkam. After that event, Sinhala lith illakkam became known as or Sinhala astrological number and were primarily used for writing horoscopes. The tradition of writing degrees and minutes of zodiac signs in lith numbers continued into the 20th century. Unlike the Sinhala illakkam, Sinhala lith illakkam included a 0.

Sinhala lith illakkam
෦ 0	෧ 1	෨ 2	෩ 3	෪ 4	෫ 5	෬ 6	෭ 7	෮ 8	෯ 9

෴
kunddaliya

Neither the Sinhala numerals nor the Sinhala punctuation mark kunddaliya is in general use today, but some use it in social media, Internet messaging and blogs. The kunddaliya was formerly used as a full stop.

== Transliteration ==
Sinhala transliteration (Sinhala: රෝම අකුරින් ලිවීම rōma akurin liwīma, literally "Roman letter writing") can be done in analogy to Devanāgarī transliteration.

Layman's transliterations in Sri Lanka normally follow neither of these. Vowels are transliterated according to English spelling equivalences, which can yield a variety of spellings for a number of phonemes. /iː/ for instance can be ⟨ee⟩, ⟨e⟩, ⟨ea⟩, ⟨i⟩, etc. A transliteration pattern peculiar to Sinhala, and facilitated by the absence of phonemic aspirates, is the use of ⟨th⟩ for the voiceless dental plosive, and the use of ⟨t⟩ for the voiceless retroflex plosive. This is presumably because the retroflex plosive /ʈ/ is perceived the same as the English alveolar plosive /t/, and the Sinhala dental plosive /t̪/ is equated with the English voiceless dental fricative /θ/. Dental and retroflex voiced plosives are always rendered as ⟨d⟩, though, presumably because ⟨dh⟩ is not found as a representation of /ð/ in English orthography.

== Use for the Pali language ==
Many of the oldest Pali manuscript are written in the Sinhala script. The first instance of the Pali Tripitaka being written down sometime from 29 to 17 BCE occurred in Sri Lanka. At the time, these would have been written in what was still Brahmi script but adapted to palm leaves. Successive copies of Buddhist texts follow the evolution of that version of Brahmi on the island, leading to modern Sinhala.

Many of the miśra consonants are used to represent Pali phonemes that have no Sinhala counterpart, particularly the aspirated consonants. On the other hand, not all śuddha set consonants are used; the prenasalised consonants have no counterpart in Pali phonology, and so are not used. Consonant sequences may be combined in ligatures the same way as in Sinhala.

The vowels are a subset of those for writing Sinhala, comprising long and short a, i, and u, short e and short o.

The niggahīta is represented with the sign ං.

As an example, below is the first verse from the Pali Dhammapada in Sinhala script, along with the corresponding romanization.

මනොපුබ්‌බඞ්‌ගමා ධම්‌මා, මනොසෙට්‌ඨා මනොමයා;
Manopubbaṅgamā dhammā, manoseṭṭhā manomayā;

මනසා චෙ පදුට්‌ඨෙන, භාසති වා කරොති වා;
manasā ce paduṭṭhena bhāsati vā karoti vā;

තතො නං දුක්‌ඛමන්‌වෙති, චක්‌කංව වහතො පදං.
tato naṁ dukkhamanveti cakkaṁva vahato padaṁ.

— Yamaka-vaggo 1

== Relation to other scripts ==
Similarities

Sinhala is one of the Brahmic scripts, and thus shares many similarities with other members of the family, such as Grantha, Kannada, Malayalam, Telugu, Tamil script and Devanāgarī. As a general example, /a/ is the inherent vowel in all these scripts (except Devanagari, where it is /ə/). Other similarities include the diacritic for ⟨ai⟩, which resembles a doubled ⟨e⟩ in all scripts and the diacritic for ⟨au⟩ which is composed of preceding ⟨e⟩ and following ⟨ḷ⟩.

Likewise, the combination of the diacritics for ⟨e⟩ and ⟨ā⟩ yields ⟨o⟩ in all these scripts.

Comparison of independent and diacritic vowels
Script	e	ai	au	ā	o
Sinhala	එෙ	ඓෛ	ඖෞ	ආා	ඔො
Tamil Grantha	𑌏𑍇	𑌐𑍈	𑌔𑍌	𑌆𑌾	𑌓𑍋
Malayalam	എെ	ഐൈ	ഔൗ	ആാ	ഒൊ
Tamil	எ◌ெ	ஐ◌ை◌	ஔ◌ௌ	ஆ◌ா	ஒொ
Bengali	এে	ঐৈ	ঔৌ	আা	ওো
Odia	ଏ◌େ	ଐୈ	ଔ◌ୌ	ଆ◌ା	ଓୋ
Dēvanāgarī	ए◌े	ऐ◌ै	औ◌ौ	आ◌ा	ओ◌ो

Differences

Sinhala alphabet differs from other Indo-Aryan alphabets in that it contains a pair of vowel sounds (U+0DD0 and U+0DD1 in the proposed Unicode Standard) that are unique to it. These are the two vowel sounds that are similar to the two vowel sounds that occur at the beginning of the English words at (ඇ) and ant (ඈ).

== Computer encoding ==
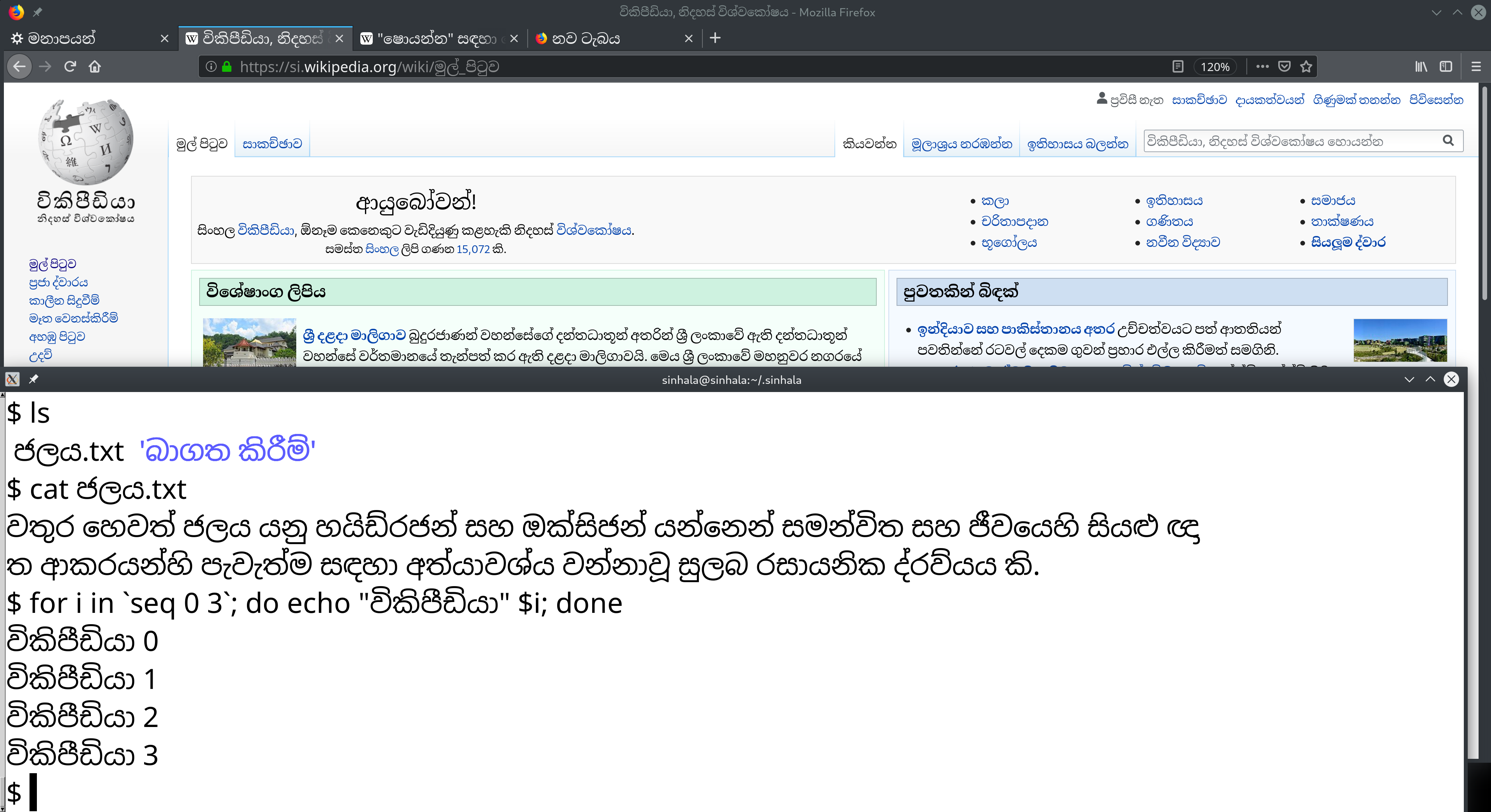
Sinhala language support in Linux. Firefox is shown in the background, with mlterm in the foreground with text having been entered into it by ibus-m17n.

Generally speaking, Sinhala support is less developed than support for Devanāgarī, for instance. A recurring problem is the rendering of diacritics which precede the consonant and diacritic signs which come in different shapes, like the one for ⟨u⟩.

Sinhala support did not come built in with Microsoft Windows XP, unlike Tamil and Hindi, but was supported by third-party means such as Keyman by SIL International. Thereafter, all versions of Windows Vista and above, including Windows 10 come with Sinhala support by default, and do not require external fonts to be installed to read Sinhala script. Nirmala UI is the default Sinhala font in Windows 10. The latest versions of Windows 10 have added support for Sinhala Archaic Numbers that were not supported by default in previous versions.

For macOS, Apple Inc. has provided Sinhala font support for versions of macOS that are Catalina and above through Unicode integration. Keyboard support is available by third-party means such as Helakuru and Keyman. In Mac OS X, Sinhala font and keyboard support were provided by Nickshanks and Xenotypetech.

For Linux, the IBus, and SCIM input methods allow the use Sinhala script in applications with support for a number of key maps and techniques such as traditional, phonetic and assisted techniques. In addition, newer versions of the Android mobile operating system also support both rendering and input of Sinhala script by default and applications like Helakuru serve as dedicated keyboard integrators.

=== Unicode ===
Sinhala script was added to the Unicode Standard in September 1999 with the release of version 3.0. This character allocation has been adopted in Sri Lanka as the Standard SLS1134.

The main Unicode block for Sinhala is U+0D80–U+0DFF. Another block, Sinhala Archaic Numbers, was added to Unicode in version 7.0.0 in June 2014. Its range is U+111E0–U+111FF.

Sinhala^{[1]}^{[2]} Official Unicode Consortium code chart (PDF)
	0	1	2	3	4	5	6	7	8	9	A	B	C	D	E	F
U+0D8x		ඁ	ං	ඃ		අ	ආ	ඇ	ඈ	ඉ	ඊ	උ	ඌ	ඍ	ඎ	ඏ
U+0D9x	ඐ	එ	ඒ	ඓ	ඔ	ඕ	ඖ				ක	ඛ	ග	ඝ	ඞ	ඟ
U+0DAx	ච	ඡ	ජ	ඣ	ඤ	ඥ	ඦ	ට	ඨ	ඩ	ඪ	ණ	ඬ	ත	ථ	ද
U+0DBx	ධ	න		ඳ	ප	ඵ	බ	භ	ම	ඹ	ය	ර		ල		
U+0DCx	ව	ශ	ෂ	ස	හ	ළ	ෆ				්					ා
U+0DDx	ැ	ෑ	ි	ී	ු		ූ		ෘ	ෙ	ේ	ෛ	ො	ෝ	ෞ	ෟ
U+0DEx							෦	෧	෨	෩	෪	෫	෬	෭	෮	෯
U+0DFx			ෲ	ෳ	෴											
Notes 1.As of Unicode version 18.0 2.Grey areas indicate non-assigned code points

Sinhala Archaic Numbers^{[1]}^{[2]} Official Unicode Consortium code chart (PDF)
	0	1	2	3	4	5	6	7	8	9	A	B	C	D	E	F
U+111Ex		𑇡	𑇢	𑇣	𑇤	𑇥	𑇦	𑇧	𑇨	𑇩	𑇪	𑇫	𑇬	𑇭	𑇮	𑇯
U+111Fx	𑇰	𑇱	𑇲	𑇳	𑇴											
Notes 1.As of Unicode version 18.0 2.Grey areas indicate non-assigned code points

== See also ==
- Sinhala Braille
- History of Sinhala software
- Loanwords
  - Dutch loanwords in Sinhala
  - English loanwords in Sinhala
  - Portuguese loanwords in Sinhala
  - Tamil loanwords in Sinhala
