= History of Sinhala software =

Sinhala language software for computers have been present since the late 1980s (Samanala written in C) but no standard character representation system was put in place which resulted in proprietary character representation systems and fonts. In the wake of this CINTEC (Computer and Information Technology Council of Sri Lanka) introduced Sinhala within the UNICODE (16‑bit character technology) standard. ICTA concluded the work started by CINTEC for approving and standardizing Sinhala Unicode in Sri Lanka.

== Timeline ==
=== 1980–1989 ===
1985

- CINTEC establishes a committee for the use of Sinhala & Tamil in Computer Technology.

1987

- "DOS WordPerfect" Reverend Gangodawila Soma Thero, who was the chief incumbent at the Springvale Buddhist temple in Melbourne, Australia asked the Lay members of the temple to produce a Monthly Newsletter for the temple in Sinhala, called "Bodu Puwath". A lay person named Jayantha de Silva developed two HP PCL Sinhala fonts called Lihil and an intelligent Phonetic keyboard that was able to select letters based on context, together with a printer driver and screen fonts. All this was possible because the utilities to create the keyboard and printer driver were supplied with WordPerfect. It was easy to use and was installed in many PCs owned by lay members and in the temple PC for typing articles. The program fell into disuse after Windows came online in 1990 as it did not support the WordPerfect macro keyboard.

1988/1989

- "Super77" First trilingual word processor (DOS based) initially developed at "Super Bits Computer Systems", Katunayake and further improved up to the commercial level at IFS kandy (by Rohan Manamudali & Sampath Godamunne, under Prof. Cyril Ponnamperuma). Later it was named as "THIBUS Trilingual Software System" (Windows based).

1989

- "WadanTharuwa" (means WordStar in Sinhala) developed by the University of Colombo. It was one of the first commercial Sinhala word processing software products. Gives inspiration to a new generation of developers to pursue further innovation in this field.

=== 1990–1999 ===
1992

- True Type Font Set KANDY jointly developed by Niranjan Meegammana and Micheal Gruber as part of project work (German Sri Lankan Co-Operation programme, 1988–1996) to use Sinhala Language in digital navigation charts.

1995

- Sarasavi, also developed by the University of Colombo is a new version of WadanTharuwa, the first Trilingual software of its kind.
- Thibus for Windows developed by Science Land (Pvt) Ltd. The most successful commercial software. Also includes the first Sinhala/English/Tamil dictionary and word by word translation technology.
- Niranjan Meegammana continuing his work introduced New Kandy and several other windows fonts with Sinhala Word, one of the first Sinhala and Tamil word processors.

1996

- Sri Lanka CD, A Sinhala Encyclopedia like CD on Sri Lanka developed by Niranjan Meegammana using New Kandy fonts.

1997

- Helewadana for Windows developed by Microimage (Pvt) Ltd and Harsha Punasinghe. The most notable competition to Thibus during that time. Provides almost every functionality provided in Thibus.
- Lankdeepa and Virakesari News papers published online by Niranjan Meegammana using Kandy New and Jaffna fonts. Greatly appreciated by Sri Lankan world over as Sinhala Content and communications on internet started with this initiative by ISP Ceycom Global Communications Ltd.

1998

- Sinhala Word developed by Niranjan Meegamanna and becomes popular among the internet users and the font aKandyNew becomes the web standard font. The software supports both Phonetic and Wijesekara keyboards.
- SLS1134/Unicode standards released by CINTEC for the first time.

=== 2000–2009 ===
2000

- Thibus Dictionary – Sri Lanka’s First Digital Word Translator The Thibus Sinhala-English Dictionary, developed by Rohan Manamudali and the original Thibus software team, was released in 2000 and is considered Sri Lanka’s first digital bilingual dictionary (Later, Tamil was added, making it the first trilingual digital dictionary in Sri Lanka) .

It provided Sinhala–English and English–Sinhala word translation in an interactive, Windows-based desktop application. Widely used in education and administration, it was part of a broader initiative that followed the 1989 release of the Thibus Trilingual Word Processor (Dos-based and Windows-based in 2005).

2000

- http://www.kaputa.com introduced by Niranjan Meegammana at e fusion pvt ltd. using Kaputa true type font which superseded Kandy New on web content and email communications opened up a new era of Sinhala content with mass content published by kaputa.com.
- Thibus and Helawadana release the new versions of their successful products. The new versions have the transliteration technology built in. (Very primitive stages of transliteration.)

2002

- Madura English-Sinhala Dictionary developed by Madura Kulatunga is released. The dictionary software is distributed as freeware. However the dictionary database is originally developed and owned by Thibus.
- Siyabasa Sinhala Typing software developed by Dineth Chathuranga is released. This one single program is compatible and works with Windows 98 to Windows 7 operating systems.

2002-2004

- Sinhala Text Box developed by Dasith Wijesiriwardena, a lightweight word processor which supports publishing web pages to the internet and supports almost all the existing Fonts and Keyboards. Has built in support for transliteration keyboard input in most fonts. One of the major draw backs being the lack of support for Unicode. Wins best software awards at CSITTS (Peradeniya University) 2003 and in Digital Fusion (APIIT) 2004.
- Tusitha Randunuge and Niranjan Meegammana at e fusion pvt ltd, released Kaputa dot com 2004 font with improved mapping for web content.
- Lanka Linux User Group (LKLUG) introduces Sinhala Unicode in Linux.
- The "Iskoola Pota" Unicode Sinhala font released by Microsoft.

It is a Unicode font developed by Microsoft, designed to accurately represent Sinhala characters on digital platforms. Iskoola Pota is widely utilized in various digital applications, including word processing software, web design, and mobile devices, to enable Sinhala speakers to communicate effectively in their native language online. Its clear and legible design makes it a popular choice for both professional and personal use, contributing to the preservation and promotion of the Sinhala language in the digital age.

- Tusitha Randunuge and Niranjan Meegammana at http://www.kaputa.com released Kaputa Unicode Fonts and Keyboard drivers.

2004-2006

- Formation of Sinhala Unicode Committee standardized Sinhala Keyboards bringing in developers Thibus, Helawadana and e fusion Pvt ltd, Lakehouse, Government Printer, Colombo and Moratuwa Universities, ICTA and SLS policy makers.
- Sinhala Unicode Group a community group founded by Niranjan Meegammana, starts popularizing use of Sinhala Unicode and provides support and collaboration as a community initiative. This active group helped solving many technical issues and impact taking Sinhala Unicode to masses.
- http://www.gov.lk the first Sinhala Unicode web site developed by Nirnajan Meegammana for Information and Communication Technology Agency (ICTA) at efusion pvt ltd. Inspires the government of Sri Lanka to use Sinhala Unicode in online content.
- Sinhala SP for Windows developed by Native Innovation (Pvt) Ltd is a more complete software solution to its predecessor Sinhala Text Box. Its developer (Dasith Wijesiriwardena) introduces a new IME (Input Method Editor) technology by the name of “FutureSinhala” which acts as a bridge between the proprietary fonts/keyboards and the new Unicode/SLS1134 standard. It fully supports working with and converting Thibus, Helawadana and Kaputa font based documents to SLS1134. It ships with a transliteration scheme that works at the Windows OS level (called "Singlish") which has advanced support for Sinhala-English and Tamil-English using a QWERTY keyboard.
- Kaputa Uniwriter is a real time Sinhala Unicode Input System and a trainer introduced by http://www.kaputa.com.
- "Shilpa Sayura" The first Sinhala Unicode e-Learning system with content for national education developed by Niranjan Meegammana with a grant form Information and communication Technology Agency to e fusion pvt ltd. Inspires rural telecentres to use Sinhala Unicode in education development. This project received several international awards for innovation of local language for rural education development. Shilpa Sayura used a java script based online Sinhala Input Method supporting Kaputa and Wijeysekara Keyboards.

2006

- In 2006, Rohan Manamudali and Sampath Godamunne, the original developers of the Thibus software suite, launched Sri Lanka’s first Sinhala–Tamil language translation initiative.

The system, known as the Thibus Translator, was developed to automatically convert textual content between Sinhala and Tamil—two constitutionally recognized national languages in Sri Lanka. The initiative aimed to improve communication and accessibility across communities, and was one of the earliest efforts in rule-based machine translation for Sri Lankan languages. Though limited in scope compared to later AI-driven tools, it demonstrated the feasibility of interlanguage translation using structured lexicons, grammar parsing, and word substitution techniques. This project followed the team’s previous achievements, including the Thibus Trilingual Word Processor (1989) and the Thibus Dictionary (2000), marking another significant step in local language computing and NLP (Natural Language Processing) development in Sri Lanka.

2007-2009

- Sinhala Input Method Editor developed by SoftDevex (Pvt) Ltd that uses an exciting new input method for typing Sinhalese characters using conventional keyboard.
- In order to provide the instructions on installation of Sinhala Unicode and provide the required software to the users, ICTA with the support of University of Colombo School of Computing (UCSC) established www.fonts.lk. The servers and software for the site was provided free of charge by UCSC. ICTA developed 3 more websites in 2007 in order to extend the support provided by www.fonts.lk in local languages. While www.emadumilihal.lk provides information and software for using Tamil Unicode, http://www.locallanguages.lk provides information and software for using both Sinhala and Tamil Unicode.
- Online edition of Madura English-Sinhala Dictionary website http://www.maduraonline.com launched. This is the first online English-Sinhala dictionary and language translator in Sri Lanka.
- Realtime Singlish (Another transliteration IME) was first released on April 13 of 2009 by Madura A., latest version is 2.0 (at time of editing). The first Sinhala Unicode which has a correct starting "TNW_Uni" has been developed by Thambaru Wijesekara.

=== 2010–present ===
2014

- Android app of Madura English-Sinhala Dictionary, Madura Online launched on Google Play store.
- A Mac OS X dictionary for Sinhalese is made available. Assembled by Bhagya Nirmaan Silva, the dictionary was created with the re-use of work done by Buddhika Siddhisena and Language Technology Research Laboratory of University of Colombo, School of Computing in 2008.
- The first standards compliant Sinhala Keyboard for Apple iOS was created and published by Bhagya Nirmaan Silva. This keyboard featured a copyrighted custom layout that was based on SLS 1134:2004 but was heavily optimised for mobile keyboards.

2016

- Siththara Image viewer ("සිත්තරා") is first image viewer with Sinhala supported interface and was first released on March 1, 2016, developed by J A Kasun Buddhika.
