= Sinhala numerals =

Numerals of the South Asian language

Sinhala numerals, are the units of the numeral system, originating from the Indian subcontinent, used in Sinhala language in modern-day Sri Lanka.

== Numerals or numerations around Kandyan Kingdom ==
It had been found that five different types of numerations were used in the Sinhala language at the time of the invasion of the Kandyan kingdom by the British. Out of the five types of numerations, two sets of numerations were in use in the twentieth century mainly for astrological calculations and to express traditional year and dates in ephemerides. The five types or sets of numerals or numerations are listed below.

=== Sinhala archaic numerals or Sinhala Illakkam ===
Abraham Mendis Gunasekera, in A Comprehensive Grammar of Sinhalese Language (1891), described a set of archaic numerals which were no longer in use. According to Mr. Gunesekera, these numerals were used for ordinary calculations and to express simple numbers. Gunasekera wrote:

The Sinhalase had symbols of its own to represent the different numerals which were in use until the beginning of the present century. Arabic Figures are now universally used. For the benefit of the student, the old numerals are given in the plate opposite (No. iii.).

Sinhala numerals did not have a zero and they also did not have zero concept holder. They included separate symbols for 10, 40, 50, 100, 1000.

These numerals were also regarded as Lith Lakunu or ephemeris numbers by W. A. De Silva in his Catalogue of Palm leaf manuscripts in the library of Colombo Museum. This set of numerals was known as Sinhala illakkam or Sinhala archaic numerals.

Sinhala numerals or Sinhala illakkam were used in the Kandyan convention which was signed between Kandyan Chieftains and the British governor, Robert Brownrig, in 1815. Eleven clauses were numbered in Arabic numerals in the English part of the agreement, and the parallel Sinhala clauses were numbered in Sinhala archaic numerals.

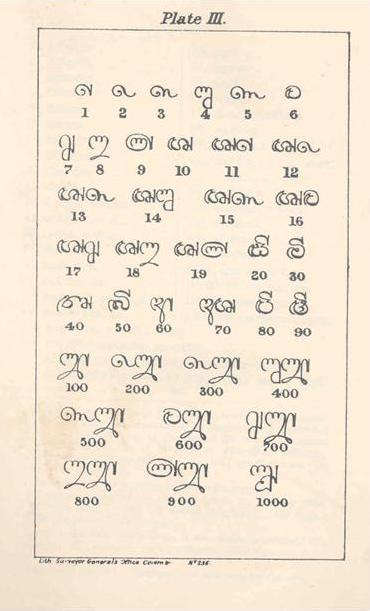
Archaic Sinhala numerals from Plate III of Gunasekera's A Comprehensive Grammar of Sinhalese Language.

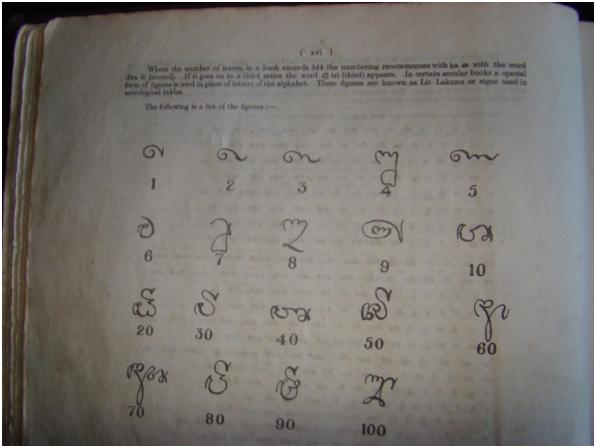
Archaic Sinhala numerals from ‘Catalogue of Palm leaf manuscripts in the library of Colombo Museum’, Volume I, compiled by W. A. De Silva, published by the Government Printer in 1938.

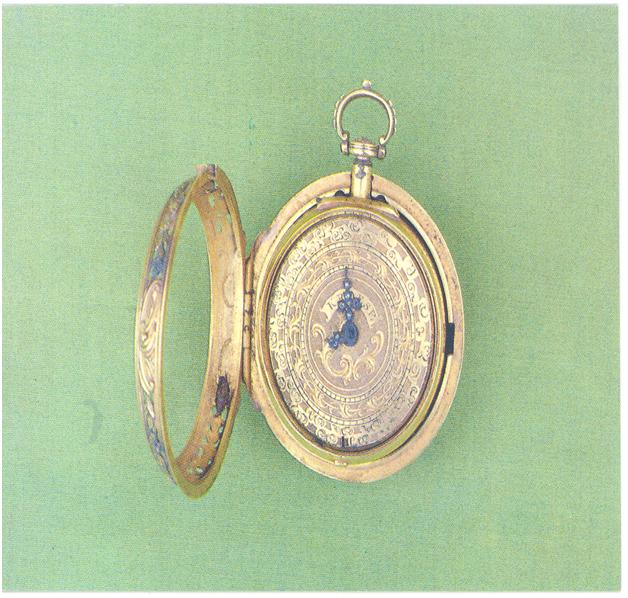
A day had sixty Sinhala hora or hours. This watch, which belonged to the last king of Kandy, shows thirty horas or hours in Sinhala Illakkam. Even today, Sinhala astrologers express time of birth in Sinhala Hora or Hours for casting horoscopes.

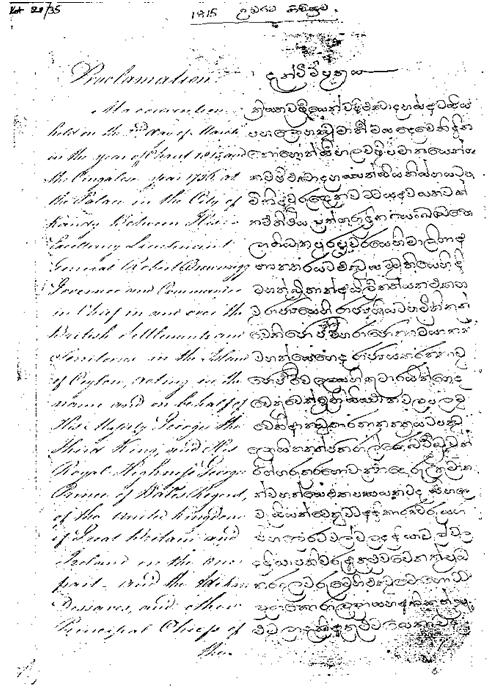
The Kandyan Convention of 1815, using Sinhala archaic numerals.

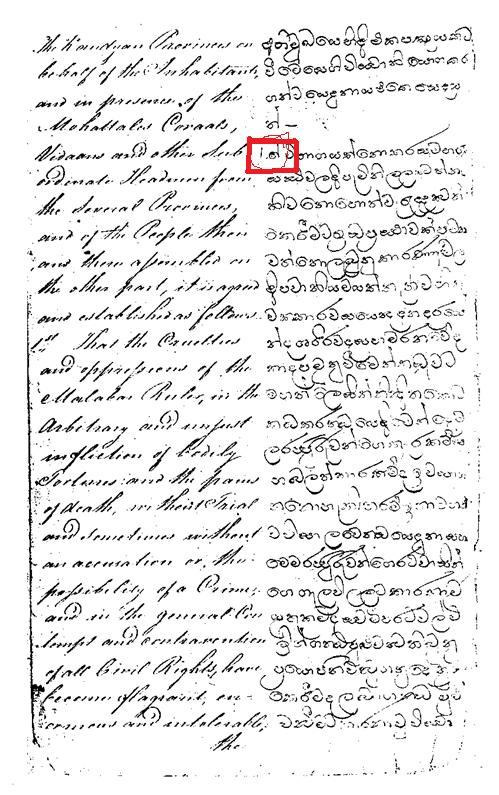
The first page of Kandyan Convention. The first clause of the convention is numbered with Sinhala Illakkam. The numeral 'one' is marked with a red square.

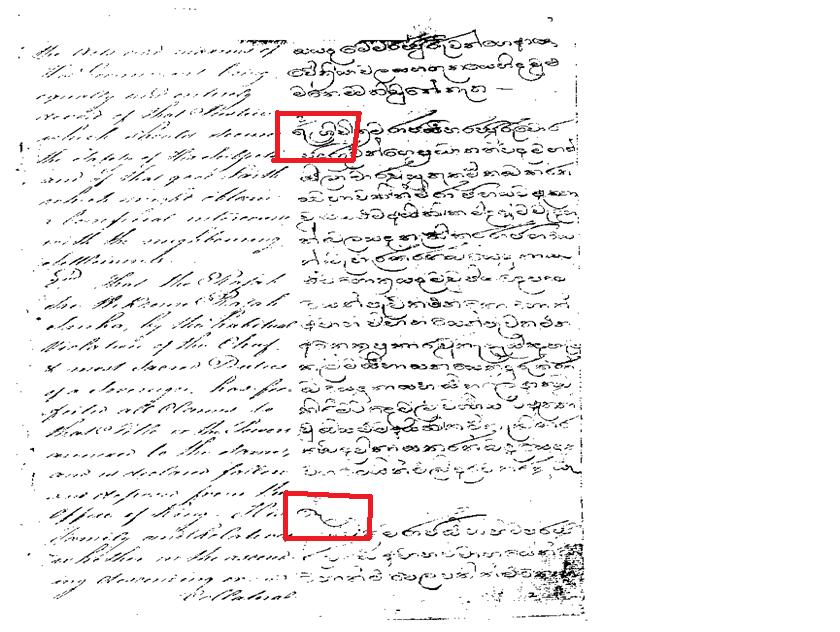
The second page of Kandyan Convention. The second and third clauses of the convention are numbered with Sinhala Illakkam.

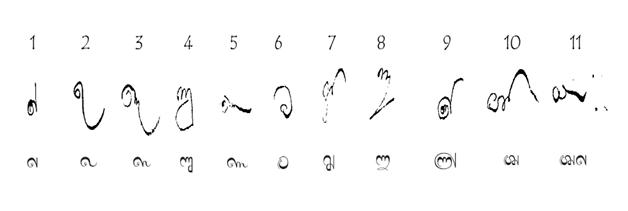
All eleven numerals found in the Kandyan Convention are given in the second row and the corresponding numerals which are given by Mendis Gunesekera are given below for comparison. Number 2 and 3 of Sinhala Illakkam have a slight variation.

=== Sinhala astrological numerals or Sinhala Lith Illakkam ===
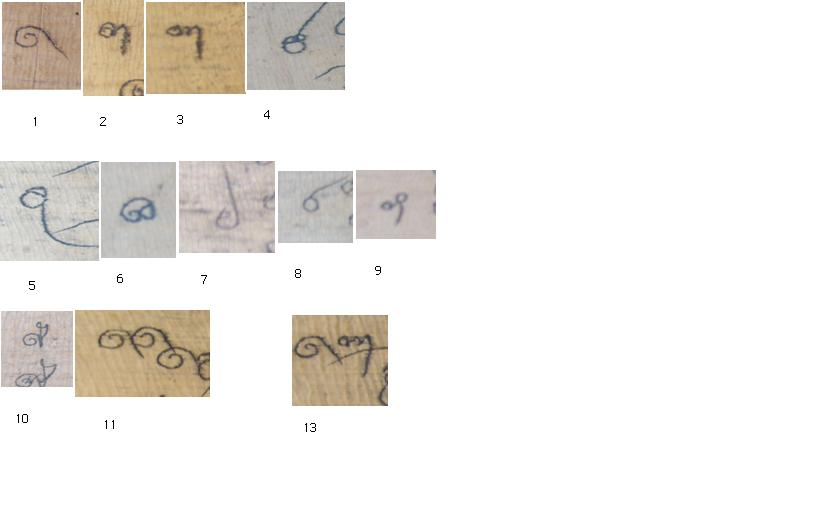
Sinhala Lith Illakkam or Sinhala Astrological Numbers. Zero of Lith Illakkam is Halantha or Hal Lakuna. Hal Lakuna or Halantha removes the inherent vowel sound in a consonant. This is the first version of Sinhala Lith Illakkam and is the oldest version found. Please note Number 2, 3, and 9 are given by shapes which are similar to older Murthda 'Na'.

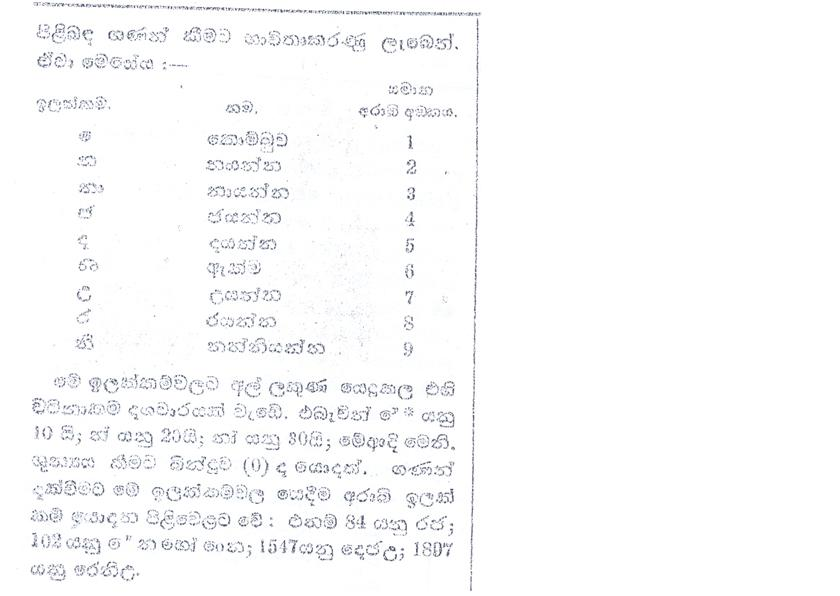
Abraham Mendis Gunesekera became famous for the Sinhala Grammar Book which was written by him in the latter part of the 18th century. This book also gave the shapes of Sinhala Illakkam. Here in a rare magazine Article, he describes Lith Illakkam and he further suggests instead of using Hallantha or Hal Lakuna for zero to use modern zero. He writes in this article large numbers with Lith Illakkam.

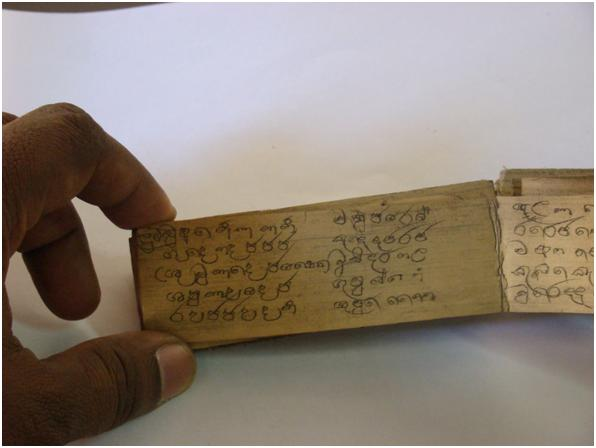
This Ola was found at Kandy museum and it contains Astrological calculations. The book have been written in the 17th century.

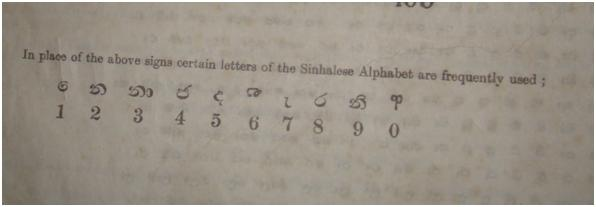
This is the second version of Lith illakkam found in the modern books.

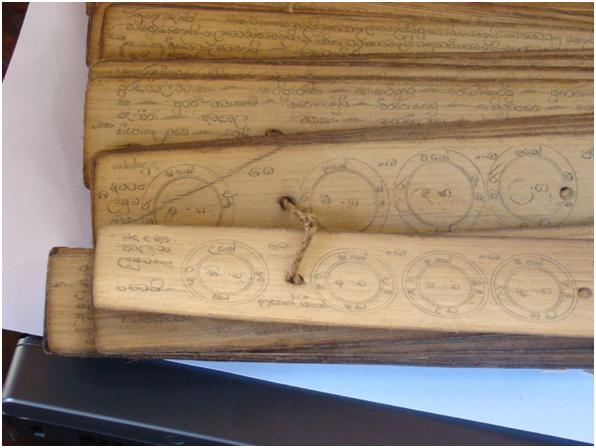
An astrological text book found in the Kandy Museum with Lith Illakkam.

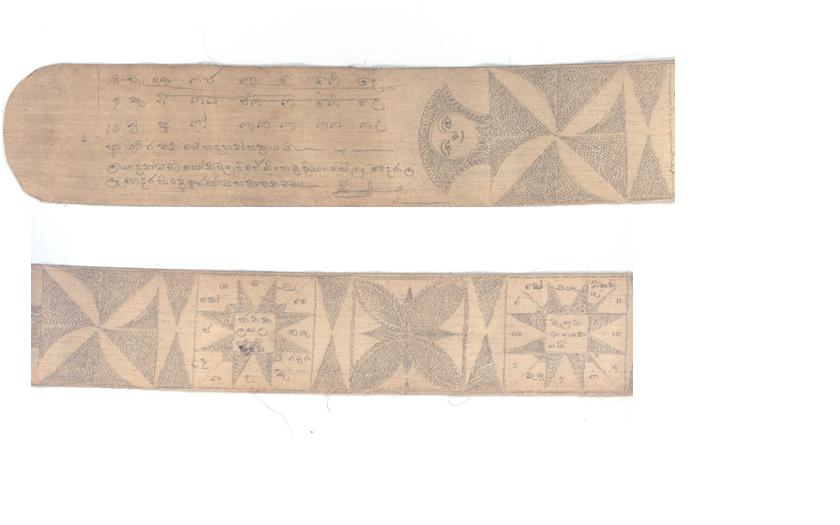
A rare horoscope which was cast in 1936 with mixture of Lith Illakkam and Arabic numerals. Please note 'Thunda Litha' in Lith Illakkam.

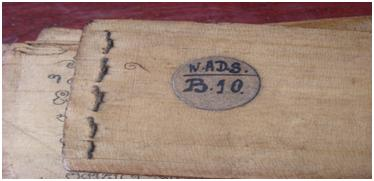
Page numbering with Lith Illakkam. Page numbers of Ola which are non buddhist topics are numbered with Lith Illakkam.

Although this numeral set was commonly used for casting horoscopes and to carry out astrological calculations, it had been found that this set had been used for numbering pages of Ola palm leaf books which covered primarily of non-Buddhist topics in Sinhala. Numbers of lith illakkam look Sinhala letters and vowel modifiers, and it had been discovered that there are mainly two versions of these illakkam according to the way numbers 2, 3 and 9 are written. The number six is known as ‘akma’ in the Lith Illakkam. These numerals were in use continuously for writing horoscopes on Ola leaf, the tradition of which continued till the beginning of the twentieth century. Both versions of Lith illakkam have a zero and the zero is the Halantha or Hal lakuna (kodiya) in the Sinhala language. Although it is not understood whether Sinhala mathematicians treated zero as a number, it was quite possible they had known the concept of zero. In Lith Illakkam, numbers greater than zero were written the same way as the Arabic numbers with the zero and the value of the number in the left was increased by ten. In other words, Lith illakkam had a zero and a zero place holder concept. Lith illakkum version 1 had for 2, 3 and 9, Sinhala letter ‘Murthda Na’ in 6 to 8th century. In the second version of Lith Illakkam as W. A. De Silva had depicted in his book, 2,3 and 9, Sinhala letter, ‘Na’ (න) with vowel modifiers.

One of the most interesting articles which had been discovered is an article on numerals and numerations in Sinhala language, the authorship of which has been attributed to Abrham Mendis Gunesekera. In this article, he refers to Lith Illakam as well as to Sinhala Illakkam. For Sinhala illakkam, he produces the same shapes which had been given in his English book. Abraham Mendis Gunesekera uses modern Sinhala letters and vowel modifiers which is the Version 2 of Lith illakkam. In this article, he clearly mentions that Hal lakuna or ‘Kodiya’ is the zero. In other words, ‘Sunayathana’ is filled with a kodiya will multiply by ten of the number which is on the left side of Sunayasthana. Abrham Mendis Gunesekera clearly states that instead of Hal lakuna of the Sinhala language, a ‘Shunaya binduawa’ (zero) can be used to fill the ‘Shunayasthana’ (Zero Place Holder). In other words, Lith Illakkum uses duality of zero to write numbers greater than 9.

=== Katapayadiya ===
Even to this day, years are given in the front page of popular ephemeris in Sri Lanka, ‘Panchanga Lith’ using ‘Katapayadiya’. Katapayadiya is a unique numbering scheme where numbers 1 to 9 and 0 have been depicted by Sinhala consonants. The katapayadiya is mainly used for writing dates. This is numeration is known as Katapayadiya since number one is allocated with the Sinhala letters ‘Ka’ (ක), ‘Ta’ (ට), ‘Pa’ (ප) and ‘Ya’ (ය) . In this tradition of writing numbers, the year 2007 can be written with for instance ‘Ka’ (ඛ) ‘Na’ (න) ‘Na’ (න) ‘Sa’ (ස). Traditionally, 2007 will be written from right to left: 7002. Ordinarily, using vowel modifiers, a word in Sanskrit will be created for the year 2007 (7002 right to left) with the allocated letters for 7002. When reading, one has to remove the vowel modifier. Katapayadiya was widely used by South Indian astrologers and some of Chola rock inscriptions in Sri Lanka have dates inscribed in Katapyadia.

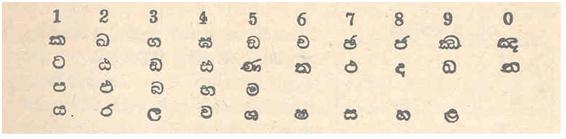
Katapayadiya

=== Page numbering of Ola leaves using Sinhala ‘Swara’ ===
The method of page numbering of Ola using Sinhala Swara with consonants had been common tradition in the ancient and recent history of Sri Lanka. The author had found that using Sinhala Swara in place of numeration could be traced back to Aryabhata's (the great Indian Mathematician and Astronomer) numbering system where he used Sanskrit Swaras in place of numerals. Sinhala scribes had developed its own numeration based upon Sinhala characters according to the order of the position of consonants and vowels in the Sinhala Alphabet without the modern two vowels: ‘Ae’ (ඇ) and ‘Ae:’ (ඈ) in the Sinhala Alphabet (the Sinhala alphabet without the above-mentioned two vowels is known as ‘Pansal Hodiya’ or the alphabet of the temple). The numeration method which is similar to the use of Sinhala Swara is found in Burmese Ola collection.

The tradition of Swara as numeration in page numbering in Ola had been commonly used for Buddhist manuscripts. The authors had the opportunity of examining several Ola palm leaf books which are in the Colombo Museum and the catalogues of Hugh Neville collection in the London Museum. Having investigated paging of Ola leaves, the majority of palm leaf manuscripts which are in the museum had Sinhala consonants with ‘swara’ (ස්වර) (combinations of sounds) for numbering. The number of combinations which can be made out of consonants is 544 and once the first 544 finishes, paging begins with the second cycle of 544 with the word ‘dwi:’ (ද්වී) or second in English. If the second cycle does not end the palm leaf book, it goes into third cycle of 544 which begins with the word ‘three’ (ත්රීp) or Three in English.

=== Bhootha Anka or Butha Samkaya ===
In Sinhala literature, certain words in the language were used to denote numbers. For instance, sky is associated with zero or ‘Sunaya’, and a number which was denoted by words is known as Bhuta Anka. Bhootha Anka was created by ancient Sanskrit mathematicians and astronomers prior to the invention of a symbol for zero. Some of the words which are associated with numbers are

- Moon = one
- Eye = two
- Fire = three

To write 130, one would place moon, fire, sky together to form the number.

Pierre-Sylvain Filliozat, in his article ‘Ancient Sanskrit Mathematics: An oral tradition and a written literature”, describes Bhootha Anka as object-number metronomic expressions.

As it was mentioned previously, knowledge was transferred through memory rather than writing it down. In order to make memorization easier, it is natural that the numbers are placed as words and the words are formulated sequentially that they would sound rhythmical. The Indian tradition of Bhootha anka was imported to Sri Lanka as it was used in India and the tradition continued with Sinahala words that had same meanings.

== Brahmi numerals found in Sri Lanka ==
Dr. Paranavithana (first Sri Lankan Commissioner of Archaeology) and Dr. Abaya Aryiasinha had independently found in their research that the Sinhalese had used numerals which closely resembled Brahmi numerals of India in the early days of Sinhala civilization. The evidence for use of Brahmi numerals had been discovered primarily in rock inscriptions which were inscribed in between AD 200 and 400. These numerals were used to record donations given by royals and other people who were belonged to the upper echelon of ancient Sinhala society to Buddhist temples. Brahmi numerals are ancestors of Arabic numerals which are used presently worldwide. Brahmi numerals had symbols for 10,100, and 1000. Number 1 and 10 in Brahmi have not been found in Sri Lanka up to now. Therefore, shapes of these two numerals have been hypothesized taking into consideration of shapes of Brahmi Number 1 and 10 found in India without physical evidence . Sinhala rock inscriptions suddenly become barren of numerals from A.D. 400 onwards. Tradition of writing numbers in word becomes more prevalent from the above period.

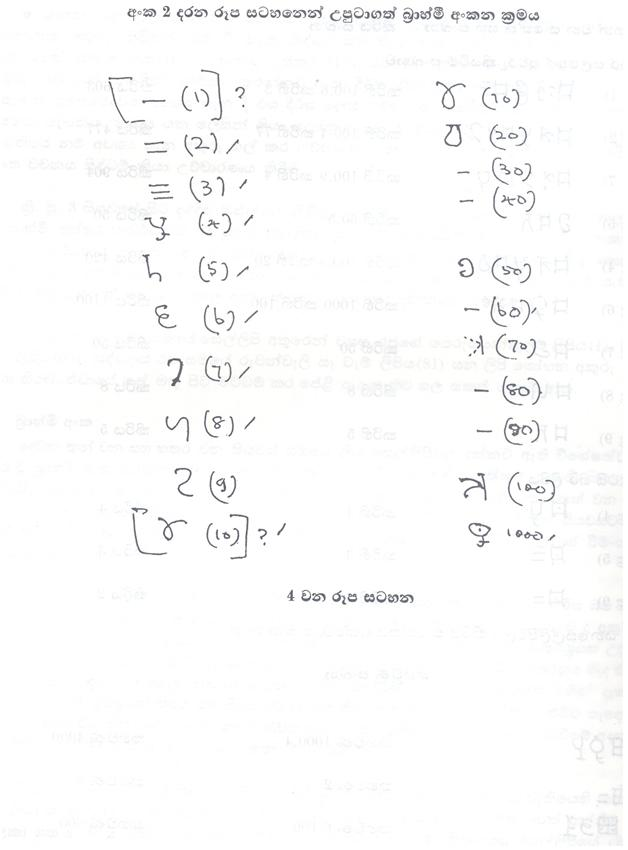
In Sri Lanka, number 1 and 10 have not been physically found. In addition, In Sri Lanka Brahmi numerals 30, 40, 80 and 90 seemed to have not been also discovered.

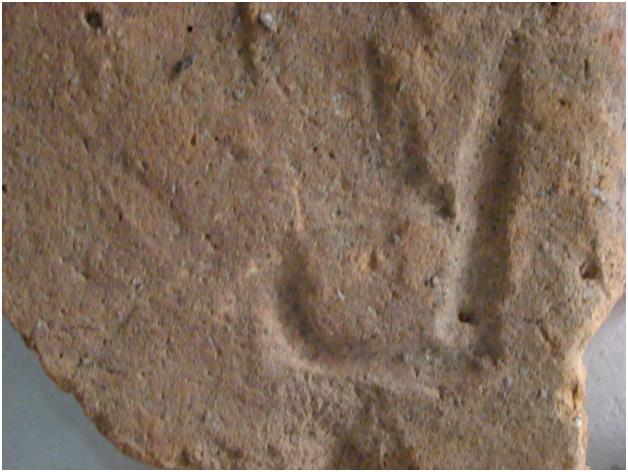
Brahmi Numeral Four on a tile, Kandy Museum Sri Lanka

== Research into Sinhala numerals ==
Although a few scholars had recorded the existence of Sinhala numerals after 1815, a comprehensive research was required to establish the past existence and precise shapes of these numerals.

The proposal, L2/07-002R (ISO/IEC JTC1/SC2/WG2 N3195R), which was submitted by Mr. Michael Everson to the Unicode consortium for encoding a set of numerals which he claimed were Sinhala numerals, initiated research into Sinhala numerals and numerations. Through the research which was carried out by Mr. Harsha Wijayawardhana of University of Colombo School of Computing (UCSC) under the aegis of the Information and Communication Technology Agency (ICTA) of Sri Lanka, it was discovered that other than the set of numerals submitted by Mr. Michael Everson for encoding, there were four other sets which were commonly used by Sinhala scribes, namely Sinhala Lith Illakkam (Astrological Digits) mainly used for writing horoscopes; Swara, (Sinhala Consonant and vowel modifier based numerals); Katapayadiya, a special Sinhala character based numeral set which was used for inscribing years in astrological writing, in ancient Ola and in rock inscriptions; and word based Bootha Anka or Samkaya used in Sinhala Poetry. Mr. Wijayawardhana identified the numeral set which was submitted by Mr. Michael Everson to UCS as Sinhala Illakkam (Sinhala Archaic Numerals).

Subsequently, Prof. K.D. Paranvithana of Raja Rata University, Sri Lanka, and Mr. Harsha Wijayawardhana carried out further research and the findings were presented at the National Archaeological Symposium held in July 2009, in Colombo, Sri Lanka, organized by the Department of Archaeology. The Synopsis of the paper was published in the Volume II of the Symposium's proceedings. In October 2009, Mr. Harsha Wijayawardhana authored a book titled “Numerations in the Sinhala Language”.

The research into Sinhala numerals were carried out from both the linguistic and mathematical perspectives. In their research, the researchers had looked specifically for the existence of zero in any form of numerations in the Sinhala language, since the invention of zero had been a major demarcation point in mathematics and advancement in modern pure mathematics would have not been possible without having the concept of zero. Although zero had been discovered and re-discovered independently by various civilizations in the world, it is now accepted that zero as an independent number was discovered and used for the first time by the Indian mathematicians and it had been taken to the west by the Arabs with the rest of numerals which were developed in India from Brahmi numerals. E.T. Bell in his book, the development of Mathematics, describes of the development of zero by Indian mathematicians in the following manner: “The problem of numeration was finally solved by Hindus at some controversial date before A.D. 800. The introduction of zero as a symbol denoting the absence of units or of certain powers of ten in a number represented by the Hindu numerals has been rated as one of the greatest practical inventions of all time”.

In their research into Sinhala numerals or numerations, the authors had looked into the following:

- Papers or publications on Sinhala numerals
- Original documents which had some of form of numerals or numerations
- Rock inscriptions
- Ola leaf page numbering
- Any evidence for zero in Sinhala numerals or numerations
- Numismatics

Shapes of several numeral sets which belong to Indic languages were compared with of the numerals sets which were identified as numerals or numerations in the Sinhala language. The Indic numerals sets which were studied extensively were Thai, Lao, Burmese, and Malayalam numerals. Colombo and Kandy museum were visited many instances to study Ola leaf pagination by the researchers. Colombo museum library hosts to an Ola leaf collection which is known as W. A. De Silva Collection and this sizable collection amounts to be 5000. Some of the original and older Ola leaf collections were found to be outside of Sri Lanka. A major collection is located in Britain and is known as Hue Neville collection and the catalogue of this collection is available in Sri Lanka. Other country museums that are reputed to host to Sinhala Ola leaf collections are in Arizona, US, Brussels, Belgium and Netherlands.

== Numerals ==
Sinhala Illakkam (Non-Zero system)
| Hindu-Arabic numerals | 1 | 2 | 3 | 4 | 5 | 6 | 7 | 8 | 9 | 10 | 20 | 30 | 40 | 50 | 60 | 70 | 80 | 90 | 100 | 1000 |
| Sinhala archaic numerals | 𑇡 | 𑇢 | 𑇣 | 𑇤 | 𑇥 | 𑇦 | 𑇧 | 𑇨 | 𑇩 | 𑇪 | 𑇫 | 𑇬 | 𑇭 | 𑇮 | 𑇯 | 𑇰 | 𑇱 | 𑇲 | 𑇳 | 𑇴 |

Sinhala Lith Illakkam (Zero place-holder system)
| Hindu-Arabic numerals | 0 | 1 | 2 | 3 | 4 | 5 | 6 | 7 | 8 | 9 |
| Sinhala astrological numerals | ෦ | ෧ | ෨ | ෩ | ෪ | ෫ | ෬ | ෭ | ෮ | ෯ |

== See also ==
- Sinhala Archaic Numbers

== Bibliography ==
- Wijayawardhana, Harsha (2009). Numerations in the Sinhala Language. Strategic Communications and Media Unit – ICTA. ISBN 978-955-1199-05-0.
- Hettigoda; De Silva, Hendrick (1987) [1967]. Life and Planets, Vishwa Lekha, Sarvodaya. pp. 34–36.
- Indian Epigraphy: A Guide to the Study of Inscriptions in Sanskrit, Prakrit, and the Other Indo-Aryan Languages. Oxford University Press US. 1998.
- "Numeration by Kularathne P.D.S.". Sinhala Encyclopedia. 1967.
- Menninger, Karl; Broneer, Paul (1992). Number words and number symbols: A cultural history. Courier Dover Publications.
- Samaranayake, V.K.; Nandasara, S.T.; Dissanayake, J.B.; Weerasinghe, A.R.; Wijayawardhana, H. (2003). "An Introduction to UNICODE for Sinhala Characters" (PDF). Portal for Sinhala & Tamil Languages. UCSC Technical Report 03/01. University of Colombo School of Computing. Archived from the original on 18 September 2021.
