= Lanka Linux User Group =

Lanka Linux User Group, also known as LK-LUG, is an organization in Sri Lanka for promoting free software. Since its beginnings in 1998 with 40 members, hundreds of Linux enthusiasts from several countries have joined.

Members include both home and business users of Linux. Activities of the group include helping each other over the mailing lists, educating the general public by participating at exhibitions, workshops and media, and encouraging the use of free and open-source software (FOSS) in national ICT programmes.

LK-LUG also is working on localisation of the Linux desktop to the Sinhala language, and has so far localised some major components. There also exist a Sinhala Font package developed by LK-LUG. A Live-CD based Linux distribution is available.

== See also ==
- History of Sinhala software
