= Sinhala Archaic Numbers =

- Range: U+111E0..U+111FF (32 code points)
- Plane: SMP
- Scripts: Sinhala
- Symbol sets: Sinhala Illakkam
- Assigned: 20 code points
- Unused: 12 reserved code points

Unicode version history
- 7.0 (2014): 20 (+20)

Unicode documentation
- Code chart ∣ Web page

Sinhala Archaic Numbers is a Unicode block containing Sinhala Illakkam number characters.

== Block ==
Sinhala Archaic Numbers^{[1]}^{[2]} Official Unicode Consortium code chart (PDF)
	0	1	2	3	4	5	6	7	8	9	A	B	C	D	E	F
U+111Ex		𑇡	𑇢	𑇣	𑇤	𑇥	𑇦	𑇧	𑇨	𑇩	𑇪	𑇫	𑇬	𑇭	𑇮	𑇯
U+111Fx	𑇰	𑇱	𑇲	𑇳	𑇴											
Notes: 1. As of Unicode version 17.0; 2. Grey areas indicate non-assigned code points

== History ==
The following Unicode-related documents record the purpose and process of defining specific characters in the Sinhala Archaic Numbers block:

Version	Final code points (Note: Proposed code points and characters names may differ from final code points and names)	Count	L2 ID	WG2 ID	Document
7.0	U+111E1..111F4	20	L2/97-018	N1473R	Everson, Michael (1997-03-01), Proposal for encoding the Sinhala script in ISO/IEC 10646 (revision 1)
7.0	U+111E1..111F4	20	L2/97-030	N1503 (pdf, doc)	Umamaheswaran, V. S.; Ksar, Mike (1997-04-01), "8.6", Unconfirmed Minutes of WG 2 Meeting #32, Singapore; 1997-01-20--24
7.0	U+111E1..111F4	20	L2/99-010	N1903 (pdf, html, doc)	Umamaheswaran, V. S. (1998-12-30), Minutes of WG 2 meeting 35, London, U.K.; 1998-09-21--25
7.0	U+111E1..111F4	20	L2/07-002R	N3195R	Everson, Michael (2007-02-08), Proposal to add archaic numbers for Sinhala to the BMP of the UCS
7.0	U+111E1..111F4	20	L2/07-015		Moore, Lisa (2007-02-08), "Archaic numbers for Sinhala (C.12)", UTC #110 Minutes
7.0	U+111E1..111F4	20	L2/08-007		Inclusion of archaic Sinhala numerals in the Sinhala character code range, 2008-01-07
7.0	U+111E1..111F4	20	L2/08-068		Dias, Gihan (2008-01-28), Archaic Sinhala Numerals
7.0	U+111E1..111F4	20	L2/08-105		Observations on the Encoding of Archaic Sinhala Numerals in Unicode/UCS, 2008-02-05
7.0	U+111E1..111F4	20	L2/08-003		Moore, Lisa (2008-02-14), "Archaic Sinhala Numerals", UTC #114 Minutes
7.0	U+111E1..111F4	20	L2/10-165		Dias, Gihan (2010-05-03), Preliminary Proposal to Encode Sinhala Digits and Numerals
7.0	U+111E1..111F4	20	L2/10-301	N3876	Proposal to add archaic numbers for Sinhala to the BMP and SMP of the UCS, 2010-08-08
7.0	U+111E1..111F4	20	L2/10-312		Dias, Gihan (2010-08-10), Proposal to Encode Sinhala Archaic Numerals and Numbers
7.0	U+111E1..111F4	20	L2/10-337	N3888	Proposal to include Sinhala Numerals to the BMP and SMP of the UCS, 2010-08-19
7.0	U+111E1..111F4	20		N3888-A	Senaweera, L. N. (2010-09-10), Sri Lanka's proposal on Sinhala Numerals for inclusion in Information Technology - Universal Multiple Octet Coded Character Set, ISO/IEC 10646 : 2003
7.0	U+111E1..111F4	20		N3888-B	Unicode Character Properties of Sinhala Lith Illakkam (Sinhala Astrological Digits) and Sinhala Illakkam or Sinhala Archaic Numbers
7.0	U+111E1..111F4	20	L2/10-433		Wijayawardhana, Harsha; et al. (2010-10-23), RE: Background information on the use of Sinhala Numerals (L2/10-337)
7.0	U+111E1..111F4	20	L2/10-416R		Moore, Lisa (2010-11-09), "Sinhala Numerals", UTC #125 / L2 #222 Minutes
7.0	U+111E1..111F4	20		N3903 (pdf, doc)	"M57.14", Unconfirmed minutes of WG2 meeting 57, 2011-03-31
