= Sinhala (Unicode block) =

- Range: U+0D80..U+0DFF (128 code points)
- Plane: BMP
- Scripts: Sinhala
- Major alphabets: Sinhala; Pali; Sanskrit
- Assigned: 91 code points
- Unused: 37 reserved code points

Unicode version history
- 3.0 (1999): 80 (+80)
- 7.0 (2014): 90 (+10)
- 13.0 (2020): 91 (+1)

Unicode documentation
- Code chart ∣ Web page

Sinhala is a Unicode block containing characters for the Sinhala and Pali languages of Sri Lanka, and is also used for writing Sanskrit in Sri Lanka. The Sinhala allocation is loosely based on the ISCII standard, except that Sinhala contains extra prenasalized consonant letters, leading to inconsistencies with other ISCII-Unicode script allocations.

== Block ==
Sinhala^{[1]}^{[2]} Official Unicode Consortium code chart (PDF)
	0	1	2	3	4	5	6	7	8	9	A	B	C	D	E	F
U+0D8x		ඁ	ං	ඃ		අ	ආ	ඇ	ඈ	ඉ	ඊ	උ	ඌ	ඍ	ඎ	ඏ
U+0D9x	ඐ	එ	ඒ	ඓ	ඔ	ඕ	ඖ				ක	ඛ	ග	ඝ	ඞ	ඟ
U+0DAx	ච	ඡ	ජ	ඣ	ඤ	ඥ	ඦ	ට	ඨ	ඩ	ඪ	ණ	ඬ	ත	ථ	ද
U+0DBx	ධ	න		ඳ	ප	ඵ	බ	භ	ම	ඹ	ය	ර		ල		
U+0DCx	ව	ශ	ෂ	ස	හ	ළ	ෆ				්					ා
U+0DDx	ැ	ෑ	ි	ී	ු		ූ		ෘ	ෙ	ේ	ෛ	ො	ෝ	ෞ	ෟ
U+0DEx							෦	෧	෨	෩	෪	෫	෬	෭	෮	෯
U+0DFx			ෲ	ෳ	෴											
Notes: 1. As of Unicode version 16.0; 2. Grey areas indicate non-assigned code points

== History ==
The following Unicode-related documents record the purpose and process of defining specific characters in the Sinhala block:

Version	Final code points (Note: Proposed code points and characters names may differ from final code points and names)	Count	L2 ID	WG2 ID	Document
3.0	U+0D82..0D83, 0D85..0D96, 0D9A..0DB1, 0DB3..0DBB, 0DBD, 0DC0..0DC6, 0DCA, 0DCF..0DD4, 0DD6, 0DD8..0DDF, 0DF2..0DF4	80	L2/97-019	N1480	Ginige, S. L. (1996-11-15), Request to add Sinhalese to 10646 based on recent Sinhalese Standard (SLS 1134-1996)
3.0	U+0D82..0D83, 0D85..0D96, 0D9A..0DB1, 0DB3..0DBB, 0DBD, 0DC0..0DC6, 0DCA, 0DCF..0DD4, 0DD6, 0DD8..0DDF, 0DF2..0DF4	80	L2/97-019.1		Sri Lanka standard Sinhala character code for information interchange
3.0	U+0D82..0D83, 0D85..0D96, 0D9A..0DB1, 0DB3..0DBB, 0DBD, 0DC0..0DC6, 0DCA, 0DCF..0DD4, 0DD6, 0DD8..0DDF, 0DF2..0DF4	80	L2/97-018	N1473R	Everson, Michael (1997-03-01), Proposal for encoding the Sinhala script in ISO/IEC 10646 (revision 1)
3.0	U+0D82..0D83, 0D85..0D96, 0D9A..0DB1, 0DB3..0DBB, 0DBD, 0DC0..0DC6, 0DCA, 0DCF..0DD4, 0DD6, 0DD8..0DDF, 0DF2..0DF4	80		N1532	Ross, Hugh McGregor (1997-03-07), Comment on Sri Lanka Proposal for Sinhala Script
3.0	U+0D82..0D83, 0D85..0D96, 0D9A..0DB1, 0DB3..0DBB, 0DBD, 0DC0..0DC6, 0DCA, 0DCF..0DD4, 0DD6, 0DD8..0DDF, 0DF2..0DF4	80	L2/97-030	N1503 (pdf, doc)	Umamaheswaran, V. S.; Ksar, Mike (1997-04-01), "8.6", Unconfirmed Minutes of WG 2 Meeting #32, Singapore; 1997-01-20--24
3.0	U+0D82..0D83, 0D85..0D96, 0D9A..0DB1, 0DB3..0DBB, 0DBD, 0DC0..0DC6, 0DCA, 0DCF..0DD4, 0DD6, 0DD8..0DDF, 0DF2..0DF4	80	L2/97-145	N1589	Everson, Michael (1997-06-13), Mapping of Sinhala between ISO/IEC 10646 and SLS 1134
3.0	U+0D82..0D83, 0D85..0D96, 0D9A..0DB1, 0DB3..0DBB, 0DBD, 0DC0..0DC6, 0DCA, 0DCF..0DD4, 0DD6, 0DD8..0DDF, 0DF2..0DF4	80		N1585	Disanayaka, J. B. (1997-06-25), Towards Standard Sinhala Character Code
3.0	U+0D82..0D83, 0D85..0D96, 0D9A..0DB1, 0DB3..0DBB, 0DBD, 0DC0..0DC6, 0DCA, 0DCF..0DD4, 0DD6, 0DD8..0DDF, 0DF2..0DF4	80		N1584	Adams, Glenn (1997-06-30), Feedback on Sinhala Script Proposals (N1480, N 1473R, etc.)
3.0	U+0D82..0D83, 0D85..0D96, 0D9A..0DB1, 0DB3..0DBB, 0DBD, 0DC0..0DC6, 0DCA, 0DCF..0DD4, 0DD6, 0DD8..0DDF, 0DF2..0DF4	80	L2/97-158	N1613	Report of ad-hoc group on Sinhala encoding, 1997-07-02
3.0	U+0D82..0D83, 0D85..0D96, 0D9A..0DB1, 0DB3..0DBB, 0DBD, 0DC0..0DC6, 0DCA, 0DCF..0DD4, 0DD6, 0DD8..0DDF, 0DF2..0DF4	80	L2/97-288	N1603	Umamaheswaran, V. S. (1997-10-24), "8.7", Unconfirmed Meeting Minutes, WG 2 Meeting # 33, Heraklion, Crete, Greece, 20 June – 4 July 1997
3.0	U+0D82..0D83, 0D85..0D96, 0D9A..0DB1, 0DB3..0DBB, 0DBD, 0DC0..0DC6, 0DCA, 0DCF..0DD4, 0DD6, 0DD8..0DDF, 0DF2..0DF4	80	L2/98-319	N1896	Revised text of 10646-1/FPDAM 21, AMENDMENT 21: Sinhala, 1998-10-22
3.0	U+0D82..0D83, 0D85..0D96, 0D9A..0DB1, 0DB3..0DBB, 0DBD, 0DC0..0DC6, 0DCA, 0DCF..0DD4, 0DD6, 0DD8..0DDF, 0DF2..0DF4	80	L2/99-010	N1903 (pdf, html, doc)	Umamaheswaran, V. S. (1998-12-30), Minutes of WG 2 meeting 35, London, U.K.; 1998-09-21--25
3.0	U+0D82..0D83, 0D85..0D96, 0D9A..0DB1, 0DB3..0DBB, 0DBD, 0DC0..0DC6, 0DCA, 0DCF..0DD4, 0DD6, 0DD8..0DDF, 0DF2..0DF4	80	L2/10-164		Dias, Gihan (2010-05-05), Sinhala Named Sequences
3.0	U+0D82..0D83, 0D85..0D96, 0D9A..0DB1, 0DB3..0DBB, 0DBD, 0DC0..0DC6, 0DCA, 0DCF..0DD4, 0DD6, 0DD8..0DDF, 0DF2..0DF4	80	L2/10-108		Moore, Lisa (2010-05-19), "Consensus 123-C32", UTC #123 / L2 #220 Minutes, "Accept three Sinhala named sequences as provisional in Unicode 6.0..."
3.0	U+0D82..0D83, 0D85..0D96, 0D9A..0DB1, 0DB3..0DBB, 0DBD, 0DC0..0DC6, 0DCA, 0DCF..0DD4, 0DD6, 0DD8..0DDF, 0DF2..0DF4	80		N3903 (pdf, doc)	"M57.09 (Named USIs for Sinhala)", Unconfirmed minutes of WG2 meeting 57, 2011-03-31
7.0	U+0DE6..0DEF	10	L2/07-268	N3253 (pdf, doc)	Umamaheswaran, V. S. (2007-07-26), "M50.28", Unconfirmed minutes of WG 2 meeting 50, Frankfurt-am-Main, Germany; 2007-04-24/27
7.0	U+0DE6..0DEF	10	L2/08-007		Inclusion of archaic Sinhala numerals in the Sinhala character code range, 2008-01-07
7.0	U+0DE6..0DEF	10	L2/08-068		Dias, Gihan (2008-01-28), Archaic Sinhala Numerals
7.0	U+0DE6..0DEF	10	L2/08-105		Observations on the Encoding of Archaic Sinhala Numerals in Unicode/UCS, 2008-02-05
7.0	U+0DE6..0DEF	10	L2/08-003		Moore, Lisa (2008-02-14), "Archaic Sinhala Numerals", UTC #114 Minutes
7.0	U+0DE6..0DEF	10	L2/10-165		Dias, Gihan (2010-05-03), Preliminary Proposal to Encode Sinhala Digits and Numerals
7.0	U+0DE6..0DEF	10	L2/10-312		Dias, Gihan (2010-08-10), Proposal to Encode Sinhala Archaic Numerals and Numbers
7.0	U+0DE6..0DEF	10	L2/10-337	N3888	Proposal to include Sinhala Numerals to the BMP and SMP of the UCS, 2010-08-19
7.0	U+0DE6..0DEF	10		N3888-A	Senaweera, L. N. (2010-09-10), Sri Lanka's proposal on Sinhala Numerals for inclusion in Information Technology - Universal Multiple Octet Coded Character Set, ISO/IEC 10646 : 2003
7.0	U+0DE6..0DEF	10		N3888-B	Unicode Character Properties of Sinhala Lith Illakkam (Sinhala Astrological Digits) and Sinhala Illakkam or Sinhala Archaic Numbers
7.0	U+0DE6..0DEF	10	L2/10-433		Wijayawardhana, Harsha; et al. (2010-10-23), RE: Background information on the use of Sinhala Numerals (L2/10-337)
7.0	U+0DE6..0DEF	10	L2/10-416R		Moore, Lisa (2010-11-09), "Sinhala Numerals", UTC #125 / L2 #222 Minutes
7.0	U+0DE6..0DEF	10		N3903 (pdf, doc)	"M57.14", Unconfirmed minutes of WG2 meeting 57, 2011-03-31
13.0	U+0D81	1	L2/18-060	N4964	A, Srinidhi; A, Sridatta (2018-02-05), Proposal to encode the CANDRABINDU for Sinhala
13.0	U+0D81	1	L2/18-079		Anderson, Deborah (2018-03-21), Feedback on Sinhala candrabindu (L2/18-060)
13.0	U+0D81	1	L2/18-168		Anderson, Deborah; Whistler, Ken; Pournader, Roozbeh; Moore, Lisa; Liang, Hai; Chapman, Chris; Cook, Richard (2018-04-28), "10. Sinhala", Recommendations to UTC #155 April-May 2018 on Script Proposals
13.0	U+0D81	1	L2/18-115		Moore, Lisa (2018-05-09), "D.4.1", UTC #155 Minutes
13.0	U+0D81	1	L2/18-183		Moore, Lisa (2018-11-20), "B.1.3.1.1.1", UTC #156 Minutes
13.0	U+0D81	1		N5020 (pdf, doc)	Umamaheswaran, V. S. (2019-01-11), "10.3.14", Unconfirmed minutes of WG 2 meeting 67
13.0	U+0D81	1	L2/20-052		Pournader, Roozbeh (2020-01-15), Changes to Identifier_Type of some Unicode 13.0 characters
13.0	U+0D81	1	L2/20-015R		Moore, Lisa (2020-05-14), "B.13.4 Changes to Identifier_Type of some Unicode 13.0 characters", Draft Minutes of UTC Meeting 162
