= Madura English–Sinhala Dictionary =

Sri Lankan free electronic dictionary service

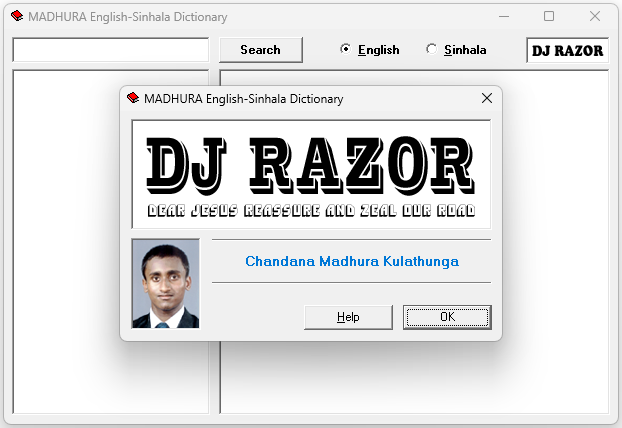
- Screenshot of Madura Dictionary showing the About screen
- Developers: Madura Kulatunga; Database: Thibus
- Initial release: 23 November 2002; 23 years ago
- License: Freeware
- Website: www.maduraonline.com

Madura English–Sinhala Dictionary (Sinhala: මධුර ඉංග්‍රීසි–සිංහල ශබ්දකෝෂය) is a free electronic dictionary service developed by Madura Kulatunga. It is available as computer software, an online website and an android app. The dictionary contains over 230,000 definitions including various technical terms. As of 2016, the dictionary has been downloaded approximately 1,000,000 and ranks 100th most visited sites in Sri Lanka. The dictionary is distributed as freeware. It was initially released on 23 November 2002.

== Development ==
Kulatunga, a Sri Lankan computer engineer, wrote a program in Visual Basic for an English–Sinhala dictionary, using the dictionary entries from the English–Sinhalese Dictionary of Gunapala Piyasena Malalasekera. The program was marketed from 23 November 2002. In 2008 he started a free internet version of it, the first online English–Sinhala dictionary. Kulatunga later admitted that he had infringed the copyright of the Malalasekera English–Sinhala dictionary in creating his software, but he said in 2015 that he no longer infringed on copyrights. In 2017 he developed and added Sinhala keyboard input method to his Google Play android app.

== See also ==
Madura Kulatunga
