= Helakuru =

Sri Lankan mobile application

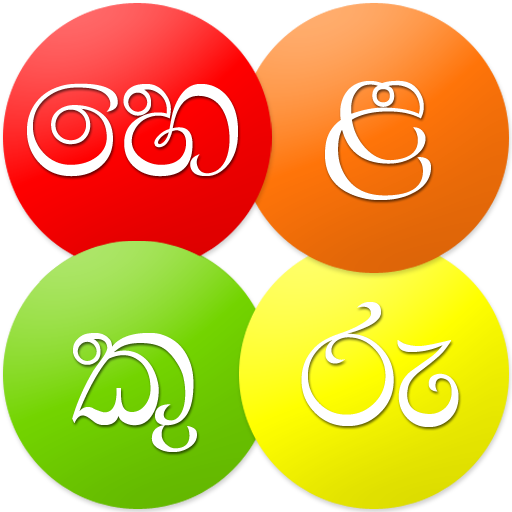
- Developer: Bhasha Lanka (Pvt) Ltd
- Release: 2011
- Platform: Android, iOS
- Available in: Sinhala,Tamil,English
- Type: Super-app
- License: Proprietary
- Website: https://www.helakuru.lk/

Helakuru is a widely used mobile application in Sri Lanka. Initially introduced as a keyboard app for typing in Sinhala, it subsequently evolved into a super app, expanding into various sectors such as digital payments, transportation services, healthcare, and information services.

== Services and Features ==
HelaPay

It was founded by Dhanika Perera, who serves as the Founder and Chief Executive Officer of Bhasha Lanka Private Limited. Bhasha Lanka (Pvt) Ltd won the Most Innovative ICT Entrepreneur of the Year award at the National Best Quality ICT Awards NBQSA. HelaPay is the digital financial services system integrated into the Helakuru app. Within two years of its launch, it succeeded in surpassing the milestone of Rs. 1 billion in digital transactions. It subsequently grew further, exceeding the Rs. 5 billion mark in total transaction value. Seylan Bank contributes to this initiative through FinTech technology, serving as the exclusive financial processor for the Helakuru app.

HelaGo

Helakuru introduced a ride-hailing service named HelaGo, targeting Sri Lanka's transportation sector. The company has entered into a strategic partnership with the David Pieris Group to foster a fairer and more innovative passenger transport culture.
