= Bharati Braille =

Braille system for languages of India

Bharati braille ⠘⠜⠗⠀⠞⠔⠀⠈⠃⠗⠑⠇
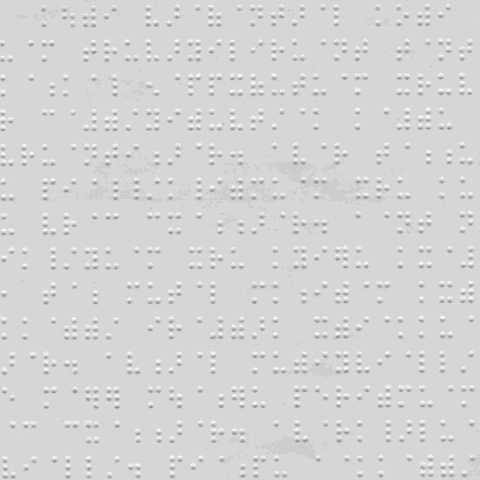
- Sample of Tamil Braille
- Script type: Alphabet
- Languages: various

Related scripts
- Parent systems: Night writing: Braille; English Braille; Bharati braille
- Child systems: Bengali Braille; Devanagari Braille; Gujarati Braille; Kannada Braille; Malayalam Braille; Odia Braille; Punjabi Braille; Sinhala Braille; Telugu Braille; Tamil Braille; Indian Urdu Braille

Bharati braille (/ˈbɑːrəti/ BAR-ə-tee), or Bharatiya Braille (Hindi: भारती ब्रेल bhāratī brēl IPA: [bʱaːɾət̪iː bɾɛːl] "Indian braille"), is a largely unified braille script for writing the languages of India. When India gained independence, eleven braille scripts were in use, in different parts of the country and for different languages. By 1951, a single national standard had been settled on, Bharati braille, which has since been adopted by Sri Lanka, Nepal, and Bangladesh. There are slight differences in the orthographies for Nepali in India and Nepal, and for Tamil in India and Sri Lanka. There are significant differences in Bengali Braille between India and Bangladesh, with several letters differing. Pakistan has not adopted Bharati Braille, so the Urdu Braille of Pakistan is an entirely different alphabet than the Urdu Braille of India, with their commonalities largely due to their common inheritance from English or International Braille. Sinhala Braille largely conforms to other Bharati, but differs significantly toward the end of the alphabet.

Bharati braille alphabets use a 6-dot cell with values based largely on English Braille. Letters are assigned as consistently as possible across the various regional scripts of India as they are transliterated in the Latin script, so that, for example, Hindi, Urdu, Bengali, and English are rendered largely the same in braille.

== System ==
Although basically alphabetic, Bharati braille retains one aspect of Indian abugidas, in that the default vowel a is not written unless it occurs at the beginning of a syllable or before a vowel. This has been called a "linearized alphasyllabary abugida". For example, and taking Devanagari as a representative printed script, the braille letter ⠅ (the consonant K) renders print क ka, and braille ⠹ (TH) renders print थ tha. To indicate that a consonant occurs without a following vowel (as when followed by another consonant, or at the end of a syllable), a virama (vowel-canceling) prefix is used: ⠈⠅ (virama-K) is क k, and ⠈⠹ (virama-TH) is थ th. However, unlike in print, there are no vowel diacritics in Bharati braille; vowels are written as full letters following the consonant, regardless of their order in print. For example, in print the vowel i is prefixed to a consonant in a reduced diacritic form, कि ki, but in braille it follows the consonant in its full form: ⠅⠊ (K-I), equivalent to writing ⟨कइ⟩ for ki in print. Thus print क्लिक klika is written in braille as ⠈⠅⠇⠊⠅ (virama-K-L-I-K). The one time a non-initial short a is written in braille is when it is followed by another vowel. In this environment the a must be written, because otherwise the subsequent vowel will be read as following the consonant immediately. Thus print ⟨कइ⟩ kai is rendered in braille as ⠅⠁⠊ (K–A–I), to disambiguate it from ⠅⠊ for कि ki.

Apart from the kṣ and jñ, Bharati braille does not handle conjuncts. Consonant clusters written as conjuncts in print are handled with the virama in braille, just as they are with computer fonts that lack the conjuncts. Bharati braille is thus equivalent to Grade-1 English braille, though there are plans to extend all the Bharati alphabets to include conjuncts.

== Alphabet ==
Following are the charts of the braille correspondences of the main Indian scripts. Irregularities, where a letter does not match the romanized heading, are placed in parentheses.

| ISO | a | ā | i | ī | u | ū | e | ē | ai | o | ō | au |
|---|---|---|---|---|---|---|---|---|---|---|---|---|
| Braille | ⠁ (braille pattern dots-1) | ⠜ (braille pattern dots-345) | ⠊ (braille pattern dots-24) | ⠔ (braille pattern dots-35) | ⠥ (braille pattern dots-136) | ⠳ (braille pattern dots-1256) | ⠢ (braille pattern dots-26) | ⠑ (braille pattern dots-15) | ⠌ (braille pattern dots-34) | ⠭ (braille pattern dots-1346) | ⠕ (braille pattern dots-135) | ⠪ (braille pattern dots-246) |
| Gurmukhi | ਅ | ਆ | ਇ | ਈ | ਉ | ਊ | | ਏ | ਐ | (ਖ਼ x) | ਓ | ਔ |
| Urdu | | آ | | ی | | و | | ے | ے | (خ x) | و | و |
| Devanagari | अ | आ | इ | ई | उ | ऊ | ऎ | ए | ऐ | ऒ | ओ | औ |
| Devanagari | | ा | ि | ी | ु | ू | ॆ | े | ै | ॊ | ो | ौ |
| Gujarati | અ | આ | ઇ | ઈ | ઉ | ઊ | | એ | ઐ | | ઓ | ઔ |
| Bengali | অ | আ | ই | ঈ | উ | ঊ | (য় y) | এ | ঐ | | ও | ঔ |
| Odia | ଅ | ଆ | ଇ | ଈ | ଉ | ଊ | (ୟ ẏ) | ଏ | ଐ | | ଓ | ଔ |
| Telugu | అ | ఆ | ఇ | ఈ | ఉ | ఊ | ఎ | ఏ | ఐ | ఒ | ఓ | ఔ |
| Kannada | ಅ | ಆ | ಇ | ಈ | ಉ | ಊ | ಎ | ಏ | ಐ | ಒ | ಓ | ಔ |
| Malayalam | അ | ആ | ഇ | ഈ | ഉ | ഊ | എ | ഏ | ഐ | ഒ | ഓ | ഔ |
| Tamil | அ | ஆ | இ | ஈ | உ | ஊ | எ | ஏ | ஐ | ஒ | ஓ | ஔ |

| ISO | r̥ | r̥̄ | l̥ | l̥̄ |
|---|---|---|---|---|
| Braille | ⠐ (braille pattern dots-5) ⠗ (braille pattern dots-1235) | ⠠ (braille pattern dots-6) ⠗ (braille pattern dots-1235) | ⠐ (braille pattern dots-5) ⠇ (braille pattern dots-123) | ⠠ (braille pattern dots-6) ⠇ (braille pattern dots-123) |
| Devanagari | ऋ | ॠ | ऌ | ॡ |
| Devanagari | ृ | ॄ | ॢ | ॣ |
| Gujarati | ઋ | ૠ | | |
| Bengali | ঋ | | ঌ | |
| Odia | ଋ | ୠ | ଌ | ୡ |
| Telugu | ఋ | ౠ | ఌ | ౡ |
| Kannada | ಋ | ೠ | | |
| Malayalam | ഋ | ൠ | ഌ | ൡ |

| ISO | k | kh | g | gh | ṅ |
|---|---|---|---|---|---|
| Braille | ⠅ (braille pattern dots-13) | ⠨ (braille pattern dots-46) | ⠛ (braille pattern dots-1245) | ⠣ (braille pattern dots-126) | ⠬ (braille pattern dots-346) |
| Gurmukhi | ਕ | ਖ | ਗ | ਘ | ਙ |
| Urdu | ک | کھ | گ | گھ | |
| Devanagari | क | ख | ग | घ | ङ |
| Gujarati | ક | ખ | ગ | ઘ | ઙ |
| Bengali | ক | খ | গ | ঘ | ঙ |
| Odia | କ | ଖ | ଗ | ଘ | ଙ |
| Telugu | క | ఖ | గ | ఘ | ఙ |
| Kannada | ಕ | ಖ | ಗ | ಘ | ಙ |
| Malayalam | ക | ഖ | ഗ | ഘ | ങ |
| Tamil | க | | | | ங |

| ISO | c | ch | j | jh | ñ |
|---|---|---|---|---|---|
| Braille | ⠉ (braille pattern dots-14) | ⠡ (braille pattern dots-16) | ⠚ (braille pattern dots-245) | ⠴ (braille pattern dots-356) | ⠒ (braille pattern dots-25) |
| Gurmukhi | ਚ | ਛ | ਜ | ਝ | ਞ |
| Urdu | چ | چھ | ج | جھ | |
| Devanagari | च | छ | ज | झ | ञ |
| Gujarati | ચ | છ | જ | ઝ | ઞ |
| Bengali | চ | ছ | জ | ঝ | ঞ |
| Odia | ଚ | ଛ | ଜ | ଝ | ଞ |
| Telugu | చ | ఛ | జ | ఝ | ఞ |
| Kannada | ಚ | ಛ | ಜ | ಝ | ಞ |
| Malayalam | ച | ഛ | ജ | ഝ | ഞ |
| Tamil | ச | | ஜ | | ஞ |

| ISO | ṭ | ṭh | ḍ | ḍh | ṇ |
|---|---|---|---|---|---|
| Braille | ⠾ (braille pattern dots-23456) | ⠺ (braille pattern dots-2456) | ⠫ (braille pattern dots-1246) | ⠿ (braille pattern dots-123456) | ⠼ (braille pattern dots-3456) |
| Gurmukhi | ਟ | ਠ | ਡ | ਢ | ਣ |
| Urdu | ٹ | ٹھ | ڈ | ڈھ | |
| Devanagari | ट | ठ | ड | ढ | ण |
| Gujarati | ટ | ઠ | ડ | ઢ | ણ |
| Bengali | ট | ঠ | ড | ঢ | ণ |
| Odia | ଟ | ଠ | ଡ | ଢ | ଣ |
| Telugu | ట | ఠ | డ | ఢ | ణ |
| Kannada | ಟ | ಠ | ಡ | ಢ | ಣ |
| Malayalam | ട | ഠ | ഡ | ഢ | ണ |
| Tamil | ட | | | | ண |

| ISO | t | th | d | dh | n |
|---|---|---|---|---|---|
| Braille | ⠞ (braille pattern dots-2345) | ⠹ (braille pattern dots-1456) | ⠙ (braille pattern dots-145) | ⠮ (braille pattern dots-2346) | ⠝ (braille pattern dots-1345) |
| Gurmukhi | ਤ | ਥ | ਦ | ਧ | ਨ |
| Urdu | ت | تھ | د | دھ | ن |
| Devanagari | त | थ | द | ध | न |
| Gujarati | ત | થ | દ | ધ | ન |
| Bengali | ত | থ | দ | ধ | ন |
| Odia | ତ | ଥ | ଦ | ଧ | ନ |
| Telugu | త | థ | ద | ధ | న |
| Kannada | ತ | ಥ | ದ | ಧ | ನ |
| Malayalam | ത | ഥ | ദ | ധ | ന |
| Tamil | த | | | | ந |

| ISO | p | ph | b | bh | m |
|---|---|---|---|---|---|
| Braille | ⠏ (braille pattern dots-1234) | ⠖ (braille pattern dots-235) | ⠃ (braille pattern dots-12) | ⠘ (braille pattern dots-45) | ⠍ (braille pattern dots-134) |
| Gurmukhi | ਪ | ਫ | ਬ | ਭ | ਮ |
| Urdu | پ | پھ | ب | بھ | م |
| Devanagari | प | फ | ब | भ | म |
| Gujarati | પ | ફ | બ | ભ | મ |
| Bengali | প | ফ | ব | ভ | ম |
| Odia | ପ | ଫ | ବ | ଭ | ମ |
| Telugu | ప | ఫ | బ | భ | మ |
| Kannada | ಪ | ಫ | ಬ | ಭ | ಮ |
| Malayalam | പ | ഫ | ബ | ഭ | മ |
| Tamil | ப | | | | ம |

| ISO | y | r | l | ḷ | v |
|---|---|---|---|---|---|
| Braille | ⠽ (braille pattern dots-13456) | ⠗ (braille pattern dots-1235) | ⠇ (braille pattern dots-123) | ⠸ (braille pattern dots-456) | ⠧ (braille pattern dots-1236) |
| Gurmukhi | ਯ | ਰ | ਲ | ਲ਼ | ਵ |
| Urdu | ی | ر | ل | | و |
| Devanagari | य | र | ल | ळ | व |
| Gujarati | ય | ર | લ | ળ | વ |
| Bengali | য | র/ৰ | ল | | ৱ |
| Odia | ଯ | ର | ଳ | ଲ | ୱ/ଵ |
| Telugu | య | ర | ల | ళ | వ |
| Kannada | ಯ | ರ | ಲ | ಳ | ವ |
| Malayalam | യ | ര | ല | ള | വ |
| Tamil | ய | ர | ல | ள | வ |

| ISO | ś | ṣ | s | h |
|---|---|---|---|---|
| Braille | ⠩ (braille pattern dots-146) | ⠯ (braille pattern dots-12346) | ⠎ (braille pattern dots-234) | ⠓ (braille pattern dots-125) |
| Gurmukhi | ਸ਼ | | ਸ | ਹ |
| Urdu | ش | ص | س | ہ |
| Devanagari | श | ष | स | ह |
| Gujarati | શ | ષ | સ | હ |
| Bengali | শ | ষ | স | হ |
| Odia | ଶ | ଷ | ସ | ହ |
| Telugu | శ | ష | స | హ |
| Kannada | ಶ | ಷ | ಸ | ಹ |
| Malayalam | ശ | ഷ | സ | ഹ |
| Tamil | ஶ | ஷ | ஸ | ஹ |

| ISO | kṣ | jñ | ṛ/ṟ | ṛh | ḻ | ṉ | f | z |
|---|---|---|---|---|---|---|---|---|
| Braille | ⠟ (braille pattern dots-12345) | ⠱ (braille pattern dots-156) | ⠻ (braille pattern dots-12456) | ⠐ (braille pattern dots-5) ⠻ (braille pattern dots-12456) | ⠷ (braille pattern dots-12356) | ⠰ (braille pattern dots-56) | ⠋ (braille pattern dots-124) | ⠵ (braille pattern dots-1356) |
| Gurmukhi | | | ੜ | | | | ਫ਼ | ਜ਼ |
| Urdu | (ق q) | (ح ḥ) | ڑ | ڑھ | (ع ʿ) | | ف | ز |
| Devanagari | क्ष | ज्ञ | ड़ | ढ़ | | | फ़ | ज़ |
| Gujarati | ક્ષ | જ્ઞ | | | | | | |
| Bengali | ক্ষ | জ্ঞ | ড় | ঢ় | | | | |
| Odia | କ୍ଷ | ଜ୍ଞ | ଡ଼ | ଢ଼ | | | | |
| Telugu | క్ష | | ఱ | | | | | |
| Kannada | ಕ್ಷ | | ಱ | | ೞ | | | |
| Malayalam | ക്ഷ | ജ്ഞ | റ | | ഴ | ഩ | | |
| Tamil | க்ஷ | | ற | | ழ | ன | | |

=== Codas ===
Diacritics shown on the letter ka
| ISO | Halant | Anusvara | Visarga | Candrabindu | Avagraha |
|---|---|---|---|---|---|
| Braille | ⠈ (braille pattern dots-4) | ⠰ (braille pattern dots-56) | ⠠ (braille pattern dots-6) | ⠄ (braille pattern dots-3) | ⠂ (braille pattern dots-2) |
| Gurmukhi | ਕ੍ | ਕਂ | ਕਃ | ਕਁ | |
| Urdu | | ں | | | |
| Devanagari | क् | कं | कः | कँ | कऽ |
| Gujarati | ક્ | કં | કઃ | કઁ | કઽ |
| Bengali | ক্ | কং | কঃ | কঁ | কঽ |
| Odia | କ୍ | କଂ | କଃ | କଁ | କଽ |
| Telugu | క్ | కం | కః | కఁ | కఽ |
| Kannada | ಕ್ | ಕಂ | ಕಃ | | |
| Malayalam | ക് | കം | കഃ | കഁ | കഽ |
| Tamil | க் | | ஃ | | |

In Hindi (written in Devanagari), halanta is not used with the last letter when a word ends in a consonant.

== Punctuation ==
Some of the punctuation marks (comma, close quote) duplicate letters. The caps mark is only used when transcribing English.

| Punctuation | Comma / Apostrophe | | ; | : | । (danda) | ॥ (double danda) | ! | ? / Open quote | Close quote |
|---|---|---|---|---|---|---|---|---|---|
| Braille | ⠂ (braille pattern dots-2) | | ⠆ (braille pattern dots-23) | ⠒ (braille pattern dots-25) | ⠲ (braille pattern dots-256) | ⠲ (braille pattern dots-256) | ⠖ (braille pattern dots-235) | ⠦ (braille pattern dots-236) | ⠴ (braille pattern dots-356) |
| Punctuation | Accent | Hyphen | Dash | | Pointing | Asterisk | Italics | ( ) | |
| Braille | ⠈ (braille pattern dots-4) | ⠤ (braille pattern dots-36) | ⠤ (braille pattern dots-36) | | ⠐ (braille pattern dots-5) | ⠔ (braille pattern dots-35) | ⠨ (braille pattern dots-46) | ... | |

The 'accent', ⠈, transcribes Urdu ّ shaddah (tashdeed), and the colon, ⠒, is also used for Urdu ة ta marbuta.

In Bangladesh and Nepal, several additional punctuation marks are noted, but they do not agree with each other. It is not clear which are used in India. (See Bengali Braille and Nepali Braille.)

=== Pointing and Urdu ===
The pointing symbol, ⠐, is used for consonant letters that in print are derived by adding a dot to another consonant. For Urdu, the base letter in Devanagari is used: the pointing of the Arabic/Persian script is not reflected. For example, Gurmukhi ਗ਼ / Urdu غ / Devanagari ग़ ġa [ɣ], formed by adding a dot to g in Gurmukhi and Devanagari, is written ⠐⠛ point-G in all three. With Urdu, this is only done in India.

=== Other languages ===
Ethnologue 17 reports braille usage for Mizo, Garo, and Meitei. It is not clear if these are obsolete alphabets, or if they have been unified with Bharati Braille.

== Digits ==
Digits follow international conventions and are marked by ⠼.

== See also ==
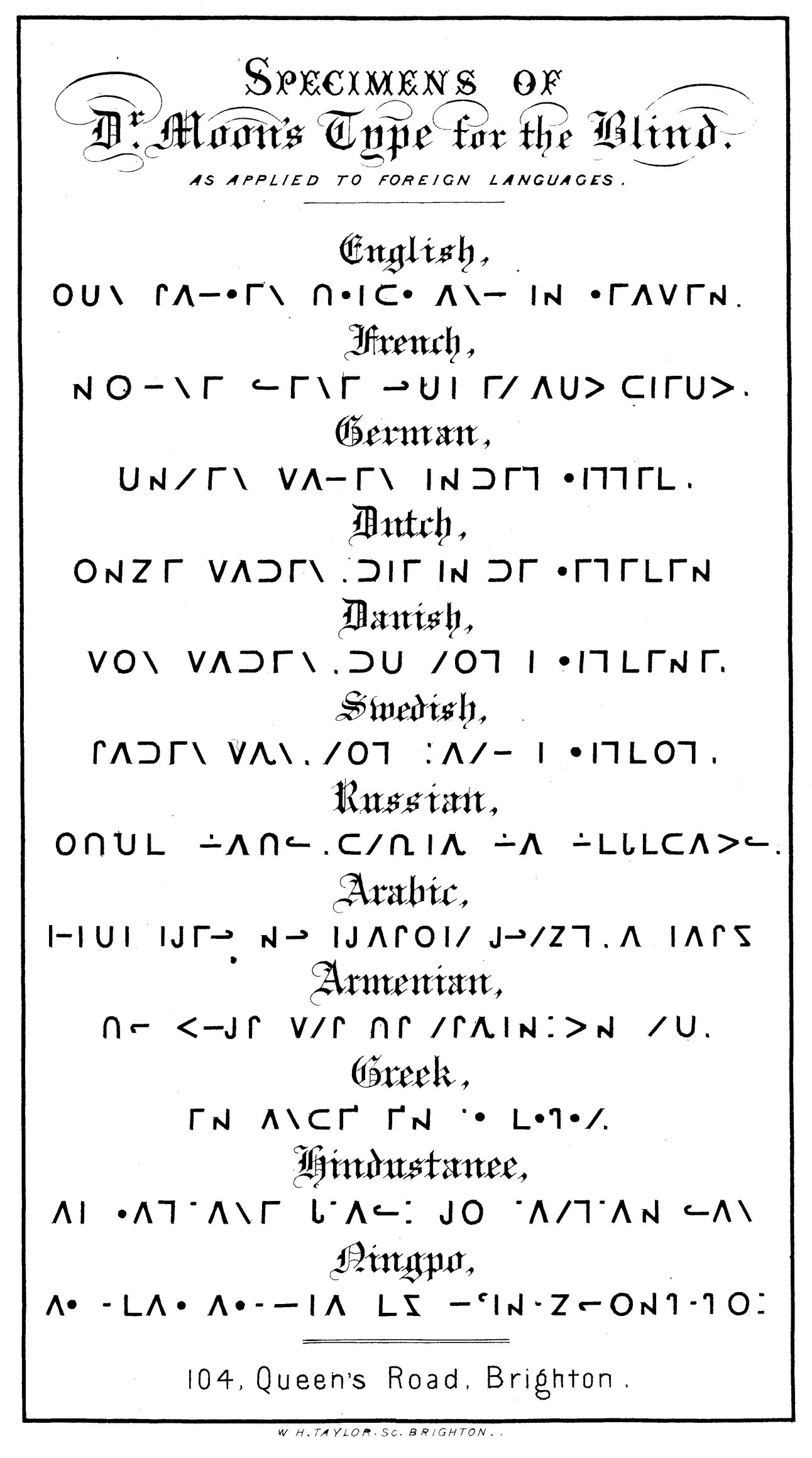
A sample of Moon type in various languages including "Hindustanee"

- Moon type is a simplification of the Latin alphabet for embossing. An adaptation for "Hindustanee"-reading blind people as proposed.
