= Telugu Braille =

Bharati braille alphabet

- Script type: Alphabet
- Print basis: Telugu alphabet
- Languages: Telugu language

Related scripts
- Parent systems: Braille: English Braille; Bharati Braille; Telugu Braille
- Indic

Telugu Braille is one of the Bharati braille alphabets, and it largely conforms to the letter values of the other Bharati alphabets.

== Alphabet ==
The alphabet is as follows. Vowel letters are used rather than diacritics, and they occur after consonants in their spoken order. For orthographic conventions, see Bharati Braille.

Print	అ	ఆ	ఇ	ఈ	ఉ	ఊ	ఎ	ఏ	ఐ	ఒ	ఓ	ఔ
ISO	a	ā	i	ī	u	ū	e	ē	ai	o	ō	au
Braille	⠁ (braille pattern dots-1)	⠜ (braille pattern dots-345)	⠊ (braille pattern dots-24)	⠔ (braille pattern dots-35)	⠥ (braille pattern dots-136)	⠳ (braille pattern dots-1256)	⠢ (braille pattern dots-26)	⠑ (braille pattern dots-15)	⠌ (braille pattern dots-34)	⠭ (braille pattern dots-1346)	⠕ (braille pattern dots-135)	⠪ (braille pattern dots-246)

Print	ఋ	ౠ	ఌ	ౡ
ISO	r̥	r̥̄	l̥	l̥̄
Braille	⠐ (braille pattern dots-5) ⠗ (braille pattern dots-1235)	⠠ (braille pattern dots-6) ⠗ (braille pattern dots-1235)	⠐ (braille pattern dots-5) ⠇ (braille pattern dots-123)	⠠ (braille pattern dots-6) ⠇ (braille pattern dots-123)

Print	క	ఖ	గ	ఘ	ఙ
ISO	k	kh	g	gh	ṅ
Braille	⠅ (braille pattern dots-13)	⠨ (braille pattern dots-46)	⠛ (braille pattern dots-1245)	⠣ (braille pattern dots-126)	⠬ (braille pattern dots-346)

Print	చ	ఛ	జ	ఝ	ఞ
ISO	c	ch	j	jh	ñ
Braille	⠉ (braille pattern dots-14)	⠡ (braille pattern dots-16)	⠚ (braille pattern dots-245)	⠴ (braille pattern dots-356)	⠒ (braille pattern dots-25)

Print	ట	ఠ	డ	ఢ	ణ
ISO	ṭ	ṭh	ḍ	ḍh	ṇ
Braille	⠾ (braille pattern dots-23456)	⠺ (braille pattern dots-2456)	⠫ (braille pattern dots-1246)	⠿ (braille pattern dots-123456)	⠼ (braille pattern dots-3456)

Print	త	థ	ద	ధ	న
ISO	t	th	d	dh	n
Braille	⠞ (braille pattern dots-2345)	⠹ (braille pattern dots-1456)	⠙ (braille pattern dots-145)	⠮ (braille pattern dots-2346)	⠝ (braille pattern dots-1345)

Print	ప	ఫ	బ	భ	మ
ISO	p	ph	b	bh	m
Braille	⠏ (braille pattern dots-1234)	⠖ (braille pattern dots-235)	⠃ (braille pattern dots-12)	⠘ (braille pattern dots-45)	⠍ (braille pattern dots-134)

Print	య	ర	ల	ళ	వ
ISO	y	r	l	ḷ	v
Braille	⠽ (braille pattern dots-13456)	⠗ (braille pattern dots-1235)	⠇ (braille pattern dots-123)	⠸ (braille pattern dots-456)	⠧ (braille pattern dots-1236)

Print	శ	ష	స	హ	ఱ
ISO	ś	ṣ	s	h	ṛ
Braille	⠩ (braille pattern dots-146)	⠯ (braille pattern dots-12346)	⠎ (braille pattern dots-234)	⠓ (braille pattern dots-125)	⠻ (braille pattern dots-12456)

There is a single pre-formed conjunct,

Print	క్ష
ISO	kṣ
Braille	⠟ (braille pattern dots-12345)

and the full range of syllable codas,

Print	క్	కం	కః	కఁ	కఽ
ISO	Halant	ṃ	ḥ	n̆	Avagraha
Braille	⠈ (braille pattern dots-4)	⠰ (braille pattern dots-56)	⠠ (braille pattern dots-6)	⠄ (braille pattern dots-3)	⠂ (braille pattern dots-2)

== Punctuation ==
See Bharati Braille#Punctuation.
