= Odia Braille =

Bharati braille alphabet

- Script type: Alphabet
- Print basis: Odia script
- Languages: Odia language

Related scripts
- Parent systems: Braille: English Braille; Bharati Braille; Odia Braille
- Indic

Odia Braille is one of the Bharati braille alphabets. Apart from using Hindi æ for Odia ẏ, it conforms to the letter values of the other Bharati scripts.

== Alphabet ==
The alphabet is as follows. Vowel letters are used rather than diacritics, and they occur after consonants in their spoken order. For orthographic conventions, see Bharati Braille.

Print	ଅ	ଆ	ଇ	ଈ	ଉ	ଊ	ଏ	ଐ	ଓ	ଔ
ISO	a	ā	i	ī	u	ū	e	ai	o	au
Braille	⠁ (braille pattern dots-1)	⠜ (braille pattern dots-345)	⠊ (braille pattern dots-24)	⠔ (braille pattern dots-35)	⠥ (braille pattern dots-136)	⠳ (braille pattern dots-1256)	⠑ (braille pattern dots-15)	⠌ (braille pattern dots-34)	⠕ (braille pattern dots-135)	⠪ (braille pattern dots-246)

Print	ଋ	ୠ	ଌ	ୡ
ISO	r̥	r̥̄	l̥	l̥̄
Braille	⠐ (braille pattern dots-5) ⠗ (braille pattern dots-1235)	⠠ (braille pattern dots-6) ⠗ (braille pattern dots-1235)	⠐ (braille pattern dots-5) ⠇ (braille pattern dots-123)	⠠ (braille pattern dots-6) ⠇ (braille pattern dots-123)

Print	କ	ଖ	ଗ	ଘ	ଙ
ISO	k	kh	g	gh	ṅ
Braille	⠅ (braille pattern dots-13)	⠨ (braille pattern dots-46)	⠛ (braille pattern dots-1245)	⠣ (braille pattern dots-126)	⠬ (braille pattern dots-346)

Print	ଚ	ଛ	ଜ	ଝ	ଞ
ISO	c	ch	j	jh	ñ
Braille	⠉ (braille pattern dots-14)	⠡ (braille pattern dots-16)	⠚ (braille pattern dots-245)	⠴ (braille pattern dots-356)	⠒ (braille pattern dots-25)

Print	ଟ	ଠ	ଡ	ଢ	ଡ଼	ଢ଼	ଣ
ISO	ṭ	ṭh	ḍ	ḍh	ṛ	ṛh	ṇ
Braille	⠾ (braille pattern dots-23456)	⠺ (braille pattern dots-2456)	⠫ (braille pattern dots-1246)	⠿ (braille pattern dots-123456)	⠻ (braille pattern dots-12456)	⠐ (braille pattern dots-5) ⠻ (braille pattern dots-12456)	⠼ (braille pattern dots-3456)

Print	ତ	ଥ	ଦ	ଧ	ନ
ISO	t	th	d	dh	n
Braille	⠞ (braille pattern dots-2345)	⠹ (braille pattern dots-1456)	⠙ (braille pattern dots-145)	⠮ (braille pattern dots-2346)	⠝ (braille pattern dots-1345)

Print	ପ	ଫ	ବ	ଭ	ମ
ISO	p	ph	b	bh	m
Braille	⠏ (braille pattern dots-1234)	⠖ (braille pattern dots-235)	⠃ (braille pattern dots-12)	⠘ (braille pattern dots-45)	⠍ (braille pattern dots-134)

Print	ଯ	ୟ	ର	ଳ	ଲ	ୱ/ଵ
ISO	y	ẏ	r	l	ḷ	v
Braille	⠽ (braille pattern dots-13456)	⠢ (braille pattern dots-26)	⠗ (braille pattern dots-1235)	⠇ (braille pattern dots-123)	⠸ (braille pattern dots-456)	⠧ (braille pattern dots-1236)

Print	ଶ	ଷ	ସ	ହ
ISO	ś	ṣ	s	h
Braille	⠩ (braille pattern dots-146)	⠯ (braille pattern dots-12346)	⠎ (braille pattern dots-234)	⠓ (braille pattern dots-125)

There are two pre-formed conjuncts,

Print	କ୍ଷ	ଜ୍ଞ
ISO	kṣ	jñ
Braille	⠟ (braille pattern dots-12345)	⠱ (braille pattern dots-156)

and the full range of syllable codas,

Print	କ୍	କଂ	କଃ	କଁ	କଽ
ISO	Halant	Anusvara	Visarga	Candrabindu	Avagraha
Braille	⠈ (braille pattern dots-4)	⠰ (braille pattern dots-56)	⠠ (braille pattern dots-6)	⠄ (braille pattern dots-3)	⠂ (braille pattern dots-2)

== Punctuation ==
See Bharati Braille#Punctuation.
