= Sinhala Braille =

Braille system for the Sinhala language

Sinhala Braille Sinhalese Braille
- Script type: Alphabet
- Print basis: Sinhala script
- Languages: Sinhala

Related scripts
- Parent systems: Braille: English Braille; Bharati Braille; Sinhala Braille
- Indic

Sinhala Braille is one of the many Bharati braille alphabets. While it largely conforms to the letter values of other Bharati alphabets, it diverges in the values of the letters assigned toward the end of those alphabets.

== Introduction ==
Sinhala braille just as any other braille code is used in education and a vast range of literature whether it be for information, pleasure or commercial purposes.

The blind community of Sri Lanka is alienating gradually from the use of braille due to a number of reasons. A recent survey reveals that only 15% of blind people use braille. Today, braille usage is limited to examination purposes in educational institutions. It is worth inquiring as to what could be the possible reasons leading to this alienation from braille.

However, the key factor is issues related to the Sinhala braille code. Current Sinhala braille code has its own shortcomings, the main drawback being the lack of an efficient set of standard contractions. It is important that contractions are created for Sinhala braille as braille books are large, bulky and often come in multiple volumes and, in general, lack the convenience of portability that we find in a sighted print paperback book. Users who have been exposed to grade 2 English braille realise the importance of establishing a set of standard contractions for Sinhala Braille as well. Care must be taken to create contractions which are appropriate for the present day learners of braille and not complicated and difficult to use.

== History ==
Education for the blind started in 1912 when Mary F. Chapman, a missionary lady founded a special school for the deaf and blind at Ratmalana. The use of Sinhala braille too runs as far as the beginning of the 20th century. At the beginning, English characters were used to represent Sinhala letters. The Sinhala alphabet comprises 60 letters whereas English has only 26. Moreover, Sinhala has a syllable based alphabet and two English characters had to be used to represent one Sinhala consonant, thus distorting the semblance to sighted print. Therefore, this method was not practical although many users continued to use it as there was no alternative at the time.

In 1947, the first non-foreign principal of the school for the blind at Ratmalana, Kingsley C. Dassanaike, introduced a more practical code which was influenced by the principles and practices of the English braille code. Since then, Sinhala braille has played a significant role in education and communication. Nevertheless, a grade 2 or braille contraction code had not yet been adapted for Sinhala braille, causing lot of inconvenience in using and storing braille material.

Several attempts were made in 1959, 1968 and 1997 to introduce Sinhala braille contractions. But, none of these attempts can be observed today.

The contractions introduced in 1959, were mere shortening of long words. Sufficient consideration was not given to the structure of the Sinhala language. Although, the structure of the language was taken into consideration in contractions introduced in 1968, users were reluctant to accept it as there were mainly morphological issues. A large amount of words were contracted in 1997, but it too received the same fate because, some of the contractions were illogical.

In addition to these attempts, most braille users use their own personal methods of contractions. But, these personal ways of contractions have been confined only to them and have not being standardised. To remedy this, a standard braille contraction system should be adapted for Sinhala braille soon. This will certainly result in increasing the productivity of the blind and thus it will make Sinhala braille more popular.

== Alphabet ==
Although Sinhala Braille was adopted from Bharati Braille, several letters toward the end of the Bharati alphabet (in the row of 'extra' letters) have been reassigned in Sinhala: ⠟ (Bharati kṣ) is used for Sinhala ඥ gn (Sanskrit jñ), ⠱ (Bharati jñ) for Sinhala ඵ ph, ⠷ (Bharati ḻ) for Sinhala ඇ æ, ⠻ (Bharati ṟ) for Sinhala ඈ ǣ, and ⠵ (Bharati z) for Sinhala ණ ṇ.

In addition, the pairs of letters e/ē and ś/ṣ have interchanged braille values from what one would expect from other Bharati alphabets, and the syllable codas (last row below) are mostly innovative. Punctuation and the digits, however, are as in the rest of Bharati braille. Also as in other Bharati alphabets, letters rather than diacritics are used for vowels, and they occur after consonants in their spoken order.

Print	අ	ආ	ඇ	ඈ	ඉ	ඊ	උ	ඌ	එ	ඒ	ඓ	ඔ	ඕ	ඖ
ISO	a	ā	æ	ǣ	i	ī	u	ū	e	ē	ai	o	ō	au
Braille	⠁ (braille pattern dots-1)	⠜ (braille pattern dots-345)	⠷ (braille pattern dots-12356)	⠻ (braille pattern dots-12456)	⠊ (braille pattern dots-24)	⠔ (braille pattern dots-35)	⠥ (braille pattern dots-136)	⠳ (braille pattern dots-1256)	⠑ (braille pattern dots-15)	⠢ (braille pattern dots-26)	⠌ (braille pattern dots-34)	⠭ (braille pattern dots-1346)	⠕ (braille pattern dots-135)	⠪ (braille pattern dots-246)

Print	ඍ	ඎ	ඏ	ඐ
ISO	ṛ	ṝ	ḷ	ḹ
Braille	⠐ (braille pattern dots-5) ⠗ (braille pattern dots-1235)	⠠ (braille pattern dots-6) ⠗ (braille pattern dots-1235)	⠐ (braille pattern dots-5) ⠇ (braille pattern dots-123)	⠠ (braille pattern dots-6) ⠇ (braille pattern dots-123)

Print	ක	ඛ	ග	ඝ	ඞා	ච	ඡ	ජ	ඣ	ඤ
ISO	k	kh	g	gh	ṅ	c	ch	j	jh	ñ
Braille	⠅ (braille pattern dots-13)	⠨ (braille pattern dots-46)	⠛ (braille pattern dots-1245)	⠣ (braille pattern dots-126)	⠬ (braille pattern dots-346)	⠉ (braille pattern dots-14)	⠡ (braille pattern dots-16)	⠚ (braille pattern dots-245)	⠴ (braille pattern dots-356)	⠒ (braille pattern dots-25)

Print	ට	ඨ	ඩ	ඪ	ණ	ත	ථ	ද	ධ	න
ISO	ṭ	ṭh	ḍ	ḍh	ṇ	t	th	d	dh	n
Braille	⠾ (braille pattern dots-23456)	⠺ (braille pattern dots-2456)	⠫ (braille pattern dots-1246)	⠿ (braille pattern dots-123456)	⠵ (braille pattern dots-1356)	⠞ (braille pattern dots-2345)	⠹ (braille pattern dots-1456)	⠙ (braille pattern dots-145)	⠮ (braille pattern dots-2346)	⠝ (braille pattern dots-1345)

Print	ප	ඵ	බ	භ	ම	ය	ර	ල	ළ	ව
ISO	p	ph	b	bh	m	y	r	l	ḷ	v
Braille	⠏ (braille pattern dots-1234)	⠱ (braille pattern dots-156)	⠃ (braille pattern dots-12)	⠘ (braille pattern dots-45)	⠍ (braille pattern dots-134)	⠽ (braille pattern dots-13456)	⠗ (braille pattern dots-1235)	⠇ (braille pattern dots-123)	⠸ (braille pattern dots-456)	⠧ (braille pattern dots-1236)

Print	ශ	ෂ	ස	හ	ඥ	ෆ
ISO	ś	ṣ	s	h	gn	f
Braille	⠯ (braille pattern dots-12346)	⠩ (braille pattern dots-146)	⠎ (braille pattern dots-234)	⠓ (braille pattern dots-125)	⠟ (braille pattern dots-12345)	⠋ (braille pattern dots-124)

=== Codas ===
Print	ක්	කං	කඃ	(see below)*
Diacritics	Halant	Anusvara	Visarga	Candrabindu
Braille	⠈ (braille pattern dots-4)	⠄ (braille pattern dots-3)	⠄ (braille pattern dots-3)	⠆ (braille pattern dots-23)

* In print Sinhala, this is indicated by an additional set of letters:

ඟ n̆ga ⠆⠛, ඬ n̆ḍa ⠆⠫, ඳ n̆da ⠆⠙, ඹ m̆ba ⠆⠃

== Punctuation ==
See Bharati Braille#Punctuation
