= Kannada Braille =

Braile alphabet of the Kannada language

- Script type: Alphabet
- Print basis: Kannada alphabet
- Languages: Kannada language

Related scripts
- Parent systems: Braille: English Braille; Bharati Braille; Kannada Braille
- Indic

Kannada Braille is one of the Bharati braille alphabets, and it largely conforms to the letter values of the other Bharati alphabets.

== Alphabet ==
The alphabet is as follows. Vowel letters are used rather than diacritics, and they occur after consonants in their spoken order. For orthographic conventions, see Bharati Braille.

Print	ಅ	ಆ	ಇ	ಈ	ಉ	ಊ	ಎ	ಏ	ಐ	ಒ	ಓ	ಔ
ISO	a	ā	i	ī	u	ū	e	ē	ai	o	ō	au
Braille	⠁ (braille pattern dots-1)	⠜ (braille pattern dots-345)	⠊ (braille pattern dots-24)	⠔ (braille pattern dots-35)	⠥ (braille pattern dots-136)	⠳ (braille pattern dots-1256)	⠢ (braille pattern dots-26)	⠑ (braille pattern dots-15)	⠌ (braille pattern dots-34)	⠭ (braille pattern dots-1346)	⠕ (braille pattern dots-135)	⠪ (braille pattern dots-246)

Print	ಋ	ೠ
ISO	r̥	r̥̄
Braille	⠐ (braille pattern dots-5) ⠗ (braille pattern dots-1235)	⠠ (braille pattern dots-6) ⠗ (braille pattern dots-1235)

Print	ಕ	ಖ	ಗ	ಘ	ಙ
ISO	k	kh	g	gh	ṅ
Braille	⠅ (braille pattern dots-13)	⠨ (braille pattern dots-46)	⠛ (braille pattern dots-1245)	⠣ (braille pattern dots-126)	⠬ (braille pattern dots-346)

Print	ಚ	ಛ	ಜ	ಝ	ಞ
ISO	c	ch	j	jh	ñ
Braille	⠉ (braille pattern dots-14)	⠡ (braille pattern dots-16)	⠚ (braille pattern dots-245)	⠴ (braille pattern dots-356)	⠒ (braille pattern dots-25)

Print	ಟ	ಠ	ಡ	ಢ	ಣ
ISO	ṭ	ṭh	ḍ	ḍh	ṇ
Braille	⠾ (braille pattern dots-23456)	⠺ (braille pattern dots-2456)	⠫ (braille pattern dots-1246)	⠿ (braille pattern dots-123456)	⠼ (braille pattern dots-3456)

Print	ತ	ಥ	ದ	ಧ	ನ
ISO	t	th	d	dh	n
Braille	⠞ (braille pattern dots-2345)	⠹ (braille pattern dots-1456)	⠙ (braille pattern dots-145)	⠮ (braille pattern dots-2346)	⠝ (braille pattern dots-1345)

Print	ಪ	ಫ	ಬ	ಭ	ಮ
ISO	p	ph	b	bh	m
Braille	⠏ (braille pattern dots-1234)	⠖ (braille pattern dots-235)	⠃ (braille pattern dots-12)	⠘ (braille pattern dots-45)	⠍ (braille pattern dots-134)

Print	ಯ	ರ	ಲ	ಳ	ವ
ISO	y	r	l	ḷ	v
Braille	⠽ (braille pattern dots-13456)	⠗ (braille pattern dots-1235)	⠇ (braille pattern dots-123)	⠸ (braille pattern dots-456)	⠧ (braille pattern dots-1236)

Print	ಶ	ಷ	ಸ	ಹ
ISO	ś	ṣ	s	h
Braille	⠩ (braille pattern dots-146)	⠯ (braille pattern dots-12346)	⠎ (braille pattern dots-234)	⠓ (braille pattern dots-125)

There is a single pre-formed conjunct, and two obsolete letters,

Print	ಕ್ಷ	ಱ	ೞ
ISO	kṣ	ṟ	ḻ
Braille	⠟ (braille pattern dots-12345)	⠻ (braille pattern dots-12456)	⠷ (braille pattern dots-12356)

and several syllable codas,

Print	ಕ್	ಕಂ	ಕಃ
ISO	Halant	Anusvara	Visarga
Braille	⠈ (braille pattern dots-4)	⠰ (braille pattern dots-56)	⠠ (braille pattern dots-6)

== Punctuation ==
See Bharati Braille#Punctuation.
