= Bhaiksuki script =

Brahmi-based script that uses Abugida writing system

Bhaiksuki 𑰥𑰹𑰎𑰿𑰬𑰲𑰎𑰱
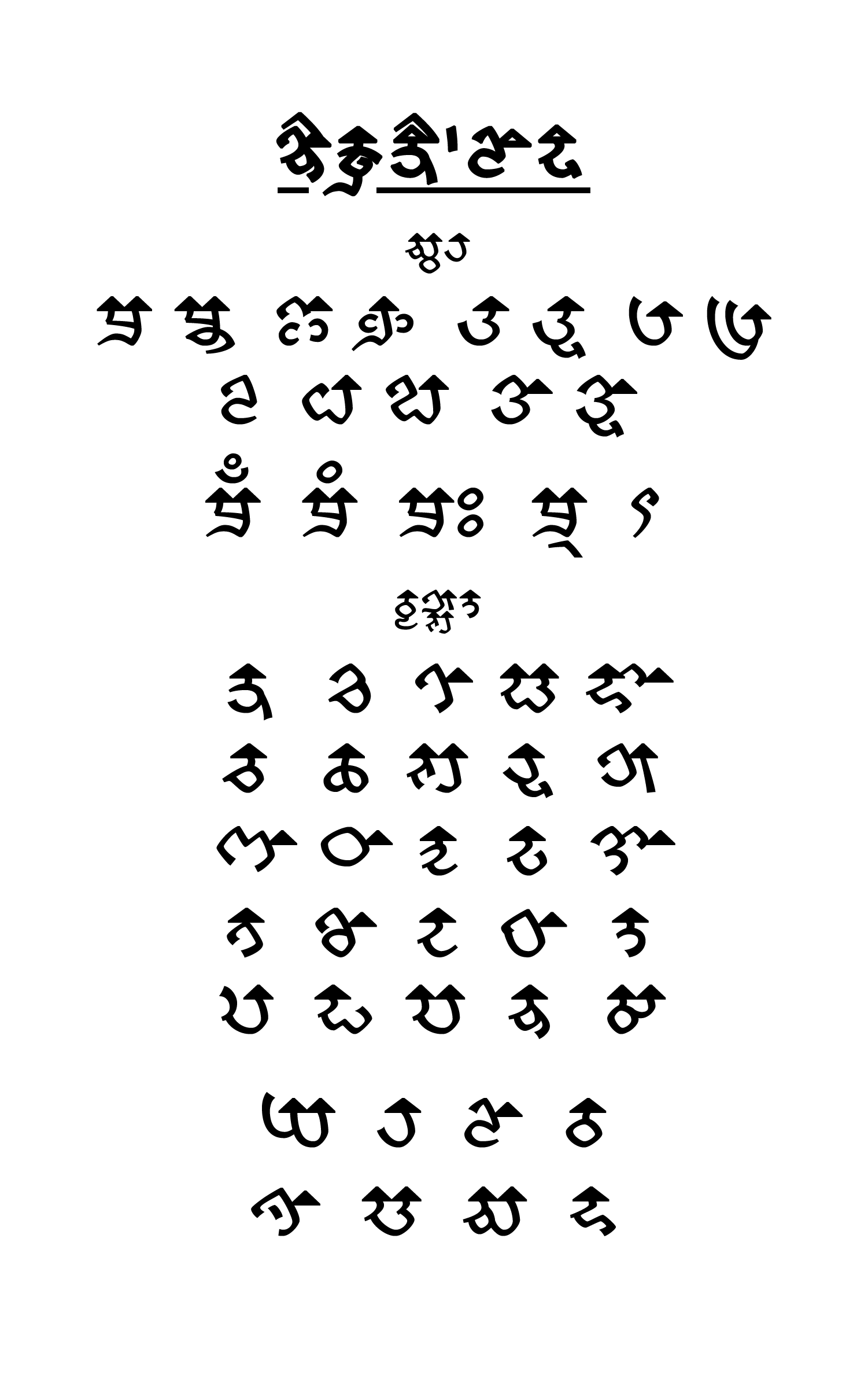
- Bhaiksuki Alphabet Chart
- Script type: abugida
- Period: c. 11th–12th century AD
- Direction: Left-to-right
- Region: Eastern India
- Languages: Sanskrit

Related scripts
- Parent systems: Egyptian: Proto-Sinaitic; Phoenician; Aramaic; Brahmi; Gupta; Bhaiksuki
- Sister systems: Sharada, Tibetan, Siddham, Kalinga

ISO 15924
- ISO 15924: Bhks (334), Bhaiksuki

Unicode
- Unicode alias: Bhaiksuki
- Unicode range: U+11C00–U+11C6F

Bhaiksuki (Sanskrit: भैक्षुकी, Bhaiksuki: 𑰥𑰹𑰎𑰿𑰬𑰲𑰎𑰱) is a Brahmi-based script that was used around the 11th and 12th centuries CE. It used to be known in English as the "Arrow-Headed Script" or "Point-Headed Script," while an older designation, "Sindhura," had been used in Tibet for at least three centuries. Records showing usage of the script mainly appeared in the present-day states of Bihar and West Bengal in India, and in regions of Bangladesh. Records have also been located in Tibet, Nepal, and Burma.

== Consonants ==
Consonant letters
𑰎 ka	𑰏 kha	𑰐 ga	𑰑 gha	𑰒 nga
𑰓 ca	𑰔 cha	𑰕 ja	𑰖 jha	𑰗 nya
𑰘 tta	𑰙 ttha	𑰚 dda	𑰛 ddha	𑰜 nna
𑰝 ta	𑰞 tha	𑰟 da	𑰠 dha	𑰡 na
𑰢 pa	𑰣 pha	𑰤 ba	𑰥 bha	𑰦 ma
𑰧 ya	𑰨 ra	𑰩 la	𑰪 va	
𑰫 sha	𑰬 ssa	𑰭 sa	𑰮 ha	

== Vowels ==
Vowels
Vowel	a	aa	i	ii	u	uu	vocalic r	vocalic rr	vocalic l
Independent	𑰀	𑰁	𑰂	𑰃	𑰄	𑰅	𑰆	𑰇	𑰈
Dependent		𑰯	𑰰	𑰱	𑰲	𑰳	𑰴	𑰵	𑰶

Vowel	e	ai	o	au
Independent	𑰊	𑰋	𑰌	𑰍
Dependent	𑰸	𑰹	𑰺	𑰻

== Other signs ==
Signs
𑰼 candrabindu	𑰽 anusvara	𑰾 visarga	𑰿 virama	𑱀 avagraha

Punctuations
𑱁 danda	𑱂 double danda	𑱃 word sep.	𑱄 gap filler	𑱅 gap filler

== Numerals ==
Digits
𑱐 0	𑱑 1	𑱒 2	𑱓 3	𑱔 4	𑱕 5	𑱖 6	𑱗 7	𑱘 8	𑱙 9

Numbers
𑱚 1	𑱛 2	𑱜 3	𑱝 4	𑱞 5	𑱟 6	𑱠 7	𑱡 8	𑱢 9
𑱣 10	𑱤 20	𑱥 30	𑱦 40	𑱧 50	𑱨 60	𑱩 70	𑱪 80	𑱫 90
𑱬 100

== Extant manuscripts ==
The word Bhaiksuki written in a modern font.

The script is found exclusively in Buddhist texts. According to the Unicode proposal, "Only eleven inscriptions and four manuscripts written in this script are known to exist. These are the Bhaiksuki manuscripts of the Abhidharmasamuccayakārikā, Maṇicūḍajātaka, Candrālaṃkāra, and at least one more Buddhist canonical text. The codices of the Abhidharmasamuccayakārikā and of the Maṇicūḍajātaka were once kept in the Tibetan monastery of Gonkhar, and were brought to Italy by Giuseppe Tucci in 1948. While the exact place of preservation of the Maṇicūḍajātaka is unknown, and only the photographs of the text are accessible, the codex of the Abhidharmasamuccayakārikā was rediscovered in Tucci's last home in 2014, and is now on display at the National Museum of Oriental Art in Rome. The fourth codex was discovered in Tibet and was recently shown in a Chinese documentary; however, information about this manuscript is limited."

Sanskrit is the main language written in this script. It is strongly related to the Devanagari and Sharada scripts.

== Unicode ==
The Bhaiksuki alphabet was added to the Unicode Standard in June, 2016 with the release of version 9.0.

The Unicode block for Bhaiksuki is U+11C00–U+11C6F:

Bhaiksuki^{[1]}^{[2]} Official Unicode Consortium code chart (PDF)
	0	1	2	3	4	5	6	7	8	9	A	B	C	D	E	F
U+11C0x	𑰀	𑰁	𑰂	𑰃	𑰄	𑰅	𑰆	𑰇	𑰈		𑰊	𑰋	𑰌	𑰍	𑰎	𑰏
U+11C1x	𑰐	𑰑	𑰒	𑰓	𑰔	𑰕	𑰖	𑰗	𑰘	𑰙	𑰚	𑰛	𑰜	𑰝	𑰞	𑰟
U+11C2x	𑰠	𑰡	𑰢	𑰣	𑰤	𑰥	𑰦	𑰧	𑰨	𑰩	𑰪	𑰫	𑰬	𑰭	𑰮	𑰯
U+11C3x	𑰰	𑰱	𑰲	𑰳	𑰴	𑰵	𑰶		𑰸	𑰹	𑰺	𑰻	𑰼	𑰽	𑰾	𑰿
U+11C4x	𑱀	𑱁	𑱂	𑱃	𑱄	𑱅										
U+11C5x	𑱐	𑱑	𑱒	𑱓	𑱔	𑱕	𑱖	𑱗	𑱘	𑱙	𑱚	𑱛	𑱜	𑱝	𑱞	𑱟
U+11C6x	𑱠	𑱡	𑱢	𑱣	𑱤	𑱥	𑱦	𑱧	𑱨	𑱩	𑱪	𑱫	𑱬			
Notes 1.As of Unicode version 17.0 2.Grey areas indicate non-assigned code points
