= Bengali Braille =

Braille system for Bengali

Bengali Braille বাংলা ব্রেইল Bangla Breil
- Script type: Alphabet
- Print basis: Bengali alphabet
- Languages: Bengali

Related scripts
- Parent systems: Night writing: Braille; English Braille; Bharati Braille; Bengali Braille

Bengali Braille is used for the Bengali language. According to UNESCO (2013), there are slight different braille conventions for Bengali language in India, where the generic Bharati Braille is followed, and in Bangladesh. This article compares Bengali Braille in the two countries. The braille characters by used in Bangladesh follows the English braille more closely, as per unification of braille alphabets. For example, the braille character for 'v' and 'ভ' is the same.

== Bengali Braille chart ==
=== Vowel Alphabets ===
Print	অ	আ	ই	ঈ	উ	ঊ	এ	ঐ	ও	ঔ	ঋ	ঌ
Bangladesh	⠁ (braille pattern dots-1)	⠜ (braille pattern dots-345)	⠊ (braille pattern dots-24)	⠔ (braille pattern dots-35)	⠥ (braille pattern dots-136)	⠳ (braille pattern dots-1256)	⠑ (braille pattern dots-15)	⠌ (braille pattern dots-34)	⠕ (braille pattern dots-135)	⠪ (braille pattern dots-246)	⠐ (braille pattern dots-5) ⠗ (braille pattern dots-1235)	-
India	⠁ (braille pattern dots-1)	⠜ (braille pattern dots-345)	⠊ (braille pattern dots-24)	⠔ (braille pattern dots-35)	⠥ (braille pattern dots-136)	⠳ (braille pattern dots-1256)	⠑ (braille pattern dots-15)	⠌ (braille pattern dots-34)	⠕ (braille pattern dots-135)	⠪ (braille pattern dots-246)	⠐ (braille pattern dots-5) ⠗ (braille pattern dots-1235)	⠐ (braille pattern dots-5) ⠇ (braille pattern dots-123)

=== Consonant Alphabets ===
Print	ক	খ	গ	ঘ	ঙ	চ	ছ	জ	ঝ	ঞ
Bangladesh	⠅ (braille pattern dots-13)	⠭ (braille pattern dots-1346)	⠛ (braille pattern dots-1245)	⠣ (braille pattern dots-126)	⠬ (braille pattern dots-346)	⠉ (braille pattern dots-14)	⠡ (braille pattern dots-16)	⠚ (braille pattern dots-245)	⠵ (braille pattern dots-1356)	⠒ (braille pattern dots-25)
India	⠅ (braille pattern dots-13)	⠨ (braille pattern dots-46)	⠛ (braille pattern dots-1245)	⠣ (braille pattern dots-126)	⠬ (braille pattern dots-346)	⠉ (braille pattern dots-14)	⠡ (braille pattern dots-16)	⠚ (braille pattern dots-245)	⠴ (braille pattern dots-356)	⠒ (braille pattern dots-25)

Print	ট	ঠ	ড	ঢ	ণ	ত	থ	দ	ধ	ন
Bangladesh & India	⠾ (braille pattern dots-23456)	⠺ (braille pattern dots-2456)	⠫ (braille pattern dots-1246)	⠿ (braille pattern dots-123456)	⠼ (braille pattern dots-3456)	⠞ (braille pattern dots-2345)	⠹ (braille pattern dots-1456)	⠙ (braille pattern dots-145)	⠮ (braille pattern dots-2346)	⠝ (braille pattern dots-1345)

Print	প	ফ	ব	ভ	ম	য	র	ল
Bangladesh	⠏ (braille pattern dots-1234)	⠖ (braille pattern dots-235)	⠃ (braille pattern dots-12)	⠧ (braille pattern dots-1236)	⠍ (braille pattern dots-134)	⠽ (braille pattern dots-13456)	⠗ (braille pattern dots-1235)	⠇ (braille pattern dots-123)
India	⠏ (braille pattern dots-1234)	⠖ (braille pattern dots-235)	⠃ (braille pattern dots-12)	⠘ (braille pattern dots-45)	⠍ (braille pattern dots-134)	⠽ (braille pattern dots-13456)	⠗ (braille pattern dots-1235)	⠇ (braille pattern dots-123)

Print	শ	ষ	স	হ	ক্ষ	জ্ঞ	ড়	ঢ়	য়	ৎ
Bangladesh	⠩ (braille pattern dots-146)	⠯ (braille pattern dots-12346)	⠎ (braille pattern dots-234)	⠓ (braille pattern dots-125)	⠟ (braille pattern dots-12345)	⠱ (braille pattern dots-156)	⠻ (braille pattern dots-12456)	⠷ (braille pattern dots-12356)	⠢ (braille pattern dots-26)	⠐ (braille pattern dots-5) ⠞ (braille pattern dots-2345)
India	⠩ (braille pattern dots-146)	⠯ (braille pattern dots-12346)	⠎ (braille pattern dots-234)	⠓ (braille pattern dots-125)	⠟ (braille pattern dots-12345)	⠱ (braille pattern dots-156)	⠻ (braille pattern dots-12456)	⠐ (braille pattern dots-5) ⠻ (braille pattern dots-12456)	⠢ (braille pattern dots-26)	(?)

=== Codas (Script modifiers) ===
Print	্	ং	ঃ	ঁ	ঽ	।	
Print	Bangladesh & India	⠈ (braille pattern dots-4)	⠰ (braille pattern dots-56)	⠠ (braille pattern dots-6)	⠄ (braille pattern dots-3)	⠂ (braille pattern dots-2)	⠲ (braille pattern dots-256)

=== Numerals ===
Bengali numerals	১	২	৩	৪	৫	৬	৭	৮	৯	০
Bangladesh & India	⠼ (braille pattern dots-3456) ⠁ (braille pattern dots-1)	⠼ (braille pattern dots-3456) ⠃ (braille pattern dots-12)	⠼ (braille pattern dots-3456) ⠉ (braille pattern dots-14)	⠼ (braille pattern dots-3456) ⠙ (braille pattern dots-145)	⠼ (braille pattern dots-3456) ⠑ (braille pattern dots-15)	⠼ (braille pattern dots-3456) ⠋ (braille pattern dots-124)	⠼ (braille pattern dots-3456) ⠛ (braille pattern dots-1245)	⠼ (braille pattern dots-3456) ⠓ (braille pattern dots-125)	⠼ (braille pattern dots-3456) ⠊ (braille pattern dots-24)	⠼ (braille pattern dots-3456) ⠚ (braille pattern dots-245)

=== Punctuation marks ===
Print	,	;	:	?	!	–	—
Bangladesh & India	⠂ (braille pattern dots-2)	⠆ (braille pattern dots-23)	⠒ (braille pattern dots-25)	⠦ (braille pattern dots-236)	⠖ (braille pattern dots-235)	⠤ (braille pattern dots-36)	⠤ (braille pattern dots-36)

Print	‘ ... ’	[ ... ]	/	*
Bangladesh & India	...	...	⠸ (braille pattern dots-456) ⠌ (braille pattern dots-34)	⠔ (braille pattern dots-35)

== See also ==
- Bharati braille
