= Bhaiksuki (Unicode block) =

- Range: U+11C00..U+11C6F (112 code points)
- Plane: SMP
- Scripts: Bhaiksuki
- Assigned: 97 code points
- Unused: 15 reserved code points

Unicode version history
- 9.0 (2016): 97 (+97)

Unicode documentation
- Code chart ∣ Web page

Bhaiksuki is a Unicode block containing characters from the Bhaiksuki alphabet, which is a Brahmi-based script that was used for writing Sanskrit during the 11th and 12th centuries CE, mainly in the present-day states of Bihar and West Bengal in India, and in parts of Bangladesh.

Bhaiksuki^{[1]}^{[2]} Official Unicode Consortium code chart (PDF)
	0	1	2	3	4	5	6	7	8	9	A	B	C	D	E	F
U+11C0x	𑰀	𑰁	𑰂	𑰃	𑰄	𑰅	𑰆	𑰇	𑰈		𑰊	𑰋	𑰌	𑰍	𑰎	𑰏
U+11C1x	𑰐	𑰑	𑰒	𑰓	𑰔	𑰕	𑰖	𑰗	𑰘	𑰙	𑰚	𑰛	𑰜	𑰝	𑰞	𑰟
U+11C2x	𑰠	𑰡	𑰢	𑰣	𑰤	𑰥	𑰦	𑰧	𑰨	𑰩	𑰪	𑰫	𑰬	𑰭	𑰮	𑰯
U+11C3x	𑰰	𑰱	𑰲	𑰳	𑰴	𑰵	𑰶		𑰸	𑰹	𑰺	𑰻	𑰼	𑰽	𑰾	𑰿
U+11C4x	𑱀	𑱁	𑱂	𑱃	𑱄	𑱅										
U+11C5x	𑱐	𑱑	𑱒	𑱓	𑱔	𑱕	𑱖	𑱗	𑱘	𑱙	𑱚	𑱛	𑱜	𑱝	𑱞	𑱟
U+11C6x	𑱠	𑱡	𑱢	𑱣	𑱤	𑱥	𑱦	𑱧	𑱨	𑱩	𑱪	𑱫	𑱬			
Notes: 1. As of Unicode version 17.0; 2. Grey areas indicate non-assigned code points

== History ==
The following Unicode-related documents record the purpose and process of defining specific characters in the Bhaiksuki block:

Version	Final code points (Note: Proposed code points and characters names may differ from final code points and names)	Count	L2 ID	WG2 ID	Document
9.0	U+11C00..11C08, 11C0A..11C36, 11C38..11C45, 11C50..11C6C	97	L2/11-259	N4121	Pandey, Anshuman (2011-07-11), Preliminary Proposal to Encode the Bhaiksuki Script in ISO/IEC 10646
9.0	U+11C00..11C08, 11C0A..11C36, 11C38..11C45, 11C50..11C6C	97	L2/11-298		Anderson, Deborah; McGowan, Rick; Whistler, Ken (2011-07-27), "3. Bhaiksuki", South Asian subcommittee report
9.0	U+11C00..11C08, 11C0A..11C36, 11C38..11C45, 11C50..11C6C	97	L2/13-167	N4469	Pandey, Anshuman; Dimitrov, Dragomir (2013-07-22), Proposal to Encode the Bhaiksuki Script in ISO/IEC 10646
9.0	U+11C00..11C08, 11C0A..11C36, 11C38..11C45, 11C50..11C6C	97	L2/13-165		Anderson, Deborah; Whistler, Ken; Pournader, Roozbeh (2013-07-25), "9", Recommendations to UTC on Script Proposals
9.0	U+11C00..11C08, 11C0A..11C36, 11C38..11C45, 11C50..11C6C	97	L2/13-194	N4489	Pandey, Anshuman; Dimitrov, Dragomir (2013-10-27), Revised Proposal to Encode the Bhaiksuki Script in ISO/IEC 10646
9.0	U+11C00..11C08, 11C0A..11C36, 11C38..11C45, 11C50..11C6C	97	L2/14-053		Anderson, Deborah; Whistler, Ken; McGowan, Rick; Pournader, Roozbeh; Iancu, Laurențiu (2014-01-26), "18", Recommendations to UTC #138 February 2014 on Script Proposals
9.0	U+11C00..11C08, 11C0A..11C36, 11C38..11C45, 11C50..11C6C	97	L2/14-036		Pandey, Anshuman; Dimitrov, Dragomir (2014-01-27), Revised Proposal to Encode the Bhaiksuki Script in ISO/IEC 10646
9.0	U+11C00..11C08, 11C0A..11C36, 11C38..11C45, 11C50..11C6C	97	L2/14-091	N4573	Pandey, Anshuman; Dimitrov, Dragomir (2014-04-23), Final Proposal to Encode the Bhaiksuki Script in ISO/IEC 10646
9.0	U+11C00..11C08, 11C0A..11C36, 11C38..11C45, 11C50..11C6C	97	L2/14-129		Anderson, Deborah; Whistler, Ken; McGowan, Rick; Pournader, Roozbeh (2014-05-02), "2", Recommendations to UTC #139 May 2014 on Script Proposals
9.0	U+11C00..11C08, 11C0A..11C36, 11C38..11C45, 11C50..11C6C	97	L2/14-100		Moore, Lisa (2014-05-13), "D.6", UTC #139 Minutes
9.0	U+11C00..11C08, 11C0A..11C36, 11C38..11C45, 11C50..11C6C	97		N4553 (pdf, doc)	Umamaheswaran, V. S. (2014-09-16), "10.2.5", Minutes of WG 2 meeting 62 Adobe, San Jose, CA, USA
9.0	U+11C00..11C08, 11C0A..11C36, 11C38..11C45, 11C50..11C6C	97	L2/16-052	N4603 (pdf, doc)	Umamaheswaran, V. S. (2015-09-01), "M63.02a", Unconfirmed minutes of WG 2 meeting 63
9.0	U+11C00..11C08, 11C0A..11C36, 11C38..11C45, 11C50..11C6C	97	L2/16-121		Moore, Lisa (2016-05-20), "Consensus 147-C31", UTC #147 Minutes, "Change the general category of characters U+11C38..U+11C3B from "Mc" to "Mn" and make them Indic Position Category = "top", for Unicode 9.0."
