= Telugu script =

Writing system from the Brahmic family of scripts

Telugu script తెలుగు లిపి
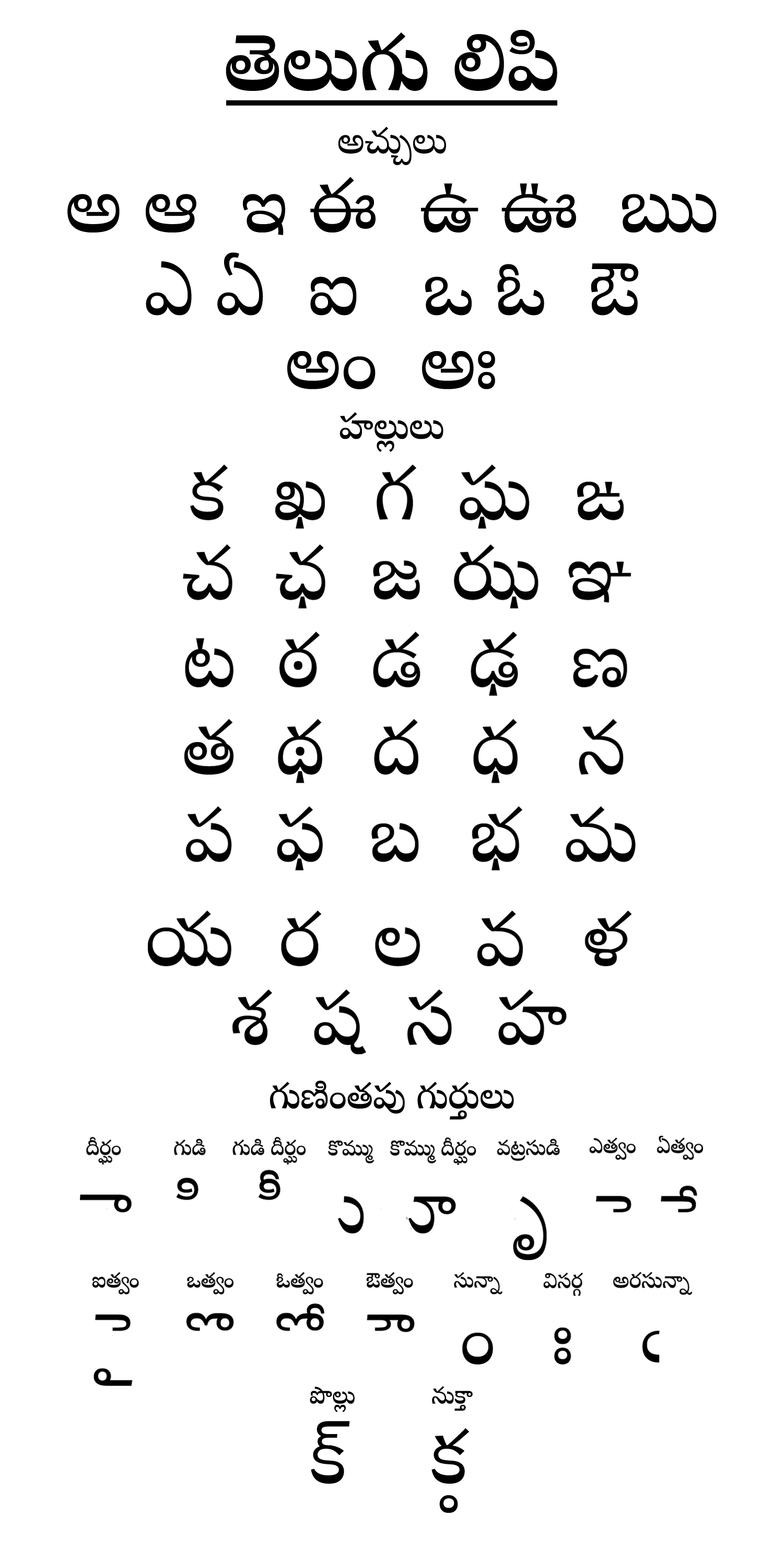
- Telugu Alphabet Chart (Aksharamala)
- Script type: Abugida
- Period: c. 1300 CE–present
- Direction: Left-to-right
- Languages: Telugu; Lambadi; Gondi; Koya; Konda; Sanskrit; Saurashtra

Related scripts
- Parent systems: Egyptian hieroglyphs: Proto-Sinaitic; Phoenician; Aramaic (disputed); Brahmi script; Bhattiprolu script; Telugu-Kannada script; Telugu script
- Sister systems: Kannada

ISO 15924
- ISO 15924: Telu (340), Telugu

Unicode
- Unicode alias: Telugu
- Unicode range: U+0C00–U+0C7F

Telugu script (Telugu: తెలుగు లిపి, romanized: Telugu lipi) is an abugida from the Brahmic family of scripts used to write the Telugu language, a Dravidian language spoken in the Indian states of Andhra Pradesh and Telangana as well as several other neighbouring states. It is one of the official scripts of the Indian Republic. The Telugu script is also widely used for writing Sanskrit texts and to some extent the Gondi language. It gained prominence during the Eastern Chalukyas also known as Vengi Chalukya era. It also shares extensive similarities with the Kannada script.

== History ==
The Brahmi script used by Mauryan kings eventually reached the Krishna River delta and would give rise to the Bhattiprolu script found on an urn purported to contain Lord Buddha's relics. Buddhism spread to East Asia from the nearby ports of Ghantasala and Masulipatnam (ancient Maisolos of Ptolemy and Masalia of Periplus). Kadamba script developed by the Kadamba dynasty was derived from the Bhattiprolu script and later evolved into the Kannada-Telugu script after the 7th century. The Telugu and Kannada scripts then separated by around 1300 CE. The Muslim historian and scholar Al-Biruni referred to both the Telugu language as well as its script as "Andhri".

== Vowels ==
The word 'Telugu Lipi' in Telugu script

Telugu uses sixteen vowels, each of which has both an independent form and a diacritic form used with consonants to create syllables. The language makes a distinction between short and long vowels.

Independent	With క (k)	ISO	IPA	Independent	With క (k)	ISO	IPA
అ	క	a	/a/	ఆ	కా	ā	/aː/
ఇ	కి	i	/i/	ఈ	కీ	ī	/iː/
ఉ	కు	u	/u/	ఊ	కూ	ū	/uː/
ఋ	కృ	r̥	/r̩/	ౠ	కౄ	r̥̄	/r̩ː/
ఌ (Note: Not in modern use.)	కౢ	l̥	/l̩/, [lu]	ౡ	కౣ	l̥̄	/l̩ː/, [luː]
ఎ	కె	e	/e/	ఏ	కే	ē	/eː/
ఐ	కై	ai	/ai/				
ఒ	కొ	o	/o/	ఓ	కో	ō	/oː/
ఔ	కౌ	au	/au/				

The independent form is used when the vowel occurs at the beginning of a word or syllable, or is a complete syllable in itself (example: a, u, o). The diacritic form is added to consonants (represented by the dotted circle) to form a consonant-vowel syllable (example: ka, kr̥, mo). అ does not have a diacritic form, because this vowel is already inherent in all of the consonants. The other diacritic vowels are added to consonants to change their pronunciation to that of the vowel.

Examples:

ఖ + ఈ (ీ) → ఖీ	/kʰa/ + /iː/ → /kʰiː/
జ + ఉ (ు) → జు	/dʒa/ + /u/ → /dʒu/

== Consonants ==
The consonants and their combining forms (on the right) are provided below. Subscript letters are used in consonant clusters and geminate consonants.

క్క ka IPA: /ka/	ఖ్ఖ kha IPA: /kʰa/	గ్గ ga IPA: /ɡa/	ఘ్ఘ gha IPA: /ɡʱa/	ఙ్ఙ ṅa IPA: /ŋa/
చ్చ ca IPA: /t͡ʃa/	ఛ్ఛ cha IPA: /t͡ʃʰa/	జ్జ ja IPA: /d͡ʒa/	ఝ్ఝ jha IPA: /d͡ʒʱa/	ఞ్ఞ ña IPA: /ɲa/
ట్ట ṭa IPA: /ʈa/	ఠ్ఠ ṭha IPA: /ʈʰa/	డ్డ ḍa IPA: /ɖa/	ఢ్ఢ ḍha IPA: /ɖʱa/	ణ్ణ ṇa IPA: /ɳa/
త్త ta IPA: /t̪a/	థ్థ tha IPA: /t̪ʰa/	ద్ద da IPA: /d̪a/	ధ్ధ dha IPA: /d̪ʱa/	న్న na IPA: /n̪a/
ప్ప pa IPA: /pa/	ఫ్ఫ pha IPA: /pʰa/	బ్బ ba IPA: /ba/	భ్భ bha IPA: /bʱa/	మ్మ ma IPA: /ma/
య్య ya IPA: /ja/	ర్ర ra IPA: /ra/	ల్ల la IPA: /la/	వ్వ va IPA: /ʋa/	ళ్ళ ḷa IPA: /ɭa/
శ్శ śa IPA: /ʃa/	ష్ష ṣa IPA: /ʂa/	స్స sa IPA: /sa/	హ్హ ha IPA: /ɦa/	ఱ్ఱ ṟa IPA: /ra/ (Note: This letter is referred to as the banḍi ra as opposed to the ర (ra), which is also referred to as the repha. During the last century, ఱ (ṟa) has decreased in its prevalence, commonly being substituted with a doubled/geminated ర (ra), as ర్ర (rra).)

=== Archaic and obsolete consonants ===
The consonants ౘ (ĉa) and ౙ (ẑa) represent the /t͡sa/ and /d͡za/, respectively, but are rarely used; they are commonly substituted with చ (ca) and జ (ja) instead, respectively. They are referred in Telugu as dantya ca and dantya ja, respectively.

Archaic consonants
ౘ ĉa IPA: /t͡sa/	ౙ za IPA: /d͡za/

Obsolete consonants
ఴ ḻa IPA: /ɻa/	ౚ ḏa IPA: /da/

The letter for a voiced alveolar plosive is found in some inscriptions and is thought to be used as distinguished from the trill ఱ (ṟa) intervocalically in rare cases. It is mostly found after a nasal as in మూన్ౚు (mūnḏu), but is obsolete in modern Telugu.

== Other diacritics ==
There are also several other diacritics used in the Telugu script. ◌్ mutes the vowel of a consonant, so that only the consonant is pronounced. ◌ం represents a corresponding class nasal sound when followed by a consonant from that class (i.e., the last column of the corresponding consonant row for the first five rows of the consonants table); when not followed by anything or by a consonant from the first five rows of the consonant table, it represents a true nasal sound. ◌ఁ represents a historically used ం that is no longer pronounced, or a nasalized vowel when transliterating other languages (e.g., Hindi) into the Telugu script. ◌ః adds a voiceless breath after the vowel or syllable it is attached to.

ం ṁ	ఁ n̆	ః ḥ	్

Examples:

క + ్ → క్	ka + ∅ → k
క + ఁ → కఁ	ka + n̆ → kan̆
క + ం → కం	ka + ṁ → kaṁ
క + ః → కః	ka + ḥ → kaḥ

=== Marginal and archaic diacritics and signs ===
- ⟨◌఼⟩: Telugu nuqta (indicating guttural plosives, like 'q')
- ⟨ఽ⟩: Telugu avagraha (apostrophe)
- ⟨ౝ⟩: Nakara pollu
- ⟨ఀ⟩: The combining candrabindu nasal vowel diacritic of the Telugu script
- ⟨ఄ ⟩: Combining anusvara above
- ⟨౷⟩: Siddham sign
- ⟨౿⟩: Tuumu sign

== Places of articulation ==
There are five classifications of passive articulations:

- Kaṇṭhya: Velar
- Tālavya: Palatal
- Mūrdhanya: Retroflex
- Dantya: Dental
- Ōṣṭhya: Labial

Apart from that, other places are combinations of the above five:

- Dantōṣṭhya: Labio-dental (e.g.: v)
- Kaṇṭatālavya: e.g.: Diphthong e
- Kaṇṭōṣṭhya: labial-velar (e.g.: Diphthong o)

There are three places of active articulation:

- Jihvāmūlam: tongue root, for velar
- Jihvāmadhyam: tongue body, for palatal
- Jihvāgram: tip of tongue, for cerebral and dental
- Adhōṣṭa: lower lip, for labial

The attempt of articulation of consonants (Uccāraṇa Prayatnam) is of two types,

- Bāhya Prayatnam: External effort
  - Spṛṣṭa: Plosive
  - Īṣat Spṛṣṭa: Approximant
  - Īṣat Saṃvṛta: Fricative
- Abhyantara Prayatnam: Internal effort
  - Alpaprāṇam: Unaspirated
  - Mahāprāṇam: Aspirated
  - Śvāsa: Unvoiced
  - Nādam: Voiced

=== Articulation of consonants ===
Articulation of consonants is the logical combination of components in the two prayatnams. The below table gives a view upon articulation of consonants.

Telugu Vyañjana Ucchārana Paṭṭika
Prayatna Niyamāvalī				Kaṇṭhya (jihvāmūlam) (Velar)	Tālavya (jihvāmadhyam) (Palatal)	Mūrdhanya (jihvāgram) (Retroflex)	Dantya (jihvāgram) (Dental)	Dantōṣṭhya (Labiodental)	Ōṣṭhya (adhōṣṭa) (Labial)
Sparśa (Plosive)	Śvāsa (Unvoiced)	Alpaprānam (Unaspirated)		ka (క)	ca (చ)	ṭa (ట)	ta (త)	—	pa (ప)
Sparśa (Plosive)	Śvāsa (Unvoiced)	Mahāprānam (Aspirated)		kha (ఖ)	cha (ఛ)	ṭha (ఠ)	tha (థ)	—	pha (ఫ)
Sparśa (Plosive)	Nādam (Voiced)	Alpaprānam (Unaspirated)		ga (గ)	ja (జ)	ḍa (డ)	da (ద)	—	ba (బ)
Sparśa (Plosive)	Nādam (Voiced)	Mahāprānam (Aspirated)		gha (ఘ)	jha (ఝ)	ḍha (ఢ)	dha (ధ)	—	bha (భ)
Sparśa (Plosive)	Anunāsikam (Nasal)	Nādam, Alpaprānam, Dravam	Avyāhata	ṅa (ఙ)	ña (ఞ)	ṇa (ణ)	na (న)	—	ma (మ)
Antastha		Nādam, Alpaprānam, Dravam	Avyāhata	—	ya (య)	ra (ర) (Luṇṭhita) ḷa (ళ) (Pārśvika)	la (ల) (Pārśvika) ṟa (ఱ) (Kampita)	va (వ)	—
Ūṣman	Śvāsa	Mahāprānam	Avyāhata	Visarga	śa (శ)	ṣa (ష)	sa (స)	—	—
Ūṣman	Nādam	Mahāprānam	Avyāhata	ha (హ)	—	—	—	—	—

== Consonant conjuncts ==
The Telugu script has generally regular consonant conjuncts, with trailing consonants taking a subjoined form, often losing the talakattu (the v-shaped headstroke). The following table shows all two-consonant conjuncts and one three-consonant conjunct, but individual conjuncts may differ between fonts. These are referred in Telugu as vattulu (వత్తులు).

All Telugu Vattulu (వత్తులు)
Consonant	క	ఖ	గ	ఘ	ఙ	చ	ఛ	జ	ఝ	ఞ	ట	ఠ	డ	ఢ	ణ	త	థ	ద	ధ	న	ప	ఫ	బ	భ	మ	య	ర	ల	వ	శ	ష	స	హ	ళ	ఱ
క	క్క	క్ఖ	క్గ	క్ఘ	క్ఙ	క్చ	క్ఛ	క్జ	క్ఝ	క్ఞ	క్ట	క్ఠ	క్డ	క్ఢ	క్ణ	క్త	క్థ	క్ద	క్ధ	క్న	క్ప	క్ఫ	క్బ	క్భ	క్మ	క్య	క్ర	క్ల	క్వ	క్శ	క్ష	క్స	క్హ	క్ళ	క్ఱ
ఖ	ఖ్క	ఖ్ఖ	ఖ్గ	ఖ్ఘ	ఖ్ఙ	ఖ్చ	ఖ్ఛ	ఖ్జ	ఖ్ఝ	ఖ్ఞ	ఖ్ట	ఖ్ఠ	ఖ్డ	ఖ్ఢ	ఖ్ణ	ఖ్త	ఖ్థ	ఖ్ద	ఖ్ధ	ఖ్న	ఖ్ప	ఖ్ఫ	ఖ్బ	ఖ్భ	ఖ్మ	ఖ్య	ఖ్ర	ఖ్ల	ఖ్వ	ఖ్శ	ఖ్ష	ఖ్స	ఖ్హ	ఖ్ళ	ఖ్ఱ
గ	గ్క	గ్ఖ	గ్గ	గ్ఘ	గ్ఙ	గ్చ	గ్ఛ	గ్జ	గ్ఝ	గ్ఞ	గ్ట	గ్ఠ	గ్డ	గ్ఢ	గ్ణ	గ్త	గ్థ	గ్ద	గ్ధ	గ్న	గ్ప	గ్ఫ	గ్బ	గ్భ	గ్మ	గ్య	గ్ర	గ్ల	గ్వ	గ్శ	గ్ష	గ్స	గ్హ	గ్ళ	గ్ఱ
ఘ	ఘ్క	ఘ్ఖ	ఘ్గ	ఘ్ఘ	ఘ్ఙ	ఘ్చ	ఘ్ఛ	ఘ్జ	ఘ్ఝ	ఘ్ఞ	ఘ్ట	ఘ్ఠ	ఘ్డ	ఘ్ఢ	ఘ్ణ	ఘ్త	ఘ్థ	ఘ్ద	ఘ్ధ	ఘ్న	ఘ్ప	ఘ్ఫ	ఘ్బ	ఘ్భ	ఘ్మ	ఘ్య	ఘ్ర	ఘ్ల	ఘ్వ	ఘ్శ	ఘ్ష	ఘ్స	ఘ్హ	ఘ్ళ	ఘ్ఱ
ఙ	ఙ్క	ఙ్ఖ	ఙ్గ	ఙ్ఘ	ఙ్ఙ	ఙ్చ	ఙ్ఛ	ఙ్జ	ఙ్ఝ	ఙ్ఞ	ఙ్ట	ఙ్ఠ	ఙ్డ	ఙ్ఢ	ఙ్ణ	ఙ్త	ఙ్థ	ఙ్ద	ఙ్ధ	ఙ్న	ఙ్ప	ఙ్ఫ	ఙ్బ	ఙ్భ	ఙ్మ	ఙ్య	ఙ్ర	ఙ్ల	ఙ్వ	ఙ్శ	ఙ్ష	ఙ్స	ఙ్హ	ఙ్ళ	ఙ్ఱ
చ	చ్క	చ్ఖ	చ్గ	చ్ఘ	చ్ఙ	చ్చ	చ్ఛ	చ్జ	చ్ఝ	చ్ఞ	చ్ట	చ్ఠ	చ్డ	చ్ఢ	చ్ణ	చ్త	చ్థ	చ్ద	చ్ధ	చ్న	చ్ప	చ్ఫ	చ్బ	చ్భ	చ్మ	చ్య	చ్ర	చ్ల	చ్వ	చ్శ	చ్ష	చ్స	చ్హ	చ్ళ	చ్ఱ
ఛ	ఛ్క	ఛ్ఖ	ఛ్గ	ఛ్ఘ	ఛ్ఙ	ఛ్చ	ఛ్ఛ	ఛ్జ	ఛ్ఝ	ఛ్ఞ	ఛ్ట	ఛ్ఠ	ఛ్డ	ఛ్ఢ	ఛ్ణ	ఛ్త	ఛ్థ	ఛ్ద	ఛ్ధ	ఛ్న	ఛ్ప	ఛ్ఫ	ఛ్బ	ఛ్భ	ఛ్మ	ఛ్య	ఛ్ర	ఛ్ల	ఛ్వ	ఛ్శ	ఛ్ష	ఛ్స	ఛ్హ	ఛ్ళ	ఛ్ఱ
జ	జ్క	జ్ఖ	జ్గ	జ్ఘ	జ్ఙ	జ్చ	జ్ఛ	జ్జ	జ్ఝ	జ్ఞ	జ్ట	జ్ఠ	జ్డ	జ్ఢ	జ్ణ	జ్త	జ్థ	జ్ద	జ్ధ	జ్న	జ్ప	జ్ఫ	జ్బ	జ్భ	జ్మ	జ్య	జ్ర	జ్ల	జ్వ	జ్శ	జ్ష	జ్స	జ్హ	జ్ళ	జ్ఱ
ఝ	ఝ్క	ఝ్ఖ	ఝ్గ	ఝ్ఘ	ఝ్ఙ	ఝ్చ	ఝ్ఛ	ఝ్జ	ఝ్ఝ	ఝ్ఞ	ఝ్ట	ఝ్ఠ	ఝ్డ	ఝ్ఢ	ఝ్ణ	ఝ్త	ఝ్థ	ఝ్ద	ఝ్ధ	ఝ్న	ఝ్ప	ఝ్ఫ	ఝ్బ	ఝ్భ	ఝ్మ	ఝ్య	ఝ్ర	ఝ్ల	ఝ్వ	ఝ్శ	ఝ్ష	ఝ్స	ఝ్హ	ఝ్ళ	ఝ్ఱ
ఞ	ఞ్క	ఞ్ఖ	ఞ్గ	ఞ్ఘ	ఞ్ఙ	ఞ్చ	ఞ్ఛ	ఞ్జ	ఞ్ఝ	ఞ్ఞ	ఞ్ట	ఞ్ఠ	ఞ్డ	ఞ్ఢ	ఞ్ణ	ఞ్త	ఞ్థ	ఞ్ద	ఞ్ధ	ఞ్న	ఞ్ప	ఞ్ఫ	ఞ్బ	ఞ్భ	ఞ్మ	ఞ్య	ఞ్ర	ఞ్ల	ఞ్వ	ఞ్శ	ఞ్ష	ఞ్స	ఞ్హ	ఞ్ళ	ఞ్ఱ
ట	ట్క	ట్ఖ	ట్గ	ట్ఘ	ట్ఙ	ట్చ	ట్ఛ	ట్జ	ట్ఝ	ట్ఞ	ట్ట	ట్ఠ	ట్డ	ట్ఢ	ట్ణ	ట్త	ట్థ	ట్ద	ట్ధ	ట్న	ట్ప	ట్ఫ	ట్బ	ట్భ	ట్మ	ట్య	ట్ర	ట్ల	ట్వ	ట్శ	ట్ష	ట్స	ట్హ	ట్ళ	ట్ఱ
ఠ	ఠ్క	ఠ్ఖ	ఠ్గ	ఠ్ఘ	ఠ్ఙ	ఠ్చ	ఠ్ఛ	ఠ్జ	ఠ్ఝ	ఠ్ఞ	ఠ్ట	ఠ్ఠ	ఠ్డ	ఠ్ఢ	ఠ్ణ	ఠ్త	ఠ్థ	ఠ్ద	ఠ్ధ	ఠ్న	ఠ్ప	ఠ్ఫ	ఠ్బ	ఠ్భ	ఠ్మ	ఠ్య	ఠ్ర	ఠ్ల	ఠ్వ	ఠ్శ	ఠ్ష	ఠ్స	ఠ్హ	ఠ్ళ	ఠ్ఱ
డ	డ్క	డ్ఖ	డ్గ	డ్ఘ	డ్ఙ	డ్చ	డ్ఛ	డ్జ	డ్ఝ	డ్ఞ	డ్ట	డ్ఠ	డ్డ	డ్ఢ	డ్ణ	డ్త	డ్థ	డ్ద	డ్ధ	డ్న	డ్ప	డ్ఫ	డ్బ	డ్భ	డ్మ	డ్య	డ్ర	డ్ల	డ్వ	డ్శ	డ్ష	డ్స	డ్హ	డ్ళ	డ్ఱ
ఢ	ఢ్క	ఢ్ఖ	ఢ్గ	ఢ్ఘ	ఢ్ఙ	ఢ్చ	ఢ్ఛ	ఢ్జ	ఢ్ఝ	ఢ్ఞ	ఢ్ట	ఢ్ఠ	ఢ్డ	ఢ్ఢ	ఢ్ణ	ఢ్త	ఢ్థ	ఢ్ద	ఢ్ధ	ఢ్న	ఢ్ప	ఢ్ఫ	ఢ్బ	ఢ్భ	ఢ్మ	ఢ్య	ఢ్ర	ఢ్ల	ఢ్వ	ఢ్శ	ఢ్ష	ఢ్స	ఢ్హ	ఢ్ళ	ఢ్ఱ
ణ	ణ్క	ణ్ఖ	ణ్గ	ణ్ఘ	ణ్ఙ	ణ్చ	ణ్ఛ	ణ్జ	ణ్ఝ	ణ్ఞ	ణ్ట	ణ్ఠ	ణ్డ	ణ్ఢ	ణ్ణ	ణ్త	ణ్థ	ణ్ద	ణ్ధ	ణ్న	ణ్ప	ణ్ఫ	ణ్బ	ణ్భ	ణ్మ	ణ్య	ణ్ర	ణ్ల	ణ్వ	ణ్శ	ణ్ష	ణ్స	ణ్హ	ణ్ళ	ణ్ఱ
త	త్క	త్ఖ	త్గ	త్ఘ	త్ఙ	త్చ	త్ఛ	త్జ	త్ఝ	త్ఞ	త్ట	త్ఠ	త్డ	త్ఢ	త్ణ	త్త	త్థ	త్ద	త్ధ	త్న	త్ప	త్ఫ	త్బ	త్భ	త్మ	త్య	త్ర	త్ల	త్వ	త్శ	త్ష	త్స	త్హ	త్ళ	త్ఱ
థ	థ్క	థ్ఖ	థ్గ	థ్ఘ	థ్ఙ	థ్చ	థ్ఛ	థ్జ	థ్ఝ	థ్ఞ	థ్ట	థ్ఠ	థ్డ	థ్ఢ	థ్ణ	థ్త	థ్థ	థ్ద	థ్ధ	థ్న	థ్ప	థ్ఫ	థ్బ	థ్భ	థ్మ	థ్య	థ్ర	థ్ల	థ్వ	థ్శ	థ్ష	థ్స	థ్హ	థ్ళ	థ్ఱ
ద	ద్క	ద్ఖ	ద్గ	ద్ఘ	ద్ఙ	ద్చ	ద్ఛ	ద్జ	ద్ఝ	ద్ఞ	ద్ట	ద్ఠ	ద్డ	ద్ఢ	ద్ణ	ద్త	ద్థ	ద్ద	ద్ధ	ద్న	ద్ప	ద్ఫ	ద్బ	ద్భ	ద్మ	ద్య	ద్ర	ద్ల	ద్వ	ద్శ	ద్ష	ద్స	ద్హ	ద్ళ	ద్ఱ
ధ	ధ్క	ధ్ఖ	ధ్గ	ధ్ఘ	ధ్ఙ	ధ్చ	ధ్ఛ	ధ్జ	ధ్ఝ	ధ్ఞ	ధ్ట	ధ్ఠ	ధ్డ	ధ్ఢ	ధ్ణ	ధ్త	ధ్థ	ధ్ద	ధ్ధ	ధ్న	ధ్ప	ధ్ఫ	ధ్బ	ధ్భ	ధ్మ	ధ్య	ధ్ర	ధ్ల	ధ్వ	ధ్శ	ధ్ష	ధ్స	ధ్హ	ధ్ళ	ధ్ఱ
న	న్క	న్ఖ	న్గ	న్ఘ	న్ఙ	న్చ	న్ఛ	న్జ	న్ఝ	న్ఞ	న్ట	న్ఠ	న్డ	న్ఢ	న్ణ	న్త	న్థ	న్ద	న్ధ	న్న	న్ప	న్ఫ	న్బ	న్భ	న్మ	న్య	న్ర	న్ల	న్వ	న్శ	న్ష	న్స	న్హ	న్ళ	న్ఱ
ప	ప్క	ప్ఖ	ప్గ	ప్ఘ	ప్ఙ	ప్చ	ప్ఛ	ప్జ	ప్ఝ	ప్ఞ	ప్ట	ప్ఠ	ప్డ	ప్ఢ	ప్ణ	ప్త	ప్థ	ప్ద	ప్ధ	ప్న	ప్ప	ప్ఫ	ప్బ	ప్భ	ప్మ	ప్య	ప్ర	ప్ల	ప్వ	ప్శ	ప్ష	ప్స	ప్హ	ప్ళ	ప్ఱ
ఫ	ఫ్క	ఫ్ఖ	ఫ్గ	ఫ్ఘ	ఫ్ఙ	ఫ్చ	ఫ్ఛ	ఫ్జ	ఫ్ఝ	ఫ్ఞ	ఫ్ట	ఫ్ఠ	ఫ్డ	ఫ్ఢ	ఫ్ణ	ఫ్త	ఫ్థ	ఫ్ద	ఫ్ధ	ఫ్న	ఫ్ప	ఫ్ఫ	ఫ్బ	ఫ్భ	ఫ్మ	ఫ్య	ఫ్ర	ఫ్ల	ఫ్వ	ఫ్శ	ఫ్ష	ఫ్స	ఫ్హ	ఫ్ళ	ఫ్ఱ
బ	బ్క	బ్ఖ	బ్గ	బ్ఘ	బ్ఙ	బ్చ	బ్ఛ	బ్జ	బ్ఝ	బ్ఞ	బ్ట	బ్ఠ	బ్డ	బ్ఢ	బ్ణ	బ్త	బ్థ	బ్ద	బ్ధ	బ్న	బ్ప	బ్ఫ	బ్బ	బ్భ	బ్మ	బ్య	బ్ర	బ్ల	బ్వ	బ్శ	బ్ష	బ్స	బ్హ	బ్ళ	బ్ఱ
భ	భ్క	భ్ఖ	భ్గ	భ్ఘ	భ్ఙ	భ్చ	భ్ఛ	భ్జ	భ్ఝ	భ్ఞ	భ్ట	భ్ఠ	భ్డ	భ్ఢ	భ్ణ	భ్త	భ్థ	భ్ద	భ్ధ	భ్న	భ్ప	భ్ఫ	భ్బ	భ్భ	భ్మ	భ్య	భ్ర	భ్ల	భ్వ	భ్శ	భ్ష	భ్స	భ్హ	భ్ళ	భ్ఱ
మ	మ్క	మ్ఖ	మ్గ	మ్ఘ	మ్ఙ	మ్చ	మ్ఛ	మ్జ	మ్ఝ	మ్ఞ	మ్ట	మ్ఠ	మ్డ	మ్ఢ	మ్ణ	మ్త	మ్థ	మ్ద	మ్ధ	మ్న	మ్ప	మ్ఫ	మ్బ	మ్భ	మ్మ	మ్య	మ్ర	మ్ల	మ్వ	మ్శ	మ్ష	మ్స	మ్హ	మ్ళ	మ్ఱ
య	య్క	య్ఖ	య్గ	య్ఘ	య్ఙ	య్చ	య్ఛ	య్జ	య్ఝ	య్ఞ	య్ట	య్ఠ	య్డ	య్ఢ	య్ణ	య్త	య్థ	య్ద	య్ధ	య్న	య్ప	య్ఫ	య్బ	య్భ	య్మ	య్య	య్ర	య్ల	య్వ	య్శ	య్ష	య్స	య్హ	య్ళ	య్ఱ
ర	ర్క	ర్ఖ	ర్గ	ర్ఘ	ర్ఙ	ర్చ	ర్ఛ	ర్జ	ర్ఝ	ర్ఞ	ర్ట	ర్ఠ	ర్డ	ర్ఢ	ర్ణ	ర్త	ర్థ	ర్ద	ర్ధ	ర్న	ర్ప	ర్ఫ	ర్బ	ర్భ	ర్మ	ర్య	ర్ర	ర్ల	ర్వ	ర్శ	ర్ష	ర్స	ర్హ	ర్ళ	ర్ఱ
ల	ల్క	ల్ఖ	ల్గ	ల్ఘ	ల్ఙ	ల్చ	ల్ఛ	ల్జ	ల్ఝ	ల్ఞ	ల్ట	ల్ఠ	ల్డ	ల్ఢ	ల్ణ	ల్త	ల్థ	ల్ద	ల్ధ	ల్న	ల్ప	ల్ఫ	ల్బ	ల్భ	ల్మ	ల్య	ల్ర	ల్ల	ల్వ	ల్శ	ల్ష	ల్స	ల్హ	ల్ళ	ల్ఱ
వ	వ్క	వ్ఖ	వ్గ	వ్ఘ	వ్ఙ	వ్చ	వ్ఛ	వ్జ	వ్ఝ	వ్ఞ	వ్ట	వ్ఠ	వ్డ	వ్ఢ	వ్ణ	వ్త	వ్థ	వ్ద	వ్ధ	వ్న	వ్ప	వ్ఫ	వ్బ	వ్భ	వ్మ	వ్య	వ్ర	వ్ల	వ్వ	వ్శ	వ్ష	వ్స	వ్హ	వ్ళ	వ్ఱ
శ	శ్క	శ్ఖ	శ్గ	శ్ఘ	శ్ఙ	శ్చ	శ్ఛ	శ్జ	శ్ఝ	శ్ఞ	శ్ట	శ్ఠ	శ్డ	శ్ఢ	శ్ణ	శ్త	శ్థ	శ్ద	శ్ధ	శ్న	శ్ప	శ్ఫ	శ్బ	శ్భ	శ్మ	శ్య	శ్ర	శ్ల	శ్వ	శ్శ	శ్ష	శ్స	శ్హ	శ్ళ	శ్ఱ
ష	ష్క	ష్ఖ	ష్గ	ష్ఘ	ష్ఙ	ష్చ	ష్ఛ	ష్జ	ష్ఝ	ష్ఞ	ష్ట	ష్ఠ	ష్డ	ష్ఢ	ష్ణ	ష్త	ష్థ	ష్ద	ష్ధ	ష్న	ష్ప	ష్ఫ	ష్బ	ష్భ	ష్మ	ష్య	ష్ర	ష్ల	ష్వ	ష్శ	ష్ష	ష్స	ష్హ	ష్ళ	ష్ఱ
స	స్క	స్ఖ	స్గ	స్ఘ	స్ఙ	స్చ	స్ఛ	స్జ	స్ఝ	స్ఞ	స్ట	స్ఠ	స్డ	స్ఢ	స్ణ	స్త	స్థ	స్ద	స్ధ	స్న	స్ప	స్ఫ	స్బ	స్భ	స్మ	స్య	స్ర	స్ల	స్వ	స్శ	స్ష	స్స	స్హ	స్ళ	స్ఱ
హ	హ్క	హ్ఖ	హ్గ	హ్ఘ	హ్ఙ	హ్చ	హ్ఛ	హ్జ	హ్ఝ	హ్ఞ	హ్ట	హ్ఠ	హ్డ	హ్ఢ	హ్ణ	హ్త	హ్థ	హ్ద	హ్ధ	హ్న	హ్ప	హ్ఫ	హ్బ	హ్భ	హ్మ	హ్య	హ్ర	హ్ల	హ్వ	హ్శ	హ్ష	హ్స	హ్హ	హ్ళ	హ్ఱ
ళ	ళ్క	ళ్ఖ	ళ్గ	ళ్ఘ	ళ్ఙ	ళ్చ	ళ్ఛ	ళ్జ	ళ్ఝ	ళ్ఞ	ళ్ట	ళ్ఠ	ళ్డ	ళ్ఢ	ళ్ణ	ళ్త	ళ్థ	ళ్ద	ళ్ధ	ళ్న	ళ్ప	ళ్ఫ	ళ్బ	ళ్భ	ళ్మ	ళ్య	ళ్ర	ళ్ల	ళ్వ	ళ్శ	ళ్ష	ళ్స	ళ్హ	ళ్ళ	ళ్ఱ
ఱ	ఱ్క	ఱ్ఖ	ఱ్గ	ఱ్ఘ	ఱ్ఙ	ఱ్చ	ఱ్ఛ	ఱ్జ	ఱ్ఝ	ఱ్ఞ	ఱ్ట	ఱ్ఠ	ఱ్డ	ఱ్ఢ	ఱ్ణ	ఱ్త	ఱ్థ	ఱ్ద	ఱ్ధ	ఱ్న	ఱ్ప	ఱ్ఫ	ఱ్బ	ఱ్భ	ఱ్మ	ఱ్య	ఱ్ర	ఱ్ల	ఱ్వ	ఱ్శ	ఱ్ష	ఱ్స	ఱ్హ	ఱ్ళ	ఱ్ఱ
	క	ఖ	గ	ఘ	ఙ	చ	ఛ	జ	ఝ	ఞ	ట	ఠ	డ	ఢ	ణ	త	థ	ద	ధ	న	ప	ఫ	బ	భ	మ	య	ర	ల	వ	శ	ష	స	హ	ళ	ఱ

== Consonants with vowel diacritics ==
The consonants with vowel diacritics are referred to in the Telugu language as guṇintālu (గుణింతాలు). The word Guṇita refers to 'multiplying oneself'. Therefore, each consonant sound can be multiplied with vowel sounds to produce vowel diacritics. The vowel diacritics along with their symbols and names are given below.

Diacritic symbol	Vowel letter	Diacritic name	Example
none	(అ, a)	తలకట్టు (talakaṭṭu)	క
ా	(ఆ, ā)	దీర్ఘం (dīrgham)	కా
ి	(ఇ, i)	గుడి (guḍi)	కి
ీ	(ఈ, ī)	గుడి దీర్ఘం (guḍi dīrgham)	కీ
ు	(ఉ, u)	కొమ్ము (kommu)	కు
ూ	(ఊ, ū)	కొమ్ము దీర్ఘం (kommu dīrgham)	కూ
ృ	(ఋ, r̥)	వట్రసుడి (vaṭrasuḍi)	కృ
ౄ	(ౠ, r̥̄)	వట్రసుడి దీర్ఘం (vaṭrasuḍi dīrgham)	కౄ
ౢ	(ఌ, l̥)	ఌత్వం (ḷtvam)	కౢ
ౣ	(ౡ, l̥̄)	ఌత్వ దీర్ఘం (ḷtva dīrgham)	కౣ
ె	(ఎ, e)	ఎత్వం (etvam)	కె
ే	(ఏ, ē)	ఏత్వం (ētvam)	కే
ై	(ఐ, ai)	ఐత్వం (aitvam)	కై
ొ	(ఒ, o)	ఒత్వం (otvam)	కొ
ో	(ఓ, ō)	ఓత్వం (ōtvam)	కో
ౌ	(ఔ, au)	ఔత్వం (autvam)	కౌ
ం	(అం, aṁ)	సున్నా (sunnā)	కం
ః	(అః, aḥ)	విసర్గ (visarga)	కః
ఁ	(అఁ, an̆)	అరసున్నా (arasunnā)	కఁ
్	—	పొల్లు (pollu)	క్

The following table contains the consonants with vowel diacritics in the Telugu language.

అ	ఆ	ఇ	ఈ	ఉ	ఊ	ఋ	ౠ	ఌ	ౡ	ఎ	ఏ	ఐ	ఒ	ఓ	ఔ	అఁ	అం	అః	—
క	కా	కి	కీ	కు	కూ	కృ	కౄ	కౢ	కౣ	కె	కే	కై	కొ	కో	కౌ	కఁ	కం	కః	క్
ఖ	ఖా	ఖి	ఖీ	ఖు	ఖూ	ఖృ	ఖౄ	ఖౢ	ఖౣ	ఖె	ఖే	ఖై	ఖొ	ఖో	ఖౌ	ఖఁ	ఖం	ఖః	ఖ్
గ	గా	గి	గీ	గు	గూ	గృ	గౄ	గౢ	గౣ	గె	గే	గై	గొ	గో	గౌ	గఁ	గం	గః	గ్
ఘ	ఘా	ఘి	ఘీ	ఘు	ఘూ	ఘృ	ఘౄ	ఘౢ	ఘౣ	ఘె	ఘే	ఘై	ఘొ	ఘో	ఘౌ	ఘఁ	ఘం	ఘః	ఘ్
ఙ	ఙా	ఙి	ఙీ	ఙు	ఙూ	ఙృ	ఙౄ	ఙౢ	ఙౣ	ఙె	ఙే	ఙై	ఙొ	ఙో	ఙౌ	ఙఁ	ఙం	ఙః	ఙ్
చ	చా	చి	చీ	చు	చూ	చృ	చౄ	చౢ	చౣ	చె	చే	చై	చొ	చో	చౌ	చఁ	చం	చః	చ్
ఛ	ఛా	ఛి	ఛీ	ఛు	ఛూ	ఛృ	ఛౄ	ఛౢ	ఛౣ	ఛె	ఛే	ఛై	ఛొ	ఛో	ఛౌ	ఛఁ	ఛం	ఛః	ఛ్
జ	జా	జి	జీ	జు	జూ	జృ	జౄ	జౢ	జౣ	జె	జే	జై	జొ	జో	జౌ	జఁ	జం	జః	జ్
ఝ	ఝా	ఝి	ఝీ	ఝు	ఝూ	ఝృ	ఝౄ	ఝౢ	ఝౣ	ఝె	ఝే	ఝై	ఝొ	ఝో	ఝౌ	ఝఁ	ఝం	ఝః	ఝ్
ఞ	ఞా	ఞి	ఞీ	ఞు	ఞూ	ఞృ	ఞౄ	ఞౢ	ఞౣ	ఞె	ఞే	ఞై	ఞొ	ఞో	ఞౌ	ఞఁ	ఞం	ఞః	ఞ్
ట	టా	టి	టీ	టు	టూ	టృ	టౄ	టౢ	టౣ	టె	టే	టై	టొ	టో	టౌ	టఁ	టం	టః	ట్
ఠ	ఠా	ఠి	ఠీ	ఠు	ఠూ	ఠృ	ఠౄ	ఠౢ	ఠౣ	ఠె	ఠే	ఠై	ఠొ	ఠో	ఠౌ	ఠఁ	ఠం	ఠః	ఠ్
డ	డా	డి	డీ	డు	డూ	డృ	డౄ	డౢ	డౣ	డె	డే	డై	డొ	డో	డౌ	డఁ	డం	డః	డ్
ఢ	ఢా	ఢి	ఢీ	ఢు	ఢూ	ఢృ	ఢౄ	ఢౢ	ఢౣ	ఢె	ఢే	ఢై	ఢొ	ఢో	ఢౌ	ఢఁ	ఢం	ఢః	ఢ్
ణ	ణా	ణి	ణీ	ణు	ణూ	ణృ	ణౄ	ణౢ	ణౣ	ణె	ణే	ణై	ణొ	ణో	ణౌ	ణఁ	ణం	ణః	ణ్
త	తా	తి	తీ	తు	తూ	తృ	తౄ	తౢ	తౣ	తె	తే	తై	తొ	తో	తౌ	తఁ	తం	తః	త్
థ	థా	థి	థీ	థు	థూ	థృ	థౄ	థౢ	థౣ	థె	థే	థై	థొ	థో	థౌ	థఁ	థం	థః	థ్
ద	దా	ది	దీ	దు	దూ	దృ	దౄ	దౢ	దౣ	దె	దే	దై	దొ	దో	దౌ	దఁ	దం	దః	ద్
ధ	ధా	ధి	ధీ	ధు	ధూ	ధృ	ధౄ	ధౢ	ధౣ	ధె	ధే	ధై	ధొ	ధో	ధౌ	ధఁ	ధం	ధః	ధ్
న	నా	ని	నీ	ను	నూ	నృ	నౄ	నౢ	నౣ	నె	నే	నై	నొ	నో	నౌ	నఁ	నం	నః	న్
ప	పా	పి	పీ	పు	పూ	పృ	పౄ	పౢ	పౣ	పె	పే	పై	పొ	పో	పౌ	పఁ	పం	పః	ప్
ఫ	ఫా	ఫి	ఫీ	ఫు	ఫూ	ఫృ	ఫౄ	ఫౢ	ఫౣ	ఫె	ఫే	ఫై	ఫొ	ఫో	ఫౌ	ఫఁ	ఫం	ఫః	ఫ్
బ	బా	బి	బీ	బు	బూ	బృ	బౄ	బౢ	బౣ	బె	బే	బై	బొ	బో	బౌ	బఁ	బం	బః	బ్
భ	భా	భి	భీ	భు	భూ	భృ	భౄ	భౢ	భౣ	భె	భే	భై	భొ	భో	భౌ	భఁ	భం	భః	భ్
మ	మా	మి	మీ	ము	మూ	మృ	మౄ	మౢ	మౣ	మె	మే	మై	మొ	మో	మౌ	మఁ	మం	మః	మ్
య	యా	యి	యీ	యు	యూ	యృ	యౄ	యౢ	యౣ	యె	యే	యై	యొ	యో	యౌ	యఁ	యం	యః	య్
ర	రా	రి	రీ	రు	రూ	రృ	రౄ	రౢ	రౣ	రె	రే	రై	రొ	రో	రౌ	రఁ	రం	రః	ర్
ల	లా	లి	లీ	లు	లూ	లృ	లౄ	లౢ	లౣ	లె	లే	లై	లొ	లో	లౌ	లఁ	లం	లః	ల్
వ	వా	వి	వీ	వు	వూ	వృ	వౄ	వౢ	వౣ	వె	వే	వై	వొ	వో	వౌ	వఁ	వం	వః	వ్
శ	శా	శి	శీ	శు	శూ	శృ	శౄ	శౢ	శౣ	శె	శే	శై	శొ	శో	శౌ	శఁ	శం	శః	శ్
ష	షా	షి	షీ	షు	షూ	షృ	షౄ	షౢ	షౣ	షె	షే	షై	షొ	షో	షౌ	షఁ	షం	షః	ష్
స	సా	సి	సీ	సు	సూ	సృ	సౄ	సౢ	సౣ	సె	సే	సై	సొ	సో	సౌ	సఁ	సం	సః	స్
హ	హా	హి	హీ	హు	హూ	హృ	హౄ	హౢ	హౣ	హె	హే	హై	హొ	హో	హౌ	హఁ	హం	హః	హ్
ళ	ళా	ళి	ళీ	ళు	ళూ	ళృ	ళౄ	ళౢ	ళౣ	ళె	ళే	ళై	ళొ	ళో	ళౌ	ళఁ	ళం	ళః	ళ్
ఱ	ఱా	ఱి	ఱీ	ఱు	ఱూ	ఱృ	ఱౄ	ఱౢ	ఱౣ	ఱె	ఱే	ఱై	ఱొ	ఱో	ఱౌ	ఱఁ	ఱం	ఱః	ఱ్

== Numerals ==
0	1	2	3	4	5	6	7	8	9
౦	౧	౨	౩	౪	౫	౬	౭	౮	౯

0/4	1/4	2/4	3/4	0/16	1/16	2/16	3/16
౸	౹	౺	౻	౦	౼	౽	౾

NOTE: ౹, ౺, and ౻ are used also for 1/64, 2/64, 3/64, 1/1024, etc. and ౼, ౽, and ౾ are also used for 1/256, 2/256, 3/256, 1/4096, etc.

== Unicode ==
Telugu script was added to the Unicode Standard in October, 1991 with the release of version 1.0.

The Unicode block for Telugu is U+0C00–U+0C7F:

Telugu^{[1]}^{[2]} Official Unicode Consortium code chart (PDF)
	0	1	2	3	4	5	6	7	8	9	A	B	C	D	E	F
U+0C0x	ఀ	ఁ	ం	ః	ఄ	అ	ఆ	ఇ	ఈ	ఉ	ఊ	ఋ	ఌ		ఎ	ఏ
U+0C1x	ఐ		ఒ	ఓ	ఔ	క	ఖ	గ	ఘ	ఙ	చ	ఛ	జ	ఝ	ఞ	ట
U+0C2x	ఠ	డ	ఢ	ణ	త	థ	ద	ధ	న		ప	ఫ	బ	భ	మ	య
U+0C3x	ర	ఱ	ల	ళ	ఴ	వ	శ	ష	స	హ			఼	ఽ	ా	ి
U+0C4x	ీ	ు	ూ	ృ	ౄ		ె	ే	ై		ొ	ో	ౌ	్		
U+0C5x						ౕ	ౖ		ౘ	ౙ	ౚ		౜	ౝ		
U+0C6x	ౠ	ౡ	ౢ	ౣ			౦	౧	౨	౩	౪	౫	౬	౭	౮	౯
U+0C7x								౷	౸	౹	౺	౻	౼	౽	౾	౿
Notes 1.As of Unicode version 18.0 2.Grey areas indicate non-assigned code points

In contrast to a syllabic script such as katakana, where one Unicode code point represents the glyph for one syllable, Telugu combines multiple code points to generate the glyph for one syllable, using complex font rendering rules.

== iOS character crash bug ==
On February 12, 2018, a bug in the iOS operating system was reported that caused iOS devices to crash if a particular Telugu character was displayed. The character is a combination of the characters ⟨జ⟩, ⟨్⟩, ⟨ఞ⟩, and ⟨ా⟩, and the zero-width non-joiner character, which displays as ⟨జ్ఞా⟩. Apple confirmed a fix for iOS 11.3 and macOS 10.13.4.

== See also ==
- Telugu Braille
- Kannada script
- Sinhala script
- Grantha script
- ISO 15919
