= Avagraha =

Symbol used in Indian languages

Example glyphs
- Bengali–Assamese: ঽ
- Tibetan: ྅
- Malayalam: ഽ
- Devanagari: ऽ

Properties
- Phonemic representation: /-/
- IAST transliteration: ' '
- ISCII code point: EA E9 (60137)

Avagraha (ऽ, IPA: [ɐʋɐɡrɐɦɐ]) is a symbol used to indicate prodelision of an अ (a) in many Indian languages like Sanskrit as shown below. It is usually transliterated with an apostrophe in Roman script and, in case of Devanagari, as in the Sanskrit philosophical expression शिवोऽहम् Śivo'ham (Śivaḥ aham), which is a sandhi of (शिवः + अहम्) ‘I am Shiva’. The avagraha is also used for prolonging vowel sounds in some languages, for example Hindi माँऽऽऽ! for ‘Mā̃ā̃ā̃ā̃!’ when calling to one's mother. This symbol is more frequently used in the Eastern Hindi and Bihari languages especially Bhojpuri language.

In the case of Hindi, the character is also sometimes used as a symbol to denote long or heavy syllables, in metrical poetry. For example, the syllables in the word छंदः chandaḥ ‘metre’ (in nominative) can be denoted as "ऽऽ", meaning two long syllables. (Cf. other notations in entry "Systems of scansion".)

== Glyph comparison ==
Comparison of avagraha in different scripts

Aramaic -
Kharoṣṭhī -	Ashoka Brahmi -	Kushana Brahmi (Note: The middle "Kushana" form of Brahmi is a later style that emerged as Brahmi scripts were beginning to proliferate. Gupta Brahmi was definitely a stylistic descendant from Kushana, but other Brahmi-derived scripts may have descended from earlier forms.) -	Tocharian (Note: Tocharian is probably derived from the middle period "Kushana" form of Brahmi, although artifacts from that time are not plentiful enough to establish a definite succession.) -
Gupta Brahmi -	Pallava -
Kadamba -
Bhaiksuki 𑱀	Siddhaṃ -	Grantha 𑍝	Cham -
Sinhala -	Pyu / Old Mon (Note: Pyu and Old Mon are probably the precursors of the Burmese script, and may be derived from either the Pallava or Kadamba script) -
Tibetan ྅	Newa 𑑇	Ahom -	Malayalam ഽ
Telugu ఽ	Burmese -
Lepcha -	Ranjana -	Saurashtra -	Dives Akuru -
Kannada ಽ	Kayah Li -
Limbu -	Soyombo (Note: May also be derived from Devangari (see bottom left of table)) 𑪝	Khmer ៜ	Tamil -
Chakma -	Tai Tham -
Meitei Mayek -	Gaudi -	Thai -	Lao -
Tai Le -
Marchen -	Tirhuta 𑓄	New Tai Lue -	Tai Viet -	Aksara Kawi -
'Phags-pa -	Odia ଽ	Sharada -	Rejang -	Batak -	Buginese -
Zanabazar Square -	Bengali–Assamese ঽ	Takri -	Javanese -	Balinese -	Makasar -
Hangul (Note: The Origin of Hangul from 'Phags-pa is one of limited influence, inspiring at most a few basic letter shapes. Hangul does not function as an Indic abugida.) -	Northern Nagari -	Dogri -	Laṇḍā -	Sundanese -	Baybayin -
Modi -	Gujarati ઽ	Khojki -	Khudabadi -	Mahajani -	Tagbanwa -
Devanagari ऽ / ꣱	Nandinagari -	Kaithi -	Gurmukhi -	Multani -	Buhid -
Canadian Syllabics (Note: Although the basic letter forms of the Canadian Aboriginal Syllabics were derived from handwritten Devanagari letters, this abugida indicates vowel sounds by rotations of the letter form, rather than the use of vowel diacritics as is standard in Indic abugidas.) -	Soyombo (Note: May also be derived from Ranjana (see above)) 𑪝	Sylheti Nagari -	Gunjala Gondi -	Masaram Gondi (Note: Masaram Gondi acts as an Indic abugida, but its letterforms were not derived from any single precursor script.) -	Hanuno'o -

== Avagraha in Unicode ==
The avagraha symbol is encoded at several Unicode points, for various Brahmic scripts that use it.

Avagraha characters in Unicode
Character	Unicode character number	Full Unicode name
ऽ	U+093D	Devanagari sign avagraha
꣱	U+A8F1	Combining Devanagari sign avagraha
ꣷ	U+A8F7	Devanagari sign candrabindu avagraha
ঽ	U+09BD	Bengali sign avagraha
ઽ	U+0ABD	Gujarati sign avagraha
ଽ	U+0B3D	Odia sign avagraha
ఽ	U+0C3D	Telugu sign avagraha
ಽ	U+0CBD	Kannada sign avagraha
ഽ	U+0D3D	Malayalam sign avagraha
᤹	U+1939	Limbu sign mukphreng
ᮺ	U+1BBA	Sundanese sign avagraha
྅	U+0F85	Tibetan mark paluta
ៜ ‍‍	U+17DC	Khmer sign avakrahasanya
ᢅ	U+1885	Mongolian letter Ali Gali baluda
ᢆ	U+1886	Mongolian letter Ali Gali three baluda
𑍝	U+1135D	Grantha sign pluta
𑑇	U+11447	Newa sign avagraha
𑓄	U+114C4	Tirhuta sign avagraha
𑧡	U+119E1	Nandinagari sign avagraha
𑪝	U+11A9D	Soyombo mark pluta
𑱀	U+11C40	Bhaiksuki sign avagraha
