= Chandrabindu =

Diacritic mark typically denoting nazalization, in Indian abugidas

Candrabindu

Example glyphs
- Bengali–Assamese: ঁ
- Tibetan: ྃ
- Malayalam: ഁ
- Ashoka Brahmi: 𑀀
- Devanagari: ँ

Properties
- Phonemic representation: /-/
- IAST transliteration: m̐ M̐
- ISCII code point: A1 (161)

Chandrabindu (Sanskrit: चन्द्रबिन्दु; IAST: candrabindu, lit. 'moon dot') is a diacritic sign with the form of a dot inside the lower half of a circle. It is used in the Devanagari (ँ), Bengali-Assamese (ঁ), Gujarati (ઁ), Odia (ଁ), Tamil (◌𑌁 Extension used from Grantha), Telugu (ఁ), Kannada (◌ಁ), Malayalam (◌ഁ), Sinhala (◌ඁ), Javanese ( ꦀ) and other scripts.

It usually means that the previous vowel is nasalized.

In Hindi, it is replaced in writing by anusvara when it is written above a consonant that carries a vowel symbol that extends above the top line.

In Classical Sanskrit, it seems to occur only over a lla, yya, or vva conjunct consonant, to show that it is pronounced as a nasalized double l, y, or v which occurs if they have become assimilated in sandhi.

In Vedic Sanskrit, it is used instead of anusvara to represent the sound anunasika when the next word starts with a vowel. It usually occurs where in earlier times a word ended in -ans.

== Glyph comparison ==
Comparison of candrabindu in different scripts

Aramaic -
Kharoṣṭhī -	Ashoka Brahmi 𑀀	Kushana Brahmi (Note: The middle "Kushana" form of Brahmi is a later style that emerged as Brahmi scripts were beginning to proliferate. Gupta Brahmi was definitely a stylistic descendant from Kushana, but other Brahmi-derived scripts may have descended from earlier forms.) 𑀀	Tocharian (Note: Tocharian is probably derived from the middle period "Kushana" form of Brahmi, although artifacts from that time are not plentiful enough to establish a definite succession.) -
Gupta Brahmi 𑀀	Pallava -
Kadamba -
Bhaiksuki 𑰼	Siddhaṃ 𑖼	Grantha 𑌁 / 𑍞 / 𑍟	Cham -
Sinhala -	Pyu / Old Mon (Note: Pyu and Old Mon are probably the precursors of the Burmese script, and may be derived from either the Pallava or Kadamba script) -
Tibetan ྃ / ྂ	Newa 𑑃 / 𑑟	Ahom -	Malayalam ഁ / ഄ
Telugu ఁ / ఀ	Burmese -
Lepcha ᰴ / ᰵ	Ranjana -	Saurashtra ꣅ	Dives Akuru 𑤼
Kannada ಁ / ಀ	Kayah Li -
Limbu -	Soyombo (Note: May also be derived from Devangari (see bottom left of table)) -	Khmer -	Tamil -
Chakma 𑄀	Tai Tham -
Meitei Mayek -	Gaudi -	Thai -	Lao -
Tai Le -
Marchen 𑲶	Tirhuta 𑒿	New Tai Lue -	Tai Viet -	Aksara Kawi 𑼀
'Phags-pa ꡳ	Odia ଁ	Sharada 𑇏	Rejang -	Batak -	Buginese -
Zanabazar Square 𑨵 / 𑨶 / 𑨷	Bengali–Assamese ঁ / ৼ	Takri -	Javanese ꦀ	Balinese ᬁ / ᬀ	Makasar -
Hangul (Note: The Origin of Hangul from 'Phags-pa is one of limited influence, inspiring at most a few basic letter shapes. Hangul does not function as an Indic abugida.) -	Northern Nagari -	Dogri -	Laṇḍā -	Sundanese -	Baybayin -
Modi -	Gujarati ઁ	Khojki -	Khudabadi -	Mahajani -	Tagbanwa -
Devanagari ँ / ऀ / ꣲ / ꣳ / ꣴ	Nandinagari -	Kaithi 𑂀	Gurmukhi ਁ / ੰ	Multani -	Buhid -
Canadian Syllabics (Note: Although the basic letter forms of the Canadian Aboriginal Syllabics were derived from handwritten Devanagari letters, this abugida indicates vowel sounds by rotations of the letter form, rather than the use of vowel diacritics as is standard in Indic abugidas.) -	Soyombo (Note: May also be derived from Ranjana (see above)) -	Sylheti Nagari -	Gunjala Gondi -	Masaram Gondi (Note: Masaram Gondi acts as an Indic abugida, but its letterforms were not derived from any single precursor script.) -	Hanuno'o -

== Unicode ==
Unicode encodes chandrabindu and chandrabindu-like characters for a variety of scripts:

- U+0901 ँ DEVANAGARI SIGN CANDRABINDU
- U+A8F2 ꣲ DEVANAGARI SIGN SPACING CANDRABINDU
- U+A8F3 ꣳ DEVANAGARI SIGN CANDRABINDU VIRAMA
- U+0900 ऀ DEVANAGARI SIGN INVERTED CANDRABINDU
- U+0A01 ਁ GURMUKHI SIGN ADAK BINDI
- U+0A70 ੰ GURMUKHI TIPPI
- U+0C80 ಀ KANNADA SIGN SPACING CANDRABINDU
- U+0C81 ಁ KANNADA SIGN CANDRABINDU
- U+0C01 ఁ TELUGU SIGN CANDRABINDU
- U+0C00 ఀ TELUGU SIGN COMBINING CANDRABINDU ABOVE
- U+0981 ঁ BENGALI SIGN CANDRABINDU
- U+0B01 ଁ ORIYA SIGN CANDRABINDU
- U+0D01 ഁ MALAYALAM SIGN CANDRABINDU
- U+0A81 ઁ GUJARATI SIGN CANDRABINDU
- U+11000 𑀀 BRAHMI SIGN CANDRABINDU
- U+115BC 𑖼 SIDDHAM SIGN CANDRABINDU
- U+11301 𑌁 GRANTHA SIGN CANDRABINDU
- U+11F00 𑼀 KAWI SIGN CANDRABINDU
- U+0F82 ྂ TIBETAN SIGN NYI ZLA NAA DA
- U+0F83 ྃ TIBETAN SIGN SNA LDAN
- U+A873 ꡳ PHAGS-PA LETTER CANDRABINDU
- U+11443 𑑃 NEWA SIGN CANDRABINDU
- U+11C3C 𑰼 BHAIKSUKI SIGN CANDRABINDU
- U+111CF 𑇏 SHARADA SIGN INVERTED CANDRABINDU
- U+1193C 𑤼 DIVES AKURU SIGN CANDRABINDU
- U+A8C5 ꣅ SAURASHTRA SIGN CANDRABINDU
- U+11080 𑂀 KAITHI SIGN CANDRABINDU
- U+114BF 𑒿 TIRHUTA SIGN CANDRABINDU
- U+11CB6 𑲶 MARCHEN SIGN CANDRABINDU
- U+1B01 ᬁ BALINESE SIGN ULU CANDRA
- U+1B00 ᬀ BALINESE SIGN ULU RICEM
- U+1C34 ᰴ LEPCHA CONSONANT SIGN NYIN-DO
- U+1C35 ᰵ LEPCHA CONSONANT SIGN KANG
- U+11A35 𑨵 ZANABAZAR SQUARE SIGN CANDRABINDU
- U+11A36 𑨶 ZANABAZAR SQUARE SIGN CANDRABINDU WITH ORNAMENT
- U+11A37 𑨷 ZANABAZAR SQUARE SIGN CANDRA WITH ORNAMENT
- U+0310 ◌̐ COMBINING CANDRABINDU is a general-purpose combining diacritical mark intended for use with Latin letters in transliteration of Indic languages.

== See also ==
- Anusvara – Diacritic in Indic scripts
- Fermata – Symbol of musical notation
