= Anusvara =

Diacritic in Indic scripts

Example glyphs
- Bengali–Assamese: ং
- Tibetan: ཾ
- Thai: ํ
- Malayalam: ം
- Sinhala: ං
- Ashoka Brahmi: 𑀁
- Devanagari: ं

Properties
- Phonemic representation: /◌̃/ /ŋ/ /m/
- IAST transliteration: ḥ Ḥ
- ISCII code point: A2 (162)

Anusvara (/ˌænʊˈsvɑːrə/ AN-uu-SVAR-ə; Sanskrit: अनुस्वार, IAST: anusvāra, IPA: [ɐn̪usʋaːrɐ]), also known as Bindu (/ˈbɪndu/ BIN-doo; Hindi: बिन्दु [bɪn̪d̪uː]; Bengali: বিন্দু [bin.d̪u]), is a symbol used in many Indic scripts to mark a type of nasal sound, typically transliterated ⟨ṁ⟩ or ⟨ṃ⟩ in standards like ISO 15919 and IAST. Depending on its location in a word and the language for which it is used, its exact pronunciation can vary. In the context of ancient Sanskrit, anusvara is the name of the particular nasal sound itself, regardless of written representation.

== Sanskrit ==
In Vedic Sanskrit, the anusvāra (lit. 'after-sound' or 'subordinate sound') was an allophonic (derived) nasal sound.

The exact nature of the sound has been subject to debate. The material in the various ancient phonetic treatises points towards different phonetic interpretations, and these discrepancies have historically been attributed to either differences in the description of the same pronunciation or to dialectal or diachronic variation. In a 2013 reappraisal of the evidence, Cardona concludes that these reflect real dialectal differences.

The environments in which the anusvara could arise, however, were well defined. In the earliest Vedic Sanskrit, it was an allophone of /m/ at a morpheme boundary, or of /n/ within morphemes, when it was preceded by a vowel and followed by a fricative (/ś/, /ṣ/, /s/, /h/). In later Sanskrit its use expanded to other contexts, first before /r/ under certain conditions, then, in Classical Sanskrit, before /v/ and /y/.

Later still, Pāṇini gave anusvara as an alternative pronunciation as word-final sandhi, and later treatises also prescribed it at morpheme junctions and within morphemes. In the later written language, the diacritic used to represent anusvara was optionally used to indicate a nasal stop having the same place of articulation as a following plosive, which was written in some evolved scripts (e.g. in Bengali-Assamese) as an additional sandhi letter (no longer as a diacritic) for Vedic transcriptions of Sanskrit, to distinguish it with the anusvara diacritic that was used to transcribe other phonemes.

== Languages using the Devanagari script ==
In the Devanagari script, anusvāra is represented with a dot (bindu) above the letter (e.g. मं). In the International Alphabet of Sanskrit Transliteration (IAST), the corresponding symbol is ṃ (m with an underdot). Some transcriptions render notation of phonetic variants used in some Vedic shakhas with variant transcription (ṁ).

In writing Sanskrit, the anusvara is often used as an alternative representation of the nasal stop with the same place of articulation as the following plosive. For example, [əŋɡə] 'limb (of the body)' may be written with either a conjunct, अङ्ग aṅga, or with an anusvara, अंग aṃga. A variant of the anusvara, the anunāsika or 'chandrabindu', was used more explicitly for nasalized vowels, as in अँश aṃśa for [ə̃ɕə] 'portion'.

=== Hindi ===
In Standard Hindi, the anusvāra is traditionally defined as representing a nasal consonant homorganic to a following plosive, in contrast to the candrabindu (anunāsika), which indicates vowel nasalization. In practice, however, the two are often used interchangeably.

The precise phonetic value of the phoneme, whether it is represented by anusvāra or candrabindu, is dependent on the phonological environment.

Word-finally, it is realized as nasalization of the preceding vowel: kuṃā [kʊ̃ãː], "a well". It results in vowel nasalization also medially between a short vowel and a non-obstruent (kuṃvar [kʊ̃ʋər] "a youth", gaṃṛāsā [ɡə̃ɽaːsaː] "a long-handled axe") and, in native words, between a long vowel and a voiceless plosive (dāṃt [dãːt] "tooth", sāṃp [sãːp] "a snake", pūṃch [pũːtʃʰ] "tail").

It is pronounced as a homorganic nasal, with the preceding vowel becoming nasalized allophonically, in the following cases: between a long vowel and a voiced plosive (tāṃbā [taːmbaː] "copper", cāṃdī [tʃaːndiː] "silver"), between a long vowel and a voiceless plosive in loanwords (dāṃt [daːnt] "repressed", bêṃk [bæːŋk] "a bank", xazāṃcī [xəzaːɲtʃiː] "cashier"), and between a short vowel and an obstruent (saṃbhāl- [səmbʱaːl] "to support", saṃdūk [sənduːk] "a chest").

The last rule has two sets of exceptions in which the anusvāra results only in the nasalization of the preceding short vowel. Words from the first set are morphologically derived from words with a long nasalized vowel (baṃṭ- [bə̃ʈ], "to be divided" from bāṃṭ- [bãʈ], "to divide"; siṃcāī [sɪ̃tʃai], "irrigation" from sīṃc- [sĩːtʃ], "to irrigate"). In such cases, the vowel is sometimes denasalized ([bəʈ], [sɪtʃai] instead of [bə̃ʈ-], [sɪ̃tʃai]). The second set is composed of a few words like (pahuṃc- [pahʊ̃tʃ], "to arrive" and haṃs- [hə̃s], "to laugh"). (Note: Ohala (1983, p. 90) lists five more such words: dhaṃs- "to sink", phaṃs- "to be stuck", haṃslī "a necklace", haṃsiyā "a sickle" and haṃsī "laughter".)

=== Marathi ===
In Marathi, the anusvāra is pronounced as a nasal that is homorganic to the following consonant (with the same place of articulation). For example, it is pronounced as the dental nasal न् before dental consonants, as the bilabial nasal म् before bilabial consonants, etc. Before the letter य (ya) it is pronounced as a nasalised voiced palatal approximant ⟨j̃⟩ while before liquids and sibilants it is pronounced as a nasalised voiced labial-velar approximant ⟨w̃⟩. Unlike in other Indic languages, the same dot designating the anusvāra in Marathi is also used to mark a retention of the inherent vowel [ə] (It is inconsistently placed over a consonant after which the short central vowel (ə) is to be pronounced and not elided).

=== Nepali ===
In Nepali, the candrabindu indicates vowel nasalization. Therefore, there is a great deal of variation regarding which occurs in any given position. Many words containing anusvara thus have alternative spellings with a chandrabindu instead of the anusvāra and vice versa. Anusvara is used when there is too little space for the chandrabindu. The anusvāra can represent a nasal vowel, a homoorganic nasal, or both.

== Other languages using Indic scripts ==
Anusvara is used in other languages using Indic scripts as well, usually to represent suprasegmental phones (such as phonation type or nasalization) or other nasal sounds.

=== Bengali ===

In the Bengali alphabet, the anusvara diacritic (Bengali: অনুস্বার, romanized: ônuśśar) is written as a circle above a slanted line (ং), and represents coda /ŋ/. It is used in the name of the Bengali language বাংলা [baŋla] and has merged in pronunciation with the letter ঙ ungô in Bengali.

Although the anusvara is a consonant in Bengali phonology, it is treated in the written system as a diacritic in that it is always directly adjacent to the preceding consonant, even when consonants are spaced apart in titles or banners: বাং-লা-দে-শ baṅ-la-de-ś, not বা-ং-লা-দে-শ ba-ṅ-la-de-ś for বাংলাদেশ Bangladesh. It is never pronounced with the inherent vowel 'ô' (/ɔ/ or /o/), and it cannot take a vowel sign (instead, the consonant ঙ uṅô is used before vowels).

=== Burmese ===
In the Burmese alphabet, the anusvara (အောက်မြစ် auk myit (့) IPA: [aʊʔ mjɪʔ]) is represented as a dot under a nasalised final to indicate a creaky tone (with a shortened vowel).

Burmese also uses a dot above a letter to indicate the /-ɴ/ nasalized ending (called "Myanmar Sign Anusvara" in Unicode), called သေးသေးတင် thay thay tin (IPA: [θé ðé tɪ̀ɰ̃]) (ံ)

=== Sinhala ===
In the Sinhala script, the anusvara is not a nonspacing combining mark but a spacing combining mark. It has a circular shape and follows its base letter ( ං). It is called binduva in Sinhala, which means "dot". The anusvara represents /ŋ/ at the end of a syllable. It is used in the name of the Sinhala language සිංහල [ˈsiŋɦələ]. It has merged in pronunciation with the letter ඞ ṅa in Sinhala.

=== Telugu ===
The Telugu script has full-zero (sunna) ం, half-zero (arasunna) and visarga to convey various shades of nasal sounds. Anusvara is represented as a circle shape after a letter: క - ka and కం - kam.

=== Malayalam ===
In the Malayalam script, the anusvāram (Malayalam: അനുസ്വാരം, /ɐnusʋäːɾɐm/) or anusvara (ം) represents the consonant sound /m/ after a vowel, though this /m/ can assimilate to another consonant. It is defined as a special character that, unlike a normal consonant, is never followed by an inherent vowel. In ISO 15919, the Malayalam anusvara in the final position of a word is transliterated as m, without a dot.

=== Thai ===
The equivalent of the anusvara in the Thai alphabet is the nikkhahit (◌ํ). Used in rendering Sanskrit and Pali texts, it is written as an open circle above the consonant (for example อํ). Its pronunciation depends on the following sound: if it is a consonant, the nikkhahit is pronounced as a homorganic nasal, and if it is at the end of a word, it is pronounced as a voiced velar nasal /ŋ/.

== Anunasika ==
Anunasika (anunāsika) is a form of vowel nasalization, often represented by an anusvara. It is a form of open-mouthed nasalization, akin to the nasalization of vowels followed by "n" or "m" in Parisian French. When "n" or "m" follows a vowel, the "n" or "m" becomes silent and causes the preceding vowel to become nasal (it is pronounced with the soft palate extended downward to allow part or all of the air to leave through the nostrils). Anunasika is sometimes called a subdot because of its IAST representation.

In Devanagari and related scripts, the anunasika is represented by the chandrabindu diacritic (example: माँ).

In Burmese, the anunasika, called သေးသေးတင် (IPA: [θé ðé tɪ̀ɰ̃]) and represented as ⟨ံ⟩, creates the /-ɰ̃/ nasalized ending when it is attached as a dot above a letter. The anunasika represents the -m final in Pali.

== Glyph comparison ==
Comparison of anusvara in different scripts

Aramaic -
Kharoṣṭhī 𐨎	Ashoka Brahmi 𑀁	Kushana Brahmi (Note: The middle "Kushana" form of Brahmi is a later style that emerged as Brahmi scripts were beginning to proliferate. Gupta Brahmi was definitely a stylistic descendant from Kushana, but other Brahmi-derived scripts may have descended from earlier forms.) 𑀁	Tocharian (Note: Tocharian is probably derived from the middle period "Kushana" form of Brahmi, although artifacts from that time are not plentiful enough to establish a definite succession.) -
Gupta Brahmi 𑀁	Pallava -
Kadamba -
Bhaiksuki 𑰽	Siddhaṃ 𑖽	Grantha 𑌂 / 𑌀	Cham ꩌ
Sinhala ං	Pyu / Old Mon (Note: Pyu and Old Mon are probably the precursors of the Burmese script, and may be derived from either the Pallava or Kadamba script) -
Tibetan ཾ	Newa 𑑄	Ahom 𑜪	Malayalam ം / ഀ
Telugu ం / ఄ	Burmese ံ
Lepcha -	Ranjana -	Saurashtra ꢀ	Dives Akuru 𑤻
Kannada ಂ / ೳ	Kayah Li -
Limbu ᤲ	Soyombo (Note: May also be derived from Devangari (see bottom left of table)) 𑪖	Khmer ំ	Tamil ஂ
Chakma 𑄁	Tai Tham ᩴ
Meitei Mayek -	Gaudi -	Thai ํ	Lao ໍ
Tai Le -
Marchen 𑲵	Tirhuta 𑓀	New Tai Lue -	Tai Viet -	Aksara Kawi 𑼁
'Phags-pa -	Odia ଂ	Sharada 𑆁	Rejang -	Batak -	Buginese -
Zanabazar Square 𑨸	Bengali–Assamese ং	Takri 𑚫	Javanese ꦁ	Balinese ᬂ	Makasar -
Hangul (Note: The Origin of Hangul from 'Phags-pa is one of limited influence, inspiring at most a few basic letter shapes. Hangul does not function as an Indic abugida.) -	Northern Nagari -	Dogri 𑠷	Laṇḍā -	Sundanese ᮀ	Baybayin -
Modi 𑘽	Gujarati ં	Khojki 𑈴	Khudabadi 𑋟	Mahajani -	Tagbanwa -
Devanagari ं	Nandinagari 𑧞	Kaithi 𑂁	Gurmukhi ਂ	Multani -	Buhid -
Canadian Syllabics (Note: Although the basic letter forms of the Canadian Aboriginal Syllabics were derived from handwritten Devanagari letters, this abugida indicates vowel sounds by rotations of the letter form, rather than the use of vowel diacritics as is standard in Indic abugidas.) -	Soyombo (Note: May also be derived from Ranjana (see above)) 𑪖	Sylheti Nagari ꠋ	Gunjala Gondi 𑶕	Masaram Gondi (Note: Masaram Gondi acts as an Indic abugida, but its letterforms were not derived from any single precursor script.) 𑵀	Hanuno'o -

== Unicode ==
Unicode encodes anusvara and anusvara-like characters for a variety of scripts:

South Asian scripts
Script	Sign	Example	Unicode
Bengali	ং	কং	U+0982
Bengali (combining above)	𑷰	ক𑷰	U+11DF0
Bengali Vedic	ৼ		U+09FC
Bhaiksuki	𑰽	𑰎𑰽	U+11C3D
Brahmi	𑀁	𑀓𑀁	U+11001
Chakma	𑄁	𑄇𑄁	U+11101
Devanagari	ं	कं	U+0902
Devanagari Vedic	ꣳ		U+A8F3
Devanagari Vedic Double	ꣴ		U+A8F4
Dhives Akuru	𑤻	𑤌𑤻	U+1193B
Dogra	𑠷	𑠊𑠷	U+11837
Grantha	𑌂	𑌕𑌂	U+11302
Grantha Vedic	𑍞		U+1135E
Grantha Vedic (double)	𑍟		U+1135F
Grantha (combining above)	𑌀	𑌕𑌀	U+11300
Gujarati	ં	કં	U+0A82
Gunjala Gondi	𑶕	𑵱𑶕	U+11D95
Gurmukhi	ਂ	ਕਂ	U+0A02
Gurung Khema	𖄭	𖄁𖄭	U+1612D
Kaithi	𑂁	𑂍𑂁	U+11081
Kannada	ಂ	ಕಂ	U+0C82
Kannada (combining above right)	ೳ	ಕೳ	U+0CF3
Kharosthi	𐨎	𐨐𐨎	U+10A0E
Khojki	𑈴	𑈈𑈴	U+11234
Khudabadi	𑋟	𑊺𑋟	U+112DF
Kirat Rai	𖵀	𖵛𖵣𖵀	U+16D40
Malayalam	ം	കം	U+0D02
Malayalam (combining above)	ഀ	കഀ	U+0D00
Malayalam Vedic	ഄ		U+0D04
Marchen	𑲵	𑱲𑲵	U+11CB5
Masaram Gondi	𑵀	𑴌𑵀	U+11D40
Modi	𑘽	𑘎𑘽	U+1163D
Mongolian	ᢀ᠋	ᢀ᠋ᠠ᠋	U+1880
Nandinagari	𑧞	𑦮𑧞	U+119DE
Odia	ଂ	କଂ	U+0B02
Prachalit Nepal	𑑄	𑐎𑑄	U+11444
Prachalit Nepal (Vedic)	𑑟		U+1145F
Sharada	𑆁	𑆑𑆁	U+11181
Saurashtra	ꢀ	ꢒꢀ	U+A880
Siddham	𑖽	𑖎𑖽	U+115BD
Sinhala	ං	කං	U+0D82
Soyombo	𑪖	𑩜𑪖	U+11A96
Sylheti Nagari	ꠋ	ꠇꠋ	U+A80B
Takri	𑚫	𑚊𑚫	U+116AB
Tamil	◌ஂ	கஂ	U+0B82
Telugu	ం	కం	U+0C02
Telugu (Prakrit) (combining above)	ఄ	కఄ	U+0C04
Tibetan (rjes su nga ro)	ཾ	ཀཾ	U+0F7E
Tirhuta	𑓀	𑒏𑓀	U+114C0
Zanabazar Square	𑨸	𑨋𑨸	U+11A38

Southeast Asian scripts
Script	Sign	Example	Unicode
Balinese	ᬂ	ᬓᬂ	U+1B02
Burmese	ံ	ကံ	U+1036
Javanese	ꦁ	ꦏꦁ	U+A981
Kawi	𑼁	𑼒𑼁	U+11F01
Khmer	ំ	កំ	U+17C6
Lao	ໍ	ກໍ	U+0ECD
Sundanese	ᮀ	ᮊᮀ	U+1B80
Tai Tham (mai kang)	ᩴ	ᨠᩴ	U+1A74
Thai	ํ	กํ	U+0E4D

== See also ==
- Chandrabindu
- Tilde
- Ogonek

== Bibliography ==
- Allen, W.S. (1953), Phonetics in ancient India, OUP
- Cardona, George (2013). "Developments of nasals in early Indo-Aryan : anunāsika and anusvāra". Tokyo University Linguistic Papers. 33: 3–81. ISSN 1345-8663.
- Emeneau, M. B. (1946). "The Nasal Phonemes of Sanskrit". Language. 22 (2): 86–93. doi:10.2307/410341. JSTOR 410341.
- Ohala, Manjari (1983), Aspects of Hindi Phonology, Motilal Banarsidass, ISBN 0-89581-670-9
- Varma, Siddheshwar (1961) [1927]. Critical studies in the phonetic observations of Indian grammarians. James G. Forlong Fund. Delhi: Munshi Ram Manohar Lal.
