= Romanisation of Bengali =

Representation of written Bengali language in the Roman script

Romanisation of Bengali is the representation of written Bengali in the Latin script. Various romanisation systems for Bengali are used, most of which do not perfectly represent Bengali phonology. While different standards for romanisation have been proposed for Bengali, none has been adopted with the same degree of uniformity as Japanese or Sanskrit. (Note: In Japanese, some debate exists as to whether to accent certain distinctions, such as Tōhoku vs Tohoku. Sanskrit is well standardised, as it has few speakers, and sound change is not a large concern.)

The Bengali script has been included with the group of Indic scripts whose romanisation does not represent the phonetic value of Bengali. Some of them are the "International Alphabet of Sanskrit Transliteration" or IAST system (based on diacritics), "Indian languages Transliteration" or ITRANS (uses upper case alphabets suited for ASCII keyboards), and the National Library at Calcutta romanisation.

In the context of Bengali romanisation, it is important to distinguish transliteration from transcription. Transliteration is orthographically accurate (the original spelling can be recovered), but transcription is phonetically accurate (the pronunciation can be reproduced). English does not have all sounds of Bengali, and pronunciation does not completely reflect orthography. The aim of romanisation is not the same as phonetic transcription. Rather, romanisation is a representation of one writing system in the Latin script. For instance, Bengali অ corresponds to Sanskrit अ and is transliterated as a using the ISO 15919 system; however, the vowel is pronounced as /ɔ~o/ in Bengali (and in other Eastern Indo-Aryan languages) and not as /ɐ~ə/ as in Sanskrit and most other Indo-Aryan languages. The ISO 15919 system is strictly a transliteration scheme specifically designed for all Brahmi-derived scripts, and hence does not fully reflect historical sound changes and phonemic differences across languages. The writing systems of many languages do not faithfully represent the spoken sounds of the language, as with English words like enough, women, or nation (see "ghoti").

== History ==
Portuguese missionaries stationed in Bengal in the 16th century were the first people to employ the Latin alphabet in writing Bengali books. The most famous are the Crepar Xaxtrer Orth, Bhed and the Vocabolario em idioma Bengalla, e Portuguez dividido em duas partes, both written by Manuel da Assumpção. However, the Portuguese-based romanisation did not take root. In the late 18th century, Augustin Aussant used a romanisation scheme based on the French alphabet. At the same time, Nathaniel Brassey Halhed used a romanisation scheme based on English for his Bengali grammar book. After Halhed, the renowned English philologist and oriental scholar Sir William Jones devised a romanisation scheme for Bengali and other Indian languages in general; he published it in the Asiatick Researches journal in 1801. His scheme came to be known as the "Jonesian system" of romanisation and served as a model for the next century and a half. Professor Lightner of Lahore Government College opposed it. The earliest instance of a long Bengali text printed in the Roman script was a collection of Aesop's Fables titled Oriental Fabulist, published in 1803 in six Indian languages. In 1881 an edition of Bankim Chandra Chatterjee's Durgeshnandini was published in Roman script.

At the beginning of the 20th century, Drew, an assistant professor at Eton College recommended that Indian languages be written in Roman script and for this purpose the magazine called Roman Urdu was launched.

During the 1930s, Suniti Kumar Chatterji suggested that Bengali be written in the Roman script to eliminate spelling inconsistencies and to appeal to a pan-Indian audience. Abul Fazal Muhammad Akhtaru-d-Din, in an article titled "Bangla Bornomalar Poribortton" (বাংলা বর্ণমালার পরিবর্ত্তন; 'Changes in the Bengali Alphabet') published in Daily Azad on 18 April 1949, wrote that Rabindranath Tagore once advocated the Roman alphabet for Bengali, but later he changed his opinion.

=== Bengali language movement ===
During the Bengali language movement of the 1940s and 1950s, a romanisation of Bengali was proposed along with other proposals regarding the determination of the state language of the then-Pakistan. However, like other proposals, it also failed – by establishing Bengali as one of the state languages of Pakistan at the time, with its traditional letters. After 1947, many other East Pakistani academics, including Muhammad Qudrat-i-Khuda and Nazirul Islam Mohammad Sufian, supported the idea of writing Bengali in Roman script. In 1948, Mohammad Ferdous Khan opposed it in his pamphlet "The language problem of today".

Abul Fazl Muhammad Akhtar-ud-Din supported the Roman alphabet in his article "Bangla Bornomalar Poribortton", published in Daily Azad on 18 April 1949.

In 1949 the Language Committee of the East-Bengal Government conducted a survey among teachers, intellectuals, high civil servants, members of the Legislative Council, according to which, out of 301 respondents, 96 favoured the introduction of the Arabic script, 18 the Roman script, and 187 the retention of the Bengali script.

=== After language movement ===
In 1957 the East Pakistan Education Commission recommended the use of the revised Roman script in adult education.

Around 1957 there was another demand for the use of Roman letters for Bengali. Muhammad Abdul Hai and Muhammad Enamul Haque opposed it.

== Transliteration and transcription ==
Romanisation of a language written in a non-Roman script can be based on either transliteration (orthographically accurate and the original spelling can be recovered) or transcription (phonetically accurate, and the pronunciation can be reproduced). The distinction is important in Bengali, as its orthography was adopted from Sanskrit and ignores several millennia of sound change. All writing systems differ at least slightly from the way the language is pronounced, but this is more extreme for languages like Bengali. For example, the three letters শ, ষ, and স had distinct pronunciations in Sanskrit, but over several centuries, the standard pronunciation of Bengali (usually modelled on the Nadia dialect) has lost the phonetic distinctions, and all three are usually pronounced as [ʃɔ]. The spelling distinction persists in orthography.

In written texts, distinguishing between homophones (such as শাপ śāp [ʃap] 'curse', and সাপ sāp [ʃap] 'snake') is easy. Such a distinction could be particularly relevant in searching for the term in an encyclopaedia, for example. However, the fact that the words sound identical means that they could be transcribed identically, so some important distinctions of meaning cannot be rendered by transcription. Another issue with transcription systems is that cross-dialectal and cross-register differences are widespread, so the same word or lexeme may have many different transcriptions, e.g., the word মন man 'mind' may be pronounced [ˈmon], [ˈmɔn], or [ˈmɔnoˑ] in poetry (as in the Indian national anthem "Jana Gana Mana").

Often, different phonemes are represented by the same symbol or grapheme. Thus, the vowel এ (transliterated as ē in the ISO 15919 system) can represent either [e] (e.g., এল [ˈeloˑ] 'came') or [ɛ] (e.g., এক [ˈɛk] 'one'). Occasionally, homographs (i.e., words written in the same way) may have different pronunciations for differing meanings, e.g., মত can mean 'opinion' (pronounced [ˈmɔt̪]), or 'similar to' (pronounced [ˈmɔt̪oˑ]). Therefore, some important distinctions cannot be rendered in a transliteration model. In addition, to represent a Bengali word to allow speakers of other languages to pronounce it easily, it may be better to use a transcription, which does not include the silent letters and other idiosyncrasies that make Bengali romanisation complicated, e.g., স্বাস্থ্য could be transcribed as śastthô rather than sbāsthya for [ˈʃast̪ʰːoˑ], and অজ্ঞান as ôggên rather than ajñāna for [ˈɔɡːæn].

The problem is that several historical sound changes have occurred from Sanskrit to Bengali, particularly various sound mergers, and the Bengali alphabet does not represent those changes. A similar phenomenon can be found in French and Greek.

A phenomenon in which romanisation of Bengali unintentionally leads to humorous results when translated is known as Murad Takla.

== Comparison of romanisations ==
Comparisons of the standard romanisation schemes for Bengali are given in the table below. Two standards are commonly used for transliteration of Indic languages, including Bengali. Many standards (like NLK/ISO), use diacritic marks and permit case markings for proper nouns. Schemes such as the Harvard-Kyoto one are more suited for ASCII-derivative keyboards and use upper- and lower-case letters contrastively, so forgo normal standards for English capitalisation.

- "NLK" stands for the diacritic-based letter-to-letter transliteration schemes, best represented by the National Library at Kolkata romanisation or the ISO 15919, or IAST. It is the ISO standard, and it uses diacritic marks like ā to reflect the additional characters and sounds of Bengali letters.
- ITRANS is an ASCII representation for Sanskrit; it is one-to-many: more than one way of transliterating characters may be used, which can make internet searches more complicated. ITRANS ignores English capitalisation norms to permit representing characters from a normal ASCII keyboard.
- "HK" stands for two other case-sensitive letter-to-letter transliteration schemes: Harvard-Kyoto and XIAST scheme. Both are similar to the ITRANS scheme and use only one form for each character.

=== Vowels ===
Bengali	IAST	ISO 15919	Avro	ITRANS	Devanagari	WX	B.C
অ	a	a	o	a	अ	a	a
আ	ā	ā	a	A/aa	आ	A	aa
ই	i	i	i	i	इ	i	i
ঈ	ī	ī	I	I/ii	ई	I	undefined
উ	u	u	u	u	उ	u	u
ঊ	ū	ū	U	U/uu	ऊ	U	undefined
ঋ	ṛ	r̥	rri	RRi/R^i	ऋ	q	undefined
ৠ	ṝ	r̥̄	-	r̥̄	ॠ	-	undefined
ঌ	ḷ	l̥	-	l̥	ऌ	-	undefined
ৡ	ḹ	l̥̄	-	l̥̄	ॡ	-	undefined
এ	e	ē	e	e	ए	e	e
ঐ	ai	ai	OI	ai	ऐ	E	oi
ও	o	ō	O	o	ओ	o	o
ঔ	au	au	OU	au	औ	O	ou
অ্যা	ae	ê	oZa	-	ऍ	-	ae

=== Consonants ===
Bengali	IAST	ISO 15919	Avro	ITRANS	Devanagari	B.C
ক	ka	ka	k	ka	क	ka
খ	kha	kha	kh	kha	ख	kha
গ	ga	ga	g	ga	ग	ga
ঘ	gha	gha	gh	gha	घ	gha
ঙ	ṅa	ṅa	Ng	~Na	ङ	undefined
চ	ca	ca	c	ca	च	cca
ছ	cha	cha	ch	Cha	छ	cha
জ	ja	ja	j	ja	ज	undefined
ঝ	jha	jha	jh	jha	झ	jha
ঞ	ña	ña	NG	~na	ञ	undefined
ট	ṭa	ṭa	T	Ta	ट	ta
ঠ	ṭha	ṭha	Th	Tha	ठ	tha
ড	ḍa	ḍa	D	Da	ड	da
ঢ	ḍha	ḍha	Dh	Dha	ढ	dha
ণ	ṇa	ṇa	N	Na	ण	undefined
ত	ta	ta	t	ta	त	'ta
থ	tha	tha	th	tha	थ	'tha
দ	da	da	d	da	द	'da
ধ	dha	dha	dh	dha	ध	'dha
ন	na	na	n	na	न	na
প	pa	pa	p	pa	प	pa
ফ	pha	pha	ph/f	pha	फ	pha
ব	ba	ba	b	ba	ब	ba
ভ	bha	bha	bh/v	bha	भ	bha
ম	ma	ma	m	ma	म	ma
য	ya	ya	z	ya	य	ja
র	ra	ra	r	ra	र	ra
ল	la	la	l	la	ल	la
শ	śa	śa	sh/S	sha	श	sha
ষ	ṣa	ṣa	Sh	Sha	ष	undefined
স	sa	sa	s	sa	स	sa
হ	ha	ha	h	ha	ह	ha
ড়	-	ṛa	R	-	ड़	rra
ঢ়	-	ṛha	Rh	-	ढ़	undefined
য়	-	ẏa	y/Y	-	य़	y
ং	ṃ	ṁa			ं	
ঃ	ḥ	ḥa			ः	
ঁ	m̐	m̐a			ঁ	

==== Additional consonants ====
বাংলা	ISO 15919	ITRANS	Devanagari	WX
ক়	qa	qa	क़	kZa
ফ়	fa	fa	फ़	fZa
ভ়	va	va	भ़	vZa
জ়	za	za	ज़	zZa

== Examples ==
The following table includes examples of Bengali words romanised by using the various systems mentioned above.

Example words
Bengali script	Meaning	NLK	ITRANS	HK	Devanagari	IPA
মন	'mind'	man	man	man	मन	[mon]
সাপ	'snake'	sāp	saap	sApa	साप	[ʃap]
শাপ	'curse'	śāp	shaap	zAp	शाप	[ʃap]
মত	'opinion'	mat	ma't	mat	मत	[mɔt]
মতো	'like'	mato	ma'to	mato	मतो	[mɔto]
তেল	'oil'	tēl	'tel	tel	तेल	[tel]
গেল	'went'	gēla	gela	gela	गेल	[ɡɛlɔ]
জ্বর	'fever'	jbar	jbara	jbara	ज्वर	[dʒɔr]
স্বাস্থ্য	'health'	sbāsthya	sbaas'thy	sbAsthy	स्वस्थ्य	[ʃastʰːo]
বাংলাদেশ	'Bangladesh'	bāṃlādēś	baanglaa'desh	bAMlAdez	बांलादेश	[baŋladeʃ]
ব্যঞ্জনধ্বনি	'consonant'	byañjanadhbani	byanjan'dhbani	byaJjanadhbani	ब्यञ्जनध्वनि	[bɛndʒɔndʱoni]
আত্মহত্যা	'suicide'	ātmahatyā	aa'tmaha'tyaa	AtmahatyA	आत्महत्या	[atːohɔtːa]

A detailed example is given below by the lyrics of the "Amar Sonar Bangla" as written by Rabindranath Tagore, the first ten lines of this song currently constitute Bangladesh's national anthem.

Bengali original

আমার সোনার বাংলা, আমি তোমায় ভালোবাসি।
চিরদিন তোমার আকাশ, তোমার বাতাস, আমার প্রাণে বাজায় বাঁশি॥
ও মা, ফাগুনে তোর আমের বনে ঘ্রাণে পাগল করে,
মরি হায়, হায় রে—
ও মা, অঘ্রাণে তোর ভরা ক্ষেতে আমি কী দেখেছি মধুর হাসি॥

কী শোভা, কী ছায়া গো, কী স্নেহ, কী মায়া গো—
কী আঁচল বিছায়েছ বটের মূলে, নদীর কূলে কূলে।
মা, তোর মুখের বাণী আমার কানে লাগে সুধার মতো,
মরি হায়, হায় রে—
মা, তোর বদনখানি মলিন হলে, ও মা, আমি নয়নজলে ভাসি॥

তোমার এই খেলাঘরে শিশুকাল কাটিলে রে,
তোমারি ধুলামাটি অঙ্গে মাখি ধন্য জীবন মানি।
তুই দিন ফুরালে সন্ধ্যাকালে কী দীপ জ্বালিস ঘরে,
মরি হায়, হায় রে—
তখন খেলাধুলা সকল ফেলে, ও মা, তোমার কোলে ছুটে আসি॥

ধেনু-চরা তোমার মাঠে, পারে যাবার খেয়াঘাটে আমার সোনার বাংলা ,
সারা দিন পাখি-ডাকা ছায়ায়-ঢাকা তোমার পল্লীবাটে,
তোমার ধানে-ভরা আঙিনাতে জীবনের দিন কাটে,
মরি হায়, হায় রে—
ও মা, আমার যে ভাই তারা সবাই, ও মা, তোমার রাখাল তোমার চাষি॥

ও মা, তোর চরণেতে দিলেম এই মাথা পেতে—
দে গো তোর পায়ের ধুলা, সে যে আমার মাথার মানিক হবে।
ও মা, গরিবের ধন যা আছে তাই দিব চরণতলে,
মরি হায়, হায় রে—
আমি পরের ঘরে কিনব না আর, মা, তোর ভূষণ ব'লে গলার ফাঁসি

Romanisation of Bengali

Amar shōnar Bangla, ami tōmay bhalōbashi.
Cirodin tōmar akash, tōmar batash, amar prane bajay bãshi.
Ō ma, phagune tōr amer bone ghrane pagol kore,
Mori hay, hay re:
Ō ma, Oghrane tōr bhora khete ami ki dekhechi modhur hashi.

Ki shōbha, ki chaya gō, ki sneho, ki maya gō,
Ki ãcol bichayecho boṭer mule, nodir kule kule.
Ma, tōr mukher bani amar kane lage shudhar motō,
Mori hay, hay re:
Ma, tōr bodonkhani molin hole, ō ma, ami noyonjole bhashi.

Tōmar ei khelaghore shishukal kaṭile re,
Tōmari dhulamaṭi ongge makhi dhonno jibon mani.
Tui din phurale shondhakale ki dip jalish ghore,
Mori hay, hay re:
Tokhon kheladhula shokol phele, ō ma, tōmar kōle chuṭe ashi.

Dhenu-cora tōmar maṭhe, pare jabar kheyaghaṭe,
Shara din pakhi-ḍaka chayay-ḍhaka tōmar pollibaṭe,
Tōmar dhane-bhora anginate jiboner din kaṭe
Mori hay, hay re:
Ō ma, amar je bhai tara shobai, ō ma, tōmar rakhal tōmar cashi.

Ō ma, tōr coronete dilem ei matha pete:
De gō tōr payer dhula, she je amar mathar manik hobe.
Ō ma, goriber dhon ja ache tai dib corontole,
Mori hay, hay re:
Ami porer ghore kinbo na ar, ma, tōr bhushon bole golar phãshi.

IPA transcription (Note: See Help:IPA/Bengali and Bengali phonology.)

[a.mar ʃo.nar baŋ.la ǀ a.mi to.maj bʱa.lo.ba.ʃi]
[t͡ʃi.ro.din to.mar a.kaʃ ǀ to.mar ba.taʃ ǀ a.mar pra.ne ba.d͡ʒaj bã.ʃi ‖]
[o ma ǀ pʰa.gu.ne tor a.mer bo.ne gʱra.ne pa.gol kɔ.re ǀ]
[mo.ri haj ǀ haj re ǀ]
[o ma ǀ ɔ.gʱra.ne tor bʱɔ.ra kʰe.te a.mi ki de.kʰe.t͡ʃʰi mo.dʱur ha.ʃi ‖]

[ki ʃo.bʱa ǀ ki t͡ʃʰa.ja go ǀ ki sne.ho ǀ ki ma.ja go ǀ]
[ki ã.t͡ʃol bi.t͡ʃʰa.je.t͡ʃʰo bɔ.ʈer mu.le ǀ no.dir ku.le ku.le]
[ma ǀ tor mu.kʰer ba.ni a.mar ka.ne la.ge ʃu.dʱar mɔ.to ǀ]
[mo.ri haj ǀ haj re ǀ]
[ma ǀ tor bɔ.don.kʰa.ni mo.lin ho.le ǀ o ma ǀ a.mi nɔ.jon.d͡ʒɔ.le bʱa.ʃi ‖]

[to.mar ei kʰɛ.la.gʱɔ.re ʃi.ʃu.kal ka.ʈi.le re ǀ]
[to.ma.ri dʱu.la.ma.ʈi ɔŋ.ge ma.kʰi dʱon.no d͡ʒi.bɔn ma.ni]
[tu.i din pʰu.ra.le ʃon.dʱa.ka.le ki dip d͡ʒa.liʃ gʱɔ.re ǀ]
[mo.ri haj ǀ haj re ǀ]
[tɔ.kʰon kʰɛ.la.dʱu.la ʃɔ.kol pʰe.le ǀ o ma ǀ to.mar ko.le t͡ʃʰu.ʈe a.ʃi ‖]

[dʱe.nu.t͡ʃɔ.ra to.mar ma.ʈʰe ǀ pa.re d͡ʒa.bar kʰe.ja.gʱa.ʈe ǀ]
[ʃa.ra din pa.kʰi.ɖa.ka t͡ʃʰa.jaj.ɖʱa.ka to.mar pol.li.bʱa.ʈe ǀ]
[to.mar dʱa.ne.bʱɔ.ra aŋ.i.na.te d͡ʒi.bɔ.ner din ka.ʈe]
[mo.ri haj ǀ haj re ǀ]
[o ma ǀ a.mar d͡ʒe bʱa.i ta.ra ʃɔ.bai̯ ǀ o ma ǀ to.mar ra.kʰal to.mar t͡ʃa.ʃi ‖]

[o ma ǀ tor t͡ʃɔ.ro.ne.te di.lem ei̯ ma.tʰa pe.te ǀ]
[de go tor pa.jer dʱu.la ǀ ʃe d͡ʒe a.mar ma.tʰar ma.nik hɔ.be]
[o ma ǀ go.ri.ber dʱɔn d͡ʒa a.t͡ʃʰe tai̯ di.bo t͡ʃɔ.ron.tɔ.le ǀ]
[mo.ri haj ǀ haj re ǀ]
[a.mi pɔ.rer gʱɔ.re kin.bo na ar ǀ ma ǀ tor bʱu.ʃon bo.le gɔ.lar pʰã.ʃi ‖]

Some sentence examples are:

Literal Bengali script	Romanization of Bengali script	Literal meaning in English
আপনার ছেলে কেমন আছে?	Apnar Cchele Kemon Acchey?	How is your son?
পৃথিবী ঘুরে।	Prithibi Ghorey.	The Earth is spinning.
জোয়ার ভাটা।	Joar Bhata.	High and low tide.
তোমায় মনে পড়ে।	Tomay Money Porrey.	Reminds me of you.
চোখ দিয়ে জল পরছে।	Chokh Diye Jol Porcchey.	There are tears in my eyes.
দূরে চলে গেলে সবাই ভুলে যায়। কাছে থাকলে সবাই মনে রাখে, এটাই জীবন।	Durey Geley Shobai Bhuley Jay, Kacchey Thakley Money Rakhey, Etai Jibon.	When you're far away, people forget you. When you're near, they remember you, this is life.
জীবনটা পাশা খেলা হয়ে গেল।	Jibonta pasha khela hoye gelo.	My life has become a dice game.
যখন রাত্রি নিঝুম, নাই চোখে ঘুম, একলা শুন্য ঘরে, তোমায় মনে পড়ে আমার, তোমায় মনে পড়ে।	Jokhon Ratri Nijhum, Nai Chokhey Ghum, Ekla Shunno Ghorey, Tomay Money Porrey Amar, Tomay Money Porrey.	When the night is gloomy, no sleep in my eyes, I remember of you my lord, I remember of you.

=== Bengali Nursery Rhymes (Chharā) ===
Literal Bengali script	Romanization of Bengali script	Literal meaning in English
ঘুমপাড়ানি মাসি-পিসি মোদের বাড়ি এসো, খাট নাই পালঙ্ক নাই খোকার চোখে বোসো। বাটা ভরে পান দেব গাল ভরে খেয়ো, খোকার চোখে ঘুম নাই ঘুম দিয়ে যেয়ো।	Ghumpāṛāni māsi-piśi mōdēr bāṛi ēśō, khāṭ nāi pālaṅg nāi khōkār chōkhē bōsō. Bāṭā bhōrē pān dēbo gāl bhōrē khē’ō, Khōkār chōkhē ghum nāi ghuma diẏē zē’ō.	Oh sleep-inducing aunts! Come to our home, There is no cot or bed, so be seated on the child's eyes. A tray full of betel leaf will be served, eat them with a full mouth, Sleep has gone from the child's eyes, grant him some sleep.

Literal Bengali script	Romanization of Bengali script	Literal meaning in English
ছেলে ঘুমালো, পাড়া জুড়ালো, বর্গী এল দেশে বুলবুলিতে ধান খেয়েছে, খাজনা দেব কিসে।। ধান ফুরল, পান ফুরল, খাজনার উপায় কি? আর ক’টা দিন সবুর কর, রসুন বুনেছি।।	Chhele ghumalo para juralo bərgi elo deshe, Bulbulite dhan kheyechhe khajna debo kise? Dhan furalo pan furalo kha-jna debo kee? Ar kəțadin səbur kərə rasun bunechhi.	Kids slept, locality silent, looters (bargis) came, Birds (Bulbul) have eaten the paddy, how can I pay the tax? The rice and betel leaf are finished, what would I pay as tax? Kindly wait a few days, I have sown garlic.

Literal Bengali script	Romanization of Bengali script	Literal meaning in English
আয় আয় চাঁদ মামা টিপ দিয়ে যা চাঁদের কপালে চাঁদ টিপ দিয়ে যা। ধান ভানলে কুঁড়ো দেব, মাছ কাটলে মুড়ো দেব কাল গাইয়ের দুধ দেব, দুধ খাবার বাটি দেব চাঁদের কপালে চাঁদ টিপ দিয়ে যা।।	Ay ay chad mama țip diye za, Chader kopale chad țip diye za. Dhan vangle kuru debɔ, Machh katle muru debo, Kalo gorur dudh debɔ, Dudh khabar bati debɔ. Chader kopale chad tip diye za.	Come uncle moon! Give a tip (Tip/Bindi, kohl mark to protect from evil eye); Give a tip on the moon's [baby's] forehead, O moon! When I husk the paddy I shall give you the chaff, When I cut a fish I shall give you the head, I shall give you the milk of a black cow, I shall give you a pot for drinking the milk, Give a tip on the moon's fore-head, O moon!

== See also ==
- Dobhashi
- Banglish
- Hinglish
- Roman Urdu
- Romanization of Arabic
- Devanagari transliteration
- Maltese language – a romanised language form of Classical Arabic language
- Fiji Hindi – a romanised language form of Hindi language
