= SLP1 =

ASCII transliteration scheme for the Sanskrit language from and to the Devanagari script

The Sanskrit Library Phonetic basic encoding scheme (SLP1) is an ASCII transliteration scheme for the Sanskrit language from and to the Devanagari script.

Differently from other transliteration schemes for Sanskrit, it can represent not only the basic Devanagari letters, but also phonetic segments, phonetic features and punctuation. SLP1 also describes how to encode classical and Vedic Sanskrit.

One of the main advantages of SLP1 is that each Devanagari letter used in Sanskrit maps to exactly one ASCII character, making it possible to create simple conversions between ASCII and Sanskrit. For example, the Harvard-Kyoto transliteration uses the single character "D" to represent "ड" and the combination "Dh" to represent "ढ". SLP1, in contrast, always uses a single character: "q" for "ड" and "Q" for "ढ". Such intermediate mappings, while convenient for the design of transliteration conversion functions, tend to hinder readability until they are re-converted to either Devanagari or the widely used IAST romanization scheme.

The tables in the following sections are taken from Peter Scharf's May 2008 talk.

== History ==
SLP1 was formally introduced in the book Linguistic Issues in Encoding Sanskrit by Peter M. Scharf and Malcolm D. Hyman as part of the Sanskrit Library project.

== Vowels ==
अ	आ	इ	ई	उ	ऊ	ए	ऐ	ओ	औ
a	A	i	I	u	U	e	E	o	O

The numeral "3" is suffixed to denote a prolonged vowel (pluta svara). For example, ओ३म् = o3m. Similarly, the numeral "1" is suffixed to denote a short "e" and "o", as in Dravidian: ऎ = e1, ऒ = o1. "1" and "3" are also used after a short and long agitated kampa respectively. Avagraha (ऽ) is represented by a single quote (').

== Sonorants ==
ऋ	ॠ	ऌ	ॡ
f	F	x	X

== Anusvāra/Visarga ==
अं	अः
M	H

Anunasika is represented by a tilde. For example, माँ = mA~. Jihvamuliya and upadhmaniya are encoded as "Z" and "V" respectively.

== Consonants ==
क	ख	ग	घ	ङ	Velar
k	K	g	G	N	Velar
च	छ	ज	झ	ञ	Palatal
c	C	j	J	Y	Palatal
ट	ठ	ड	ढ	ण	Retroflex
w	W	q	Q	R	Retroflex
त	थ	द	ध	न	Dental
t	T	d	D	n	Dental
प	फ	ब	भ	म	Labial
p	P	b	B	m	Labial
य	र	ल	व		Semi-vowel
y	r	l	v		Semi-vowel
श	ष	स	ह	ळ	Fricative
S	z	s	h	L	Fricative

== Vedic accents ==
Udatta, anudatta and svarita are encoded as "/", "\" and "^" respectively.

== See also ==
- Harvard-Kyoto
- ITRANS
- ISO 15919
- Devanagari transliteration
