= Character map =

A Character map utility allows a user to view and enter characters without having a relevant keyboard layout. Implementations include:

- Character Map (Windows), component of Microsoft Windows for viewing and copying characters
- GNOME Character Map, utility of GNOME for viewing and entering characters
- Haiku CharacterMap, component of the Haiku Operating System for viewing and entering characters
