= Harvard-Kyoto =

ASCII transliteration for Indic scripts

The Harvard-Kyoto Convention (Note: Harvard-Kyoto system source-Dominik Wujastyk (25 June 1996). "Transliteration of Devanāgarī".) is a system for transliterating Sanskrit and other languages that use the Devanāgarī script into ASCII. (Note: Shirley, R. (August 2007), Internet Security Glossary, Version 2, RFC 4949, archived from the original on June 13, 2016, retrieved June 13, 2016) It is predominantly used informally in e-mail, and for electronic texts.

== Harvard-Kyoto system ==
Prior to the Unicode era, the following Harvard-Kyoto scheme was developed for putting a fairly large amount of Sanskrit textual material into machine readable format without the use of diacritics as used in IAST. Instead of diacritics it uses upper case letters. Since it employs both upper and lower case letters in its scheme, proper nouns' first letter capitalization format cannot be followed. Because it is without diacritics, it enables one to input texts with a minimum motion of the fingers on the keyboard. For the consonants, the differences to learn are: compared to IAST, all letters with an underdot are typed as the same letter capitalized; guttural and palatal nasals (ṅ, ñ) as the corresponding upper case voiced plosives (G, J); IAST ḷ, ḻ, ḻh are quite rare; the only transliteration that needs to be remembered is z for ś. The vowels table, the significant difference is for the sonorants and Anusvāra, visarga are capitalized instead of their diacritics. Finally, it is fairly readable with practice.

== Vowels ==
अ	आ	इ	ई	उ	ऊ	ए	ऐ	ओ	औ
a	A	i	I	u	U	e	ai	o	au

== Sonorants ==
ऋ	ॠ	ऌ	ॡ
R	RR	lR	lRR

== Anusvāra and visarga ==
anusvara	visarga
अं	अः
aM	aH

== Consonants ==
क	ख	ग	घ	ङ	Velar
k	kh	g	gh	G	
च	छ	ज	झ	ञ	Palatal
c	ch	j	jh	J	
ट	ठ	ड	ढ	ण	Retroflex
T	Th	D	Dh	N	
त	थ	द	ध	न	Dental
t	th	d	dh	n	
प	फ	ब	भ	म	Labial
p	ph	b	bh	m	
य	र	ल	व		Semi-vowel
y	r	l	v		
श	ष	स	ह	ळ	Fricative
z	S	s	h	L	

== Conversion to Devanagari ==
Sanskrit text encoded in the Harvard-Kyoto convention can be unambiguously converted to Devanāgarī, with two exceptions: Harvard-Kyoto does not distinguish अइ (a followed by i, in separate syllables, i.e. in hiatus) from ऐ (the diphthong ai) or अउ (a followed by u) from औ (the diphthong au). However such a vowel hiatus would occur extremely rarely inside words. Such a hiatus most often occurs in sandhi between two words (e.g. a sandhi of a word ending in 'aH' and one beginning with 'i' or 'u'). Since in such a situation a text transliterated in Harvard-Kyoto would introduce a space between the 'a' and 'i' (or 'a' and 'u') no ambiguity would result.

== Harvard-Kyoto method for modern Russian language ==
This method allows not only determining the correct pronunciation of Russian words but also maintains the Russian orthography, since a single Harvard-Kyoto letter corresponds to each Russian one. There is no need for diacritical signs and potential digraph confusion is prevented. All symbols are available on standard keyboards.

RU	H-K	Digraph	Explanation
а	a		
б	b		
в	v		
г	g		
д	d		
е	e	(ye)	* automatically palatalizes previous consonant: at the beginning or after a vowel, automatically iotated
ё	O	eo	* iotated ⟨o⟩: automatically palatalizes previous consonant; at the beginning or after vowel, automatically iotated
ж	Z	zh	* romanized Slavic ⟨ž⟩: as in English "measure" or French "bourgeon"
з	z		
и	i		automatically palatalizes previous consonant
й	Y		iot does not produce a syllable, is treated as a consonant
к	k		
л	l		
м	m		
н	n		
о	o		
п	p		
р	r		
с	s		
т	t		
у	u		
ф	f		
х	h	kh	thick as Spanish "México", not an aspiration
ц	c	ts	* as in Italian "pizza": traditionally Latin letter ⟨c⟩, in Russian called "це" (tse)
ч	C	ch	
ш	S	sh	
щ	T	tsh	palatalized form of English ⟨sh⟩
ъ	J	-	* does not produce a sound: virtually disjuncts word, therefore forces the next vowel to be iotated; full analogy of Sanskrit sign ⟨ ् ⟩
ы	I	ue	* wide, open ⟨i⟩ or ⟨u⟩, often used in Eastern European languages: IPA phoneme ⟨ɨ⟩
ь	j	-	* does not produce sound: palatalizes previous consonant; next vowel iotated (if present)
э	E	ae	wide, open ⟨e⟩
ю	U	yu	* iotated ⟨u⟩, similar to German ⟨ü⟩: automatically palatalizes previous consonant; at the beginning or after a vowel, is automatically iotated
я	A	ya	* iotated ⟨a⟩, similar to German ⟨ä⟩: automatically palatalizes previous consonant; at the beginning or after a vowel, is automatically iotated

The Harvard-Kyoto system doesn't preserve upper-case letters, which is not an issue when only considering pronunciation. But the symbol "^", if desired, may give the hint that next letter is capitalized (^b = Б). As well, an apostrophe sign may be used to introduce a "stress" sign if necessary (za'mok – castle; zamo'k – lock).

== See also ==
- Devanagari transliteration
  - International Alphabet of Sanskrit Transliteration (IAST)
  - ISO 15919
  - ITRANS
  - National Library at Kolkata romanization
  - SLP1
  - Velthuis
  - WX notation
