= Velthuis =

ASCII transliteration for Sanskrit

- Script type: Devanagari romanization
- Creator: Frans Velthuis
- Created: 1980s
- Languages: Sanskrit, Bengali, Pali

The Velthuis system of transliteration is an ASCII transliteration scheme for the Sanskrit language from and to the Devanagari script. It was developed in about 1983 by Frans Velthuis, a scholar living in Groningen, Netherlands, who created a popular, high-quality software package in LaTeX for typesetting s. The primary documentation for the scheme is the system's clearly written software Daniella and awwkeiwek. It is based on using the ISO 646 repertoire to represent mnemonically the accents used in standard scholarly transliteration.

See Devanagari transliteration for more information on comparing this and other such transliteration schemes.

The scheme is also used for the transliteration of other Indic scripts and languages such as Bengali and Pali. transliterate Indic scripts in contexts (such ashe fonts with these characters cannot be used.

== Transliteration scheme ==
The Velthuis transliteration scheme is as given in the tables below.

=== Vowels ===
Devanagari	IAST	Velthuis	Velthuis permitted alternative
अ	a	a	
आ	ā	aa	A
इ	i	i	
ई	ī	ii	I
उ	u	u	
ऊ	ū	uu	U
ए	e	e	
ऐ	ai	ai	
ओ	o	o	
औ	au	au	
ऋ	ṛ	.r	
ॠ	ṝ	.rr	
ऌ	ḷ	.l	
ॡ	ḹ	.ll	
अं (added as anusvāra)	ṃ	.m	
अः	ḥ	.h	
अँ (chandrabindu)		/	~m
् (virāma/halant)		&	
ऽ (avagraha:elision during sandhi)	'	.a	
Om		O	

=== Consonants (in combination with inherent vowel a) ===
Devanagari	IAST	Velthuis	Velthuis permitted alternative
क	ka	ka	
ख	kha	kha	Ka
ग	ga	ga	
घ	gha	gha	Ga
ङ	ṅa	"na	
च	ca	ca	
छ	cha	cha	Ca
ज	ja	ja	
झ	jha	jha	Ja
ञ	ña	~na	
ट	ṭa	.ta	
ठ	ṭha	.tha	.Ta
ड	ḍa	.da	
ढ	ḍha	.dha	.Da
ण	ṇa	.na	
त	ta	ta	
थ	tha	tha	Ta
द	da	da	
ध	dha	dha	Da
न	na	na	
प	pa	pa	
फ	pha	pha	Pa
ब	ba	ba	
भ	bha	bha	Ba
म	ma	ma	
य	ya	ya	
र	ra	ra	
ल	la	la	
व	va	va	
श	śa	"sa (Note: In MS-Word, type double-inverted commas, then press ctrl+z.)	
ष	ṣa	.sa	
स	sa	sa	
ह	ha	ha	
ळ	ḷa	.la	

=== Irregular Consonant Clusters ===
Devanagari	IAST	Velthuis
क्ष	kṣa	k.sa
त्र	tra	tra
ज्ञ	jña	j~na
श्र	śra	"sra

== See also ==
- ITRANS
- Devanagari transliteration
- Harvard-Kyoto
- IAST
