= Devanagari transliteration =

Transliteration from Devanagari to the Latin script

Devanagari transliteration is the process of representing text written in Devanagari script—an Indic script used for Classical Sanskrit and many other Indic languages—in the Latin script, preserving pronunciation and spelling conventions. There are several methods of transliteration from Devanagari to the Latin script (i.e., romanisation), including the IAST notation. Romanised Devanagari is also called Romanagari.

== IAST ==
The International Alphabet of Sanskrit Transliteration (IAST) is a subset of the ISO 15919 standard, used for the transliteration of Sanskrit, Prakrit and Pāḷi into Roman script with diacritics. IAST is a widely used standard. It uses diacritics to disambiguate phonetically similar but not identical Sanskrit glyphs. For example, dental and retroflex consonants are disambiguated with an underdot: dental द=d and retroflex ड=ḍ. An important feature of IAST is that it is losslessly reversible, i.e., IAST transliteration may be converted back to correct Devanāgarī or to some other South Asian scripts without ambiguity (except for scripts used for Dravidian languages, which require distinguishing long and short mid vowels). Many Unicode fonts fully support IAST display and printing.

Although the Roman script has long been the basis of standard systems of transliteration of Indian languages, and has been advocated for general use on various grounds by linguists such as J R Firth and S. K. Chatterji, it has been seriously employed only for one language—Konkani.

== Hunterian system ==
The Hunterian system is the "national system of romanisation in India" and the one officially adopted by the Government of India.

The Hunterian system was developed in the nineteenth century by William Wilson Hunter, then Surveyor General of India. When it was proposed, it immediately met with opposition from supporters of the earlier practiced non-systematic and often distorting "Sir Roger Dowler method" (an early corruption of Siraj ud-Daulah) of phonetic transcription, which climaxed in a dramatic showdown in an India Council meeting on 28 May 1872 where the new Hunterian method carried the day. The Hunterian method was inherently simpler and extensible to several Indic scripts because it systematised grapheme transliteration, and it came to prevail and gain government and academic acceptance. Opponents of the grapheme transliteration model continued to mount unsuccessful attempts at reversing government policy until the turn of the century, with one critic calling appealing to "the Indian Government to give up the whole attempt at scientific (i.e. Hunterian) transliteration, and decide once and for all in favour of a return to the old phonetic spelling."

Over time, the Hunterian method extended in reach to cover several Indic scripts, including Burmese and Tibetan. Provisions for schwa deletion in Indo-Aryan languages were also made where applicable, e.g. the Hindi कानपुर is transliterated as kānpur (and not kānapura) but the Sanskrit क्रम is transliterated as krama (and not kram). The system has undergone some evolution over time. For instance, long vowels were marked with an accent diacritic in the original version, but this was later replaced in the 1954 Government of India update with a macron. Thus, जान (life) was previously romanised as ján but began to be romanised as jān. The Hunterian system has faced criticism over the years for not producing phonetically accurate results and being "unashamedly geared towards an English-language receiver audience." Specifically, the lack of differentiation between retroflex and dental consonants (e.g. द and ड are both represented by d) has come in for repeated criticism and inspired several proposed modifications of Hunterian, including using a diacritic below retroflexes (e.g. making द=d and ड=ḍ, which is more readable but requires diacritic printing) or capitalising them (e.g. making द=d and ड=D, which requires no diacritic printing but is less readable because it mixes small and capital letters in words).

== Alternative transliteration methods ==
=== Schemes with diacritics ===
==== National Library at Kolkata romanisation ====
The National Library at Kolkata romanisation, intended for the romanisation of all Indic scripts, is an extension of IAST. It differs from IAST in the use of the symbols ē and ō for ए and ओ (e and o are used for the short vowels present in many Indian languages), the use of 'ḷ' for the consonant (in Kannada) ಳ, and the absence of symbols for ॠ, ऌ and ॡ.

==== ISO 15919 ====
A standard transliteration convention not just for Devanagari, but for all South-Asian languages was codified in the ISO 15919 standard of 2001, providing the basis for modern digital libraries that conform to International Organization for Standardization (ISO) norms. ISO 15919 defines the common Unicode basis for Roman transliteration of South-Asian texts in a wide variety of languages/scripts.

ISO 15919 transliterations are platform-independent texts so that they can be used identically on all modern operating systems and software packages, as long as they comply with ISO norms. This is a prerequisite for all modern platforms so that ISO 15919 has become the new standard for digital libraries and archives for transliterating all South Asian texts.

ISO 15919 uses diacritics to map the much larger set of Brahmic graphemes to the Latin script. The Devanagari-specific portion is nearly identical to the academic standard, IAST: "International Alphabet of Sanskrit Transliteration", and to ALA-LC, the United States Library of Congress standard.

Another standard, United Nations Romanization Systems for Geographical Names (UNRSGN), was developed by the United Nations Group of Experts on Geographical Names (UNGEGN) and covers many Brahmic scripts. There are some differences between ISO 15919 and UNRSGN.

=== ASCII schemes ===
==== Harvard-Kyoto ====
Compared to IAST, Harvard-Kyoto looks much simpler. It does not contain any of the diacritic marks that IAST contains. Instead of diacritics, Harvard-Kyoto uses capital letters. The use of capital letters makes typing in Harvard-Kyoto much easier than in IAST but produces words with capital letters inside them.

==== ITRANS scheme ====
ITRANS is an extension of Harvard-Kyoto. The ITRANS transliteration scheme was developed for the ITRANS software package, a pre-processor for Indic scripts. The user inputs in Roman letters and the ITRANS preprocessor converts the Roman letters into Devanāgarī (or other Indic scripts). The latest version of ITRANS is version 5.30 released in July 2001.

==== Velthuis ====
The disadvantage of the above ASCII schemes is case-sensitivity, implying that transliterated names may not be capitalised. This difficulty is avoided with the system developed in 1996 by Frans Velthuis for TeX, loosely based on IAST, in which case is irrelevant.

==== WX ====
WX notation is a transliteration scheme for representing Indian languages in ASCII. This scheme originated at IIT Kanpur for computational processing of Indian languages, and is widely used among the natural language processing (NLP) community in India. The notation (though unidentified) is used, for example, in a textbook on NLP from IIT Kanpur.[1] The salient features of this transliteration scheme are: Every consonant and every vowel has a single mapping into Roman. Hence it is a prefix code,[2] advantageous from a computation point of view. Typically the small case letters are used for un-aspirated consonants and short vowels while the capital case letters are used for aspirated consonants and long vowels. While the retroflexed voiceless and voiced consonants are mapped to 't, T, d and D', the dentals are mapped to 'w, W, x and X'. Hence the name of the scheme "WX", referring to the idiosyncratic mapping. Ubuntu Linux provides a keyboard support for WX notation.

==== SLP1 ====
SLP1 (Sanskrit Library Phonetic) is a case-sensitive scheme initially used by Sanskrit Library which was developed by Peter Scharf and (the late) Malcolm Hyman, who first described it in appendix B of their book Linguistic Issues in Encoding Sanskrit. The advantage of SLP1 over other encodings is that a single ASCII character is used for each Devanagari letter, a peculiarity that eases reverse transliteration.

==== Hinglish ====
Hinglish refers to the non-standardised Romanised Hindi used online, and especially on social media. In India, Romanised Hindi is the dominant form of expression online. In an analysis of YouTube comments, Palakodety et al., identified that 52% of comments were in Romanised Hindi, 46% in English, and 1% in Devanagari Hindi.

==== Others ====
Other less popular ASCII schemes include WX notation, Vedatype and the 7-bit ISO 15919. WX notation is a transliteration scheme for representing Indian languages in ASCII. It originated at IIT Kanpur for computational processing of Indian languages and is widely used among the natural language processing (NLP) community in India. This scheme is described in NLP Panini (Appendix B). It is similar to, but not as versatile as, SLP1, as far as the coverage of Vedic Sanskrit is concerned. Comparison of WX with other schemes is found in Huet (2009), App A.. Vedatype is another scheme used for encoding Vedic texts at Maharishi University of Management. An online transcoding utility across all these schemes is provided at the Sanskrit Library. ISO 15919 includes a so-called "limited character set" option to replace the diacritics by prefixes, so that it is ASCII-compatible. A pictorial explanation is here from Anthony Stone.

== Transliteration comparison ==
The following is a comparison of the major transliteration methods used for Devanāgarī.

=== Vowels ===
Devanāgarī	IAST	ISO 15919	Monier-Williams72	Harvard-Kyoto	ITRANS	Velthuis	SLP1	WX	Hunterian
अ	a	a	a	a	a	a	a	a	a
आ	ā	ā	ā	A	A/aa	aa	A	A	a
इ	i	i	i	i	i	i	i	i	i
ई	ī	ī	ī	I	I/ii	ii	I	I	i
उ	u	u	u	u	u	u	u	u	u
ऊ	ū	ū	ū	U	U/uu	uu	U	U	u
ए	e	ē	e	e	e	e	e	e	e
ऐ	ai	ai	ai	ai	ai	ai	E	E	ai
ओ	o	ō	o	o	o	o	o	o	o
औ	au	au	au	au	au	au	O	O	au
ऋ	ṛ	r̥	ṛi	R	RRi/R^i	.r	f	q	ri
ॠ	ṝ	r̥̄	ṛī	RR	RRI/R^I	.rr	F	Q	ri
ऌ	ḷ	l̥	lṛi	lR	LLi/L^i	.l	x	L	
ॡ	ḹ	l̥̄	lṛī	lRR	LLI/L^I	.ll	X	LY	
अं	ṃ	ṁ	ṉ/ṃ	M	M/.n/.m	.m	M	M	n, m
अः	ḥ	ḥ	ḥ	h	H	H	.h	H	H
अँ	m̐	m̐			.N		~	az	
ऽ	'	’		'	.a	.a	'	Z	

=== Consonants ===
The Devanāgarī standalone consonant letters are followed by an implicit schwa (/ə/). In all of the transliteration systems, that /ə/ must be represented explicitly using an 'a' or any equivalent of schwa.

Devanāgarī	IAST	ISO 15919	Monier-Williams72	Harvard-Kyoto	ITRANS	Velthuis	SLP1	WX	Hunterian
क	ka	ka	ka	ka	ka	ka	ka	ka	k
ख	kha	kha	kha	kha	kha	kha	Ka	Ka	kh
ग	ga	ga	ga	ga	ga	ga	ga	ga	g
घ	gha	gha	gha	gha	gha	gha	Ga	Ga	gh
ङ	ṅa	ṅa	n·a	Ga	~Na	"na	Na	fa	n
च	ca	ca	ća	ca	cha	ca	ca	ca	ch
छ	cha	cha	ćha	cha	Cha	chha	Ca	Ca	chh
ज	ja	ja	ja	ja	ja	ja	ja	ja	j
झ	jha	jha	jha	jha	jha	jha	Ja	Ja	jh
ञ	ña	ña	ṅa	Ja	~na	~na	Ya	Fa	n
ट	ṭa	ṭa	ṭa	Ta	Ta	.ta	wa	ta	t
ठ	ṭha	ṭha	ṭha	Tha	Tha	.tha	Wa	Ta	th
ड	ḍa	ḍa	ḍa	Da	Da	.da	qa	da	d
ढ	ḍha	ḍha	ḍha	Dha	Dha	.dha	Qa	Da	dh
ण	ṇa	ṇa	ṇa	Na	Na	.na	Ra	Na	n
त	ta	ta	ta	ta	ta	ta	ta	wa	t
थ	tha	tha	tha	tha	tha	tha	Ta	Wa	th
द	da	da	da	da	da	da	da	xa	d
ध	dha	dha	dha	dha	dha	dha	Da	Xa	dh
न	na	na	na	na	na	na	na	na	n
प	pa	pa	pa	pa	pa	pa	pa	pa	p
फ	pha	pha	pha	pha	pha	pha	Pa	Pa	ph
ब	ba	ba	ba	ba	ba	ba	ba	ba	b
भ	bha	bha	bha	bha	bha	bha	Ba	Ba	bh
म	ma	ma	ma	ma	ma	ma	ma	ma	m
य	ya	ya	ya	ya	ya	ya	ya	ya	y
र	ra	ra	ra	ra	ra	ra	ra	ra	r
ल	la	la	la	la	la	la	la	la	l
व	va	va	va	va	va/wa	va	va	va	v, w
श	śa	śa	ṡa	za	sha	"sa	Sa	Sa	sh
ष	ṣa	ṣa	sha	Sa	Sha	.sa	za	Ra	sh
स	sa	sa	sa	sa	sa	sa	sa	sa	s
ह	ha	ha	ha	ha	ha	ha	ha	ha	h
ळ	ḻa	ḷa		La	La	.la	La	lY	

=== Irregular consonant clusters ===
Devanāgarī	ISO 15919	Harvard-Kyoto	ITRANS	Velthuis	SLP1	WX	Hunterian
क्ष	kṣa	kSa	kSa/kSha/xa	k.sa	kza	kRa	ksh
त्र	tra	tra	tra	tra	tra	wra	tr
ज्ञ	jña	jJa	GYa/j~na	j~na	jYa	jFa	gy, jñ
श्र	śra	zra	shra	"sra	Sra	Sra	shr

=== Other consonants ===
Devanāgarī	ISO 15919	ITRANS	WX	Hunterian
क़	qa	qa	kZa	q
ख़	k͟ha	Ka	KZa	kh
ग़	ġa	Ga	gZa	gh
ज़	za	za	jZa	z
फ़	fa	fa	PZa	f
ड़	ṛa	.Da/Ra	dZa	r
ढ़	ṛha	.Dha/Rha	DZa	rh

=== Comparison of IAST with ISO 15919 ===
The table below shows just the differences between ISO 15919 and IAST for Devanagari transliteration.

Devanagari	ISO 15919	IAST	Comment
ए / े	ē	e	To distinguish between long and short 'e' in Dravidian languages, 'e' now represents ऎ / ॆ (short). Note that the use of ē is considered optional in ISO 15919, and using e for ए (long) is acceptable for languages that do not distinguish long and short e.
ओ / ो	ō	o	To distinguish between long and short 'o' in Dravidian languages, 'o' now represents ऒ / ॊ (short). Note that the use of ō is considered optional in ISO 15919, and using o for ओ (long) is acceptable for languages that do not distinguish long and short o.
ऋ / ृ	r̥	ṛ	In ISO 15919, ṛ is used to represent ड़.
ॠ / ॄ	r̥̄	ṝ	For consistency with r̥
ऌ / ॢ	l̥	ḷ	In ISO 15919, ḷ is used to represent ळ.
ॡ / ॣ	l̥̄	ḹ	For consistency with l̥
◌ं	ṁ	ṃ	ISO 15919 has two options about anusvāra. (1) In the simplified nasalisation option, an anusvāra is always transliterated as ṁ. (2) In the strict nasalization option, anusvāra before a class consonant is transliterated as the class nasal—ṅ before k, kh, g, gh, ṅ; ñ before c, ch, j, jh, ñ; ṇ before ṭ, ṭh, ḍ, ḍh, ṇ; n before t, th, d, dh, n; m before p, ph, b, bh, m. ṃ is sometimes used to specifically represent Gurmukhi Tippi ੰ.
◌ं	ṅ ñ ṇ n m	ṃ	ISO 15919 has two options about anusvāra. (1) In the simplified nasalisation option, an anusvāra is always transliterated as ṁ. (2) In the strict nasalization option, anusvāra before a class consonant is transliterated as the class nasal—ṅ before k, kh, g, gh, ṅ; ñ before c, ch, j, jh, ñ; ṇ before ṭ, ṭh, ḍ, ḍh, ṇ; n before t, th, d, dh, n; m before p, ph, b, bh, m. ṃ is sometimes used to specifically represent Gurmukhi Tippi ੰ.
◌ँ	m̐	m̐	Vowel nasalisation is transliterated as a tilde above the transliterated vowel (over the second vowel in the case of a digraph such as aĩ, aũ), except in Sanskrit.
ळ	ḻ	ḷ	Used in Vedic Sanskrit only and not found in the Classical variant

== Details ==
=== Treatment of inherent schwa ===
Devanāgarī consonants include an "inherent a" sound, called the schwa, that must be explicitly represented with an "a" character in the transliteration. Many words and names transliterated from Devanāgarī end with "a", to indicate the pronunciation in the original Sanskrit. This schwa is obligatorily deleted in several modern Indo-Aryan languages, like Hindi, Punjabi, Marathi and others. This results in differing transliterations for Sanskrit and schwa-deleting languages that retain or eliminate the schwa as appropriate:

- Sanskrit: Mahābhārata, Rāmāyaṇa, Śiva, Sāmaveda
- Hindi: Mahābhārat, Rāmāyaṇ, Śiv, Sāmved

Some words may keep the final a, generally because they would be difficult to say without it:

- Krishna, Vajra, Maurya

Because of this, some words ending in consonant clusters are altered in various modern Indic languages as such: Mantra=mantar. Shabda=shabad. Sushumna=sushumana.

=== Retroflex consonants ===
Most Indian languages make a distinction between the retroflex and dental forms of the dental consonants. In formal transliteration schemes, the standard Roman letters are used to indicate the dental form, and the retroflex form is indicated by special marks, or the use of other letters. E.g., in IAST transliteration, the retroflex forms are ṇ, ṭ, ḍ and ṣ.

In most informal transcriptions the distinction between retroflex and dental consonants is not indicated. However, many capitalise retroflex consonants on QWERTY keyboard in informal messaging. That generally obviates the need for transliteration.

=== Aspirated consonants ===
Where the letter "h" appears after a plosive consonant in Devanāgarī transliteration, it always indicates aspiration. Thus "ph" is pronounced as the p in "pit" (with a small puff of air released as it is said), never as the ph in "photo" (IPA /f/). (On the other hand, "p" is pronounced as the p in "spit" with no release of air.) Similarly "th" is an aspirated "t", neither the th of "this" (voiced, IPA /ð/) nor the th of "thin" (unvoiced, IPA /θ/).

The aspiration is generally indicated in both formal and informal transliteration systems.

== Computer use as a drive for romanisation ==
As English is widely used as a professional and higher-education language in India, availability of Devanagari keyboards is dwarfed by English keyboards. Similarly, software and user interfaces released and promoted in India are in English, as is much of the computer education available there. Due to low awareness of Devanagari keyboard layouts, many Indian users type Hindi in the Roman script.

Before Devanagari was added to Unicode, many workarounds were used to display Devanagari on the Internet, and many sites and services have continued using them despite widespread availability of Unicode fonts supporting Devanagari. Although there are several transliteration conventions on transliterating Hindi to Roman, most of these are reliant on diacritics. As most Indians are familiar with the Roman script through the English language (which traditionally does not use diacritics), these transliteration systems are much less widely known. Most such "Romanagari" is transliterated arbitrarily to imitate English spelling, and thus results in numerous inconsistencies.

It is also detrimental to search engines, which do not classify Hindi text in the Roman script as Hindi. The same text may also not be classified as English.

Regardless of the physical keyboard's layout, it is possible to install Unicode-based Hindi keyboard layouts on most modern operating systems. There are many online services available that transliterate text written in Roman to Devanagari accurately, using Hindi dictionaries for reference, such as Google transliteration or Microsoft Indic Language Input Tool. This solution is similar to input method editors, which are traditionally used to input text in languages that use complex characters, most notably those that use logographies.

== History of Sanskrit transliteration ==
During the second and first millennia BCE, Sanskrit texts were transmitted by memorisation and repetition. Post-Harappan India had no system for writing Indic languages until the creation (in the 4th-3rd centuries BCE) of the Kharoshti and Brahmi scripts. These writing systems, though adequate for Middle Indic languages, including the Aśokan inscriptions, were not well-adapted to writing Sanskrit. However, later descendants of Brahmi were modified so that they could record Sanskrit in exacting phonetic detail. The earliest physical text in Sanskrit is a rock inscription by the Western Kshatrapa ruler Rudradaman, written c. 150 CE in Junagadh, Gujarat. Due to the remarkable proliferation of different varieties of Brahmi in the Middle Ages, there is today no single script used for writing Sanskrit; rather, Sanskrit scholars can write the language in a form of whatever script is used to write their local language. However, since the late Middle Ages, there has been a tendency to use Devanagari for writing Sanskrit texts for a widespread readership in North India.

Western scholars in the nineteenth century adopted Devanagari for printed editions of Sanskrit texts. The editio princeps of the Rigveda by Max Müller was in Devanagari. Müller's London typesetters competed with their Petersburg peers working on Böhtlingk's and Roth's dictionary in cutting all the required ligature types.

From its beginnings, Western Sanskrit philology also felt the need for a romanised spelling of the language. Franz Bopp in 1816 used a romanisation scheme, alongside Devanagari, differing from IAST in expressing vowel length by a circumflex (â, î, û), and aspiration by a spiritus asper (e.g. bʽ for IAST bh). The sibilants IAST ṣ and ś he expressed with spiritus asper and lenis, respectively (sʽ, sʼ). Monier-Williams in his 1899 dictionary used ć, ṡ and sh for IAST c, ś and ṣ, respectively.

From the late 19th century, Western interest in typesetting Devanagari decreased. Theodor Aufrecht published his 1877 edition of the Rigveda in romanised Sanskrit, and Arthur Macdonell's 1910 Vedic grammar (and 1916 Vedic grammar for students) likewise do without Devanagari (while his introductory Sanskrit grammar for students retains Devanagari alongside romanised Sanskrit). Contemporary Western editions of Sanskrit texts appear in both IAST and Devanagari, with the latter script gaining popularity due to the widespread adoption of Unicode and the international spread of writing technologies like LibreOffice and XeTeX that make writing and publishing Devanagari easy.

== See also ==
- The National Library at Kolkata romanisation and ISO 15919 are extensions of IAST to transcribe all Indic scripts
- ISCII, an 8-bit encoding for Indic scripts
- ITRANS, a transliteration scheme used in Phonetic Devanagari typing tools
- Velthuis, a transliteration scheme in ASCII
- Hunterian system, the government-approved standard for transliterating Standard Hindi in India
- Hinglish
- Roman Urdu
