= Hunterian transliteration =

Indian transliteration system

The Hunterian transliteration system is the "national system of romanization in India" and the one officially adopted by the Government of India. Hunterian transliteration was sometimes also called the Jonesian transliteration system because it derived closely from a previous transliteration method developed by William Jones (1746–1794). Upon its establishment, the Sahitya Akademi (India's National Academy of Letters) also adopted the Hunterian method, with additional adaptations, as its standard method of maintaining its bibliography of Indian-language works.

== History ==
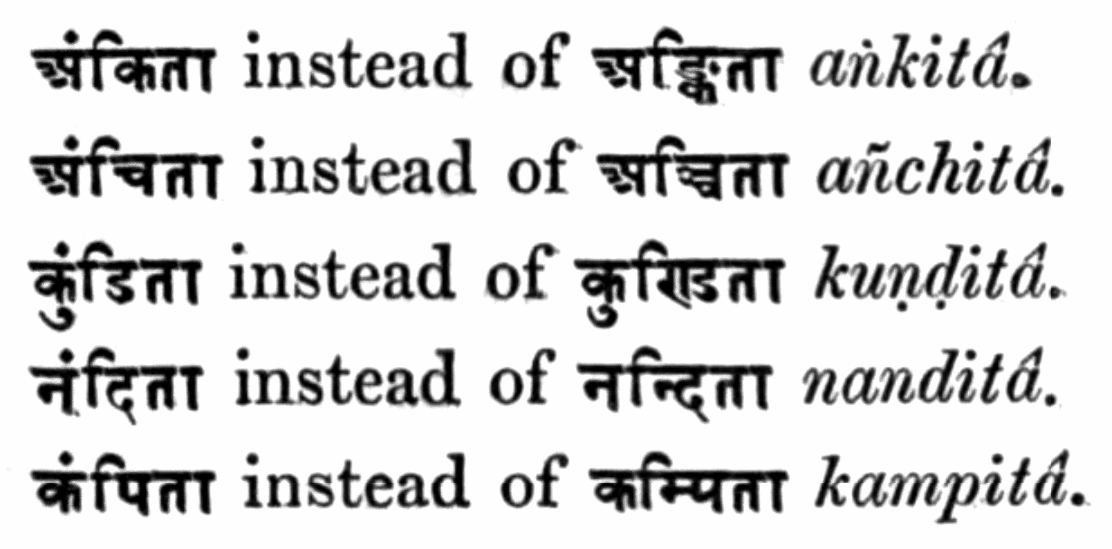
Max Muller's 1866 anusvara transliterations

The original precursor to the Hunterian system was a transliteration method developed by Charles Wilkins, who is sometimes called the "father of Devanagari typography" because he was also the creator of the first Devanagari typeface. William Jones, who also founded the Asiatic Society, further developed the transliteration method. It was given a more complete form in the late nineteenth century by William Wilson Hunter, then Surveyor General of India. When it was proposed, it immediately met with opposition from supporters of the phonetic Dowler system, which climaxed in a dramatic showdown in an India Council meeting on 28 May 1872 where the new Hunterian method carried the day. The Hunterian method was inherently simpler and extensible to several Indic scripts because it systematized grapheme transliteration, and it came to prevail and gain government and academic acceptance. Opponents of the grapheme transliteration model continued to mount unsuccessful attempts at reversing government policy until the turn of the century, with one critic calling appealing to "the Indian Government to give up the whole attempt at scientific (i.e. Hunterian) transliteration, and decide once and for all in favour of a return to the old phonetic spelling."

== Additional languages and adaptations ==
Over time, the Hunterian method extended in reach to cover several Indic scripts, including Burmese and Tibetan. The Hunterian system was used to establish writing systems that used the Latin alphabet for some Indian languages that were previously not associated with a written script, such as Mizo. In the case of Mizo, the Hunterian-based writing system "has proved hugely successful." Provisions for schwa deletion in Indo-Aryan languages were also made where applicable, e.g. the Hindi कानपुर is transliterated as kānpur (and not kānapura) but the Sanskrit क्रम is transliterated as krama (and not kram). The system has undergone some evolution over time. For instance, long vowels were marked with an acute accent in the original version, but this was later replaced in the 1954 Government of India update with a macron. Thus, जान ('life') was previously romanized as ján but began to be romanized as jān. Additional diacritics have been proposed for various purposes, such as disambiguating Urdu letters which map to a single Devanagari grapheme (e.g. ث ,س and ص which all map to स). Some languages of the region are tonal, such as Mizo and Punjabi, and accent marks over vowels have been repurposed to indicate tone for some of them.

== Vowels ==
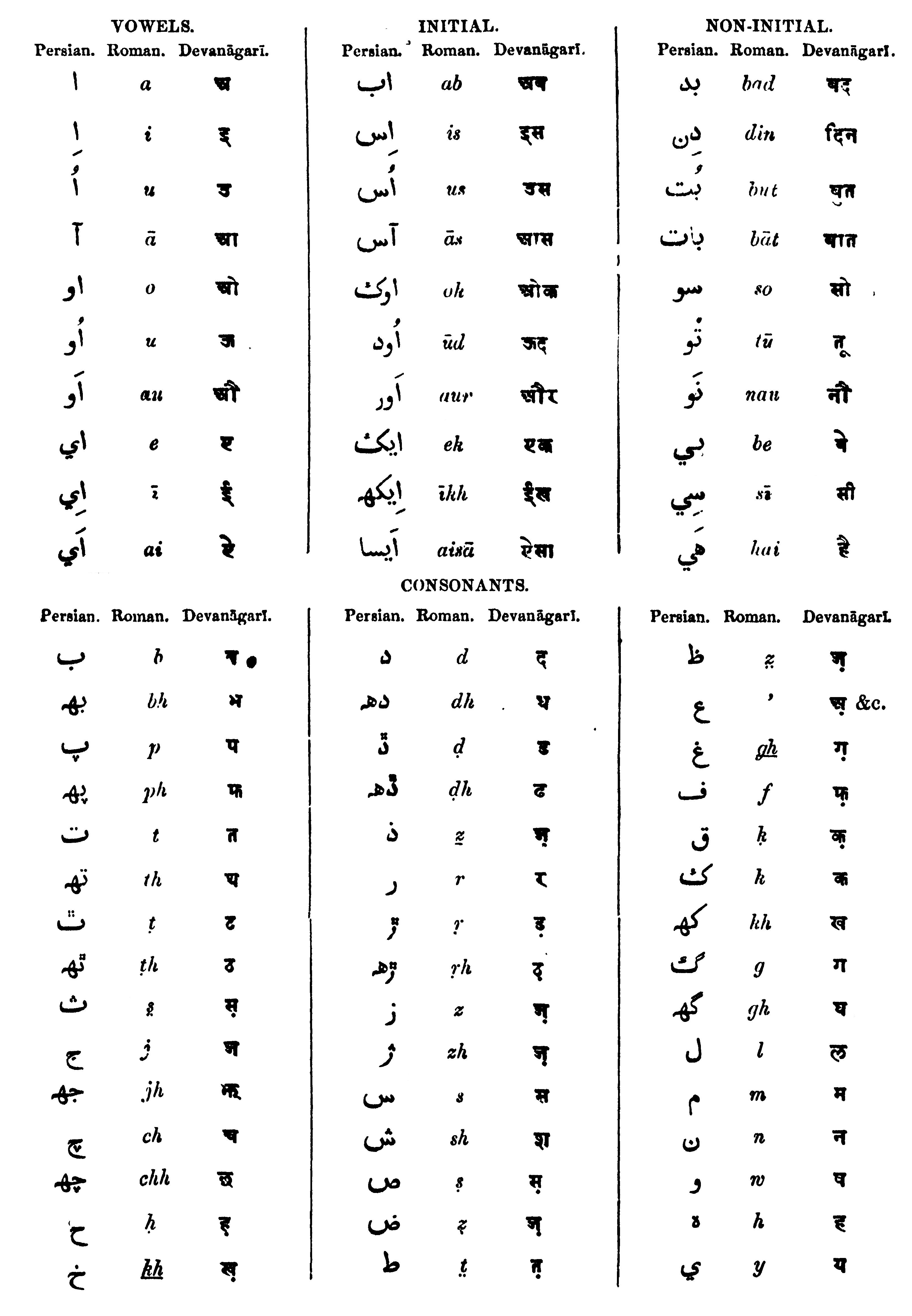
An 1848 adaptation of the Jonesian/Hunterian system with both Devanagari and Perso-Arabic characters

Main Hindustani vowels with their various representations:

Devanagari	Urdu (Note: This will only display in the Nastaliq script if you have a suitable Urdu font installed. If this نستعلیق and this نستعلیق looks like any of نستعلیق or نستعلیق, then you are probably seeing it written in the Naskh script.)	IPA	Hunterian	Proposed diacritic forms	Notes
अ	ا	[ə]	a	a	
आ	آ	aː	a	ā	
इ	اِ	ɪ	i	i	
ई	ی	iː	i	ī	
उ	اُ	ʊ	u	u	
ऊ	او	uː	u	ū	
ऋ	رِ	ɾɪ, ɻ̍	ri	ṛĭ	
ॠ	رِ	ɾiː, ɻ̍ː	ri	ṟĭ	
ए	اے	eː	e	ē	
ऐ	اے	ɛː, ai, æ	ai	ai	Rarely [æ] in Standard Hindi, but diphthongal pronunciation [ai] (like the 'i' in bike) in Bihari/Eastern Hindi
ओ	او	oː	o	ō	
औ	او	ɔː, au	au	au	Pronounced as the diphthong [au] (like 'ou' in house) in Bihari/Eastern Hindi
अं	ں, ن, م	ŋ, m	n, m	ṅ, ṁ	Differentiation between dental and labial anusvara
अः	ح	h	h	ḥ	
ऍ	اے	æ			No Hunterian symbol defined; almost never written phonetically in Hindi except for loanwords; more rigorous usage in Nepali
ऑ	او	ɒ			No Hunterian symbol defined; sound occurs in words like गौना ([gɒnaː]; 'engagement'), but never written phonetically except for loanwords

== Consonants ==
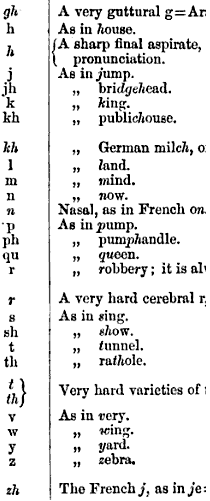
An 1879 Hunterian adaptation that uses italics

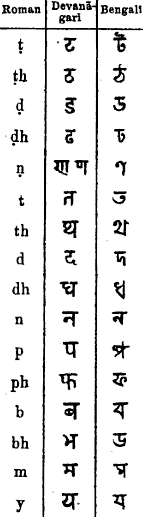
An 1895 Hunterian adaptation that uses diacritics

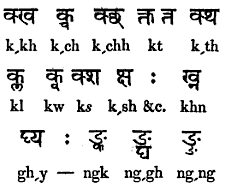
Many devices have been used to represent halants including small slashes

In the Hunterian system, implicit schwas are denoted by the transliterated schwa vowel in Devanagari, a (अ), and excluded as necessary under schwa deletion rules. Aspirations are represented by h. Retroflex graphemes are often represented by a diacritic dot under the Latin consonant that represents the equivalent dental graphemes in proposals (some of which predate even the Hunterian method), though this has not officially been accepted by the Indian government. Halants are indicated by either leaving out a vowel after the transliterated consonant or, in new proposals (not formally approved by the Indian government), with a period after the applicable consonant (e.g. जल्दी – jal.di). Initially, italics were sometimes used to differentiate consonants such as ख ("kh") and ख़ ("kh"), but later macrons and diacritics began to be used more extensively.

Devanagari	Urdu	IPA	Hunterian	Proposed diacritic forms	Notes
क	ک	k	k	k	
ख	کھ	kʰ	kh	kh	
ग	گ	g	g	g	
घ	گھ	ɡʱ	gh	gh	
ङ	ن	ŋ	n	ṅ	
च	چ	tʃ	ch	ch	
छ	چھ	tʃʰ	chh	cẖ, čh	
ज	ج	dʒ	j	j	
झ	جھ	dʒʱ	jh	jh	
ञ	ن	ɲ	n	ñ	
ट	ٹ	ʈ	t	ṭ	
ठ	ٹھ	ʈʰ	th	ṭh	
ड	ڈ	ɖ	d	ḍ	
ढ	ڈھ	ɖʱ	dh	ḍh	
ण	ن	ɳ	n	ṇ	
त	ت	t̪	t	t	
थ	تھ	t̪ʰ	th	th	
द	د	d̪	d	d	
ध	دھ	d̪ʱ	dh	dh	
न	ن	n	n	n	
प	پ	p	p	p	
फ	پھ	pʰ	ph	ph	
ब	ب	b	b	b	
भ	بھ	bʱ	bh	bh	
म	م	m	m	m	
य	ی	j	y	y	
र	ر	r	r	r	
ल	ل	l	l	l	
व	و	v, ʋ, w	v, w	v	In Marathi, [w], except [v] before [i]; [v], [ʋ], [w] allophony in Hindi
श	ش	ʃ	sh	sh	In Nepali, [s] or [sh] can be used
ष	ش	ʃ, ʂ	sh	ṣh	Commonly pronounced [ʃ] in Hindi; [ʂ] in Sanskrit and in Hindi before retroflex consonants
स	س	s	s	s	
ह	ح	ɦ	h	h	
क़	ق	q	q	q	
ख़	خ	x	kh	ḳh, k͟h	
ग़	غ	ɣ	gh	g͟h	
ड़	ڑ	ɽ	r	ṛ	
ढ़	ڑھ	ɽʱ	rh	ṛh	
फ़	ف	f	f	f	
ज़	ز	z	z	z	
झ़	ژ	ʒ	zh	zh	
क्ष	کش	kʃ, kʂ	ksh	kṣh	
त्र	تر	t̪r	tr	tr	
ज्ञ	گیہ	gj, dʑɲ	gy, jn	gy, jñ	Commonly pronounced [gj] in Hindi and [dʑɲ] in Sanskrit and occasionally in Hindi. Transliterated as gy for Hindi and jn for Sanskrit.
श्र	شر	ʃr	shr	shr	

== Examples ==
=== First example ===
मैं अपने संबंधी से कारख़ाने में मिला और उसने मुझे चाय पिलाई। वह बारिश के कारण फ़सलों को हुए नुक़सान की वजह से चिंतित था। मैंने उसे अपनी ख़बर सुनाई। क्योंकि मुझे निकलना था, इसीलिए कुछ देर बाद मैंने क्षमा माँगी और वहाँ से रवाना हुआ।

With diacritics:

mãĩ apne sambandhī se kārk͟hāne mẽ milā aur usne mujhe chāy pilāī. vo bāriś ke kāraṇ faslõ ko hue nuqsān kī vajah se cintit thā. maĩne use apnī k͟habar sunāī. kyõki mujhe nikalnā thā, isilie kuchh der bād mãĩne kṣhamā māṅgī aur vahā̃ se ravānā huā.

Without diacritics:

main apne sambandhi se karkhane men mila aur usne mujhe chay pilayi. wo barish ke karan faslon ko hue nuqsan ki vajah se chintit tha. maine use apni khabar sunayi. kyonki mujhe nikalna tha, isilie kuchh der bad maine kshama mangi aur vahan se ravana hua.

Note: संबंधी can interchangeably be written in two different ways: संबंधी and सम्बन्धी. चिंतित can also be written as चिन्तित.

=== Second example ===
इस साल ग्रीष्मकालीन वर्षा ज़्यादा होने से अमरूद और बेर की क़िल्लत देखी गई। मज़े की बात यह है कि सेब और ख़ुबानी की क़ीमतें कम हैं क्योंकि उत्तराखंड में गोदाम भरें हैं.

With diacritics:

is sāl grīṣmkālīn varṣā zyādā hone se amrūd aur ber kī qillat dekhī gaī. maze kī bāt ye hai ki seb aur k͟hubānī kī qīmtẽ kam hãĩ kyõki uttarākhaṇḍ mẽ godām bharẽ haĩ.

Without diacritics:

is sal grishmkalin varsha zyada hone se amrud aur ber ki qillat dekhi gayi. maze ki bat ye hai ki seb aur khubani ki qimten kam hain kyonki uttarakhand men godam bharen hain.

Note: उत्तराखंड can interchangeably be written in two different ways: उत्तराखंड and उत्तराखण्ड.

== Criticism ==
The Hunterian system has faced criticism over the years for not producing phonetically accurate results and being "unashamedly geared towards an English-language receiver audience." Specifically, the lack of differentiation between retroflex and dental consonants (e.g. द and ड are both represented by d) has come in for repeated criticism and inspired several proposed modifications of Hunterian, including using a diacritic below retroflexes (e.g. making द=d and ड=ḍ, which is more readable but requires diacritic printing) or capitalizing them (e.g. making द=d and ड=D, which requires no diacritic printing but is less readable because it mixes small and capital letters in words).

== See also ==
- William Wilson Hunter
- Devanagari transliteration
- ISO 15919
- International Alphabet of Sanskrit Transliteration
- Mizo language writing system
