= Visarga =

Diacritical mark in Indic scripts

Example glyphs
- Bengali–Assamese: ঃ
- Tibetan: ః
- Thai: ะ
- Malayalam: ഃ
- Sinhala: ඃ
- Ashoka Brahmi: 𑀂
- Devanagari: ः

Properties
- Phonemic representation: /h/
- IAST transliteration: ḥ Ḥ
- ISCII code point: A3 (163)

In Sanskrit phonology, visarga (IPA: [ʋisɐrɡɐ(hɐ)]) is the name of the voiceless glottal fricative, written in Devanagari as ⟨ः⟩ /h/. It was also called, equivalently, visarjanīya by earlier grammarians. The word visarga (Sanskrit: विसर्ग) literally means "sending forth, discharge".

Visarga is an allophone of /r/ and /s/ in pausa (at the end of an utterance). Since /-s/ is a common inflectional suffix (of nominative singular, second person singular, etc.), visarga appears frequently in Sanskrit texts. In the traditional order of Sanskrit sounds, visarga and anusvāra appear between vowels and stop consonants.

The precise pronunciation of visarga in Vedic texts may vary between Śākhās. Some pronounce a slight echo of the preceding vowel after the aspiration: aḥ will be pronounced [ɐhᵄ], and iḥ will be pronounced [ihⁱ]. Visarga is not to be confused with colon.

Transliteration	Symbol
ISO 15919 / IAST	⟨ḥ⟩
Harvard-Kyoto	⟨H⟩

== Types ==
The visarga is commonly found in writing, resembling the punctuation mark of colon or as two tiny circles one above the other. This form is retained by most Indic scripts.

According to Sanskrit phonologists, the visarga has two optional allophones: the jihvāmūlīya (जिह्वामूलीय, the velar visarga) and the upadhmānīya (उपध्मानीय, the labial visarga). The former may be pronounced before ⟨क⟩ and ⟨ख⟩, while the latter may be pronounced before ⟨प⟩ and ⟨फ⟩. Generally, jihvāmūlīya and upadhmānīya are not rendered distinctively from the visarga, though the respective glyphs ⟨ᳵ⟩ and ⟨ᳶ⟩ have occasionally been used in Devanagari for that purpose; sometimes, the ardhavisarga ⟨ᳲ⟩ (अर्धविसर्ग, 'half-visarga') is used for both. Similar glyphs are found in Brahmi, Kannada, Tibetan, Sharada, and Lantsa. Examples:

- तव पितामहः कः or तव पितामहᳵ कः or तव पितामहᳲ कः
  tava pitāmahaẖ kaḥ? — 'who is your grandfather?'
- पक्षिणः खे उड्डयन्ते or पक्षिणᳵ खे उड्डयन्ते or पक्षिणᳲ खे उड्डयन्ते
  pakṣiṇaẖ khe uḍḍayante — 'birds fly in the sky'
- भोः पाहि or भोᳶ पाहि or भोᳲ पाहि
  bhoḫ pāhi — 'sir, save me'
- तपःफलम् or तपᳶफलम् or तपᳲफलम्
  tapaḫphalam — 'result of penances'

== Other Brahmic scripts ==
=== Bengali ===
In the Bengali script, the visarga is written as ঃ and is known as bisarga (বিসর্গ). In Bengali it represents a weak post-vocalic release rather than a clearly articulated /h/ sound. Although it originates from Sanskrit final r- and s-sounds, modern Bengali preserves it primarily as an orthographic element, with its phonetic value varying according to position and environment.

==== Phonetic behaviour ====
When occurring medially within a word, the bisarga no longer produces a distinct aspiration; instead it tends to reinforce or lengthen the following consonant. Examples include দুঃস্বপ্ন or নিঃশ্বাস, where the bisarga historically reflects Sanskrit ः, but in Bengali the release is replaced by consonant strengthening or an increased sibilant effect.

When occurring finally at the end of a word, the bisarga marks an etymological aspiration inherited from Sanskrit, but in contemporary Bengali it is realised only as a very faint breath or is silent. Forms such as তঃ or যঃ illustrate this weakened contrast. Overall, Bengali pronunciation treats the visarga not as an independent consonant but as a modifier whose audible effect ranges from minimal to null.

==== Visarga Sandhi ====
In sandhi environments, the bisarga undergoes several regular transformations that depend on the nature of the following sound. These changes reflect its Sanskritic origins and are largely systematic in Bengali spelling, even when their phonetic effect is weak.

Before vowels, the bisarga commonly yields র or produces an ও-glide, preserving the historical continuity of r-final forms (e.g. পুনরধিকার). Before sibilants and coronal or palatal stops, it assimilates to the following consonant as the appropriate sibilant—শ, ষ, or স—a process that accounts for forms such as নিঃচয় → নিশ্চয়.

When followed by voiced consonants or semivowels, r-jāt bisarga typically appears as র, while s-jāt bisarga may produce an ও-transition; thus অন্তঃগত surfaces as অন্তর্গত. If the following consonant is র, the bisarga disappears entirely and the preceding vowel lengthens, as seen in নীরস. After the vowels ই or উ and before velar or labial stops, the bisarga may appear as ষ, producing forms such as নিষ্কাম.

Some compounds retain the written bisarga without any phonological modification, as in মনঃক্ষুণ্ণ. In other cases, the bisarga may be lost without affecting adjacent sounds, as in অতএব from অতঃ + এব. As a whole, visarga sandhi in Bengali reflects historical Sanskritic patterns that are preserved orthographically even though their phonetic realisation is limited in modern speech.

=== Burmese ===
In the Burmese script, the visarga (variously called ရှေ့ကပေါက် shay ga pauk, ဝစ္စနစ်လုံးပေါက် wizza nalone pauk, or ရှေ့ဆီး shay zi and represented with two dots to the right of the letter as း), when joined to a letter, creates the high tone.

=== Japanese ===
The Visarga mark used by Motoori.

Motoori Norinaga invented a mark for visarga which he used in a book about Indian orthography.

=== Javanese ===
In the Javanese script, the visarga, known as the wignyan (ꦮꦶꦒ꧀ꦚꦤ꧀), is represented by two curls to the right of a syllable as ꦃ: the first curl is short and circular, and the second curl is long. It adds a /-h/ after a vowel.

=== Kannada ===
In the Kannada script, the visarga (which is called visarga) is represented with two small circles to the right of a letter ಃ. It adds an aḥ sound to the end of the letter.

This script also has separate symbols for ardhavisarga absent in most other scripts, jihvamuliya, ೱ, and upadhmaniya, ೲ.

=== Khmer ===
In the Khmer script, the visarga (known as the reăhmŭkh (រះមុខ; "shining face")) indicates an aspirated /ʰ/ sound added after a syllable. It is represented with two small circles at the right of a letter as ះ, and it should not be confused with the similar-looking yŭkôlpĭntŭ (យុគလពិន្ទុ; "pair of dots"), which indicates a short vowel followed by a glottal stop like their equivalent visarga marks in the Thai and Lao scripts.

=== Lao ===
In the Lao script, the visarga is represented with two small curled circles to the right of a letter as ◌ະ. As in the neighboring related Thai script, it indicates a glottal stop after the vowel.

=== Malayalam ===
In the Malayalam script, the visarga or visargam is represented with two small circles to the right of a letter (ഃ). It indicates an /h/ sound after a letter. The visarga is considered as a vowel in Malayalam, where its independent form is written as അഃ. Unlike other languages, the visarga in Malayalam need not necessarily occur at the end of a word. Examples of visargas in the middle of words include ദുഃഖം, മനഃപ്രയാസം, പുനഃസൃഷ്ടി.

=== Odia ===
In the Odia script, the Bisarga is represented with a vertical infinity sign to the right of a letter as ଃ. It indicates the post-vocalic voiceless glottal fricative aḥ [h] sound after the letter, Unlike other languages, the bisarga can appear in middle of words, such as ନିଃଶ୍ବାସ, ନିଃସ୍ବ, ନିଃସନ୍ଦେହ, ନିଃଶେଷ etc. All words with Bisarga aren't borrowed from Sanskrit.

=== Sinhala ===
In the Sinhala script, visarga is represented with two small circle to the right of a letter as ඃ.

=== Tamil ===
In the Tamil script, similar to visarga (which is called āyta eḻuttu (ஆய்த எழுத்து), āytam (ஆய்தம்), muppāl puḷḷi, taṉinilai, aḵkēṉam, ak), transliterated as ḵ, is represented with three small circles to the right of a letter as ஃ. Its used to transcribe an archaic /h/ sound inherited from the proto Dravidian *H that has either become silent or geminates the next letter in unlearnt speech, or pronounced as /k/ or /h/ in careful speech. Like Sanskrit, it cannot add on to any letter and add aspiration to them. It should be always placed between a single short vowel and a hard consonant (க், ச், ட், த், ப், ற்) for example அஃது (aḵtu), எஃகு (eḵku). The āytam in modern Tamil is used to transcribe foreign phones like ஃப் (ஃp) for [f], ஃஜ (ஃj) for [z], ஃஸ (ஃs) for [z, ʒ] and ஃக (ஃk) for [x], similar to a nuqta.

=== Telugu ===
In the Telugu script, there are two visargas. One is represented with two small circles to the right of a letter ః. It brings an "ah" sound to the end of the letter.

=== Thai ===
In the Thai script, the visarga (known as the visanchani (วิสรรชนีย์) or nom nang thangkhu (นมนางทั้งคู่)) is represented with two small curled circles to the right of a letter as ◌ะ. It represents a glottal stop that follows the affected vowel.

== Glyph comparison ==
Comparison of anusvara in different scripts

Aramaic -
Kharoṣṭhī 𐨏	Ashoka Brahmi 𑀂	Kushana Brahmi (Note: The middle "Kushana" form of Brahmi is a later style that emerged as Brahmi scripts were beginning to proliferate. Gupta Brahmi was definitely a stylistic descendant from Kushana, but other Brahmi-derived scripts may have descended from earlier forms.) 𑀂	Tocharian (Note: Tocharian is probably derived from the middle period "Kushana" form of Brahmi, although artifacts from that time are not plentiful enough to establish a definite succession.) -
Gupta Brahmi 𑀂	Pallava -
Kadamba -
Bhaiksuki 𑰾	Siddhaṃ 𑖾	Grantha 𑌃	Cham ꩍ
Sinhala ඃ	Pyu / Old Mon (Note: Pyu and Old Mon are probably the precursors of the Burmese script, and may be derived from either the Pallava or Kadamba script) -
Tibetan ཿ	Newa 𑑅	Ahom -	Malayalam ഃ
Telugu ః	Burmese း
Lepcha -	Ranjana -	Saurashtra ꢁ	Dives Akuru 𑤻
Kannada ಃ	Kayah Li -
Limbu -	Soyombo (Note: May also be derived from Devangari (see bottom left of table)) 𑪗	Khmer ះ	Tamil ஃ
Chakma 𑄂	Tai Tham ᩡ
Meitei Mayek ꫵ	Gaudi -	Thai ะ	Lao ະ
Tai Le -
Marchen -	Tirhuta 𑓁	New Tai Lue -	Tai Viet -	Aksara Kawi 𑼃
'Phags-pa -	Odia ଃ	Sharada 𑆂	Rejang -	Batak -	Buginese -
Zanabazar Square 𑨹	Bengali–Assamese ঃ	Takri 𑚬	Javanese ꦃ	Balinese ᬄ	Makasar -
Hangul (Note: The Origin of Hangul from 'Phags-pa is one of limited influence, inspiring at most a few basic letter shapes. Hangul does not function as an Indic abugida.) -	Northern Nagari -	Dogri 𑠸	Laṇḍā -	Sundanese ᮂ	Baybayin -
Modi 𑘾	Gujarati ઃ	Khojki -	Khudabadi -	Mahajani -	Tagbanwa -
Devanagari ः	Nandinagari 𑧟	Kaithi 𑂂	Gurmukhi ਃ	Multani -	Buhid -
Canadian Syllabics (Note: Although the basic letter forms of the Canadian Aboriginal Syllabics were derived from handwritten Devanagari letters, this abugida indicates vowel sounds by rotations of the letter form, rather than the use of vowel diacritics as is standard in Indic abugidas.) -	Soyombo (Note: May also be derived from Ranjana (see above)) 𑪗	Sylheti Nagari -	Gunjala Gondi 𑶖	Masaram Gondi (Note: Masaram Gondi acts as an Indic abugida, but its letterforms were not derived from any single precursor script.) 𑵁	Hanuno'o -

== Unicode ==
Unicode encodes visarga and visarga-like characters for a variety of scripts:

=== Visarga ===
South Asian scripts
Script	Sign	Example	Unicode
Bengali	ঃ	কঃ	U+0983
Bhaiksuki	𑰾	𑰎𑰾	U+11C3E
Brahmi	𑀂	𑀓𑀂	U+11002
Chakma	𑄂	𑄇𑄂	U+11102
Devanagari	ः	कः	U+0903
Dogra	𑠸	𑠊𑠸	U+11838
Grantha	𑌃	𑌕𑌃	U+11303
Gujarati	ઃ	કઃ	U+0A83
Gunjala Gondi	𑶖	𑵱𑶖	U+11D96
Gurmukhi	ਃ	ਕਃ	U+0A03
Gurung Khema	𖄮	𖄁𖄮	U+1612E
Kaithi	𑂂	𑂍𑂂	U+11082
Kannada	ಃ	ಕಃ	U+0C83
Kharosthi	𐨏	𐨐𐨏	U+10A0F
Malayalam	ഃ	കഃ	U+0D03
Masaram Gondi	𑵁	𑴌𑵁	U+11D41
Modi	𑘾	𑘎𑘾	U+1163E
Mongolian	ᢁ᠋	ᢁ᠋ᠠ᠋	U+1881
Nandinagari	𑧟	𑦮𑧟	U+119DF
Odia	ଃ	କଃ	U+0B03
Prachalit Nepal	𑑅	𑐎𑑅	U+11445
Sharada	𑆂	𑆑𑆂	U+11182
Saurashtra	ꢁ	ꢒꢁ	U+A881
Siddham	𑖾	𑖎𑖾	U+115BE
Sinhala	ඃ	කඃ	U+0D83
Soyombo	𑪗	𑩜𑪗	U+11A97
Takri	𑚬	𑚊𑚬	U+116AC
Tamil	ஃ	கஃ	U+0B83
Telugu	ః	కః	U+0C03
Tibetan (rnam bcad)	ཿ	ཀཿ	U+0F7F
Tirhuta	𑓁	𑒏𑓁	U+114C1
Zanabazar Square	𑨹	𑨋𑨹	U+11A39

Southeast Asian scripts
Script	Sign	Example	Unicode
Balinese (bisah)	ᬄ	ᬓᬄ	U+1B04
Burmese	း	ကး	U+1038
Javanese (wignyan)	ꦃ	ꦏꦃ	U+A983
Kawi	𑼃	𑼒𑼃	U+11F02
Khmer (reahmuk)	ះ	កះ	U+17C7
Lao	ະ	ກະ	U+0EB0
Sundanese (pangwisad)	◌ᮂ	ᮊᮂ	U+1B82
Thai (visanchani)	ะ	กะ	U+0E30
Tai Tham (a)	ᩡ	ᨠᩡ	U+0E30

=== Jihvamuliya and Upadhmaniya ===
Script	Jihvamuliya		Upadhmaniya	
Script	Sign	Unicode	Sign	Unicode
Brahmi	𑀃	U+11003	𑀄	U+11004
Kannada	ೱ	U+0CF1	ೲ	U+0CF2
Newa	𑑠	U+11460	𑑡	U+11461
Sharada	𑇂	U+111C2	𑇃	U+111C3
Soyombo	𑪄	U+11A84	𑪅	U+11A85
Various (Vedic texts)	ᳵ	U+1CF5	ᳶ	U+1CF6
