= Character Map (Windows) =

Windows utility displaying characters in a font

- Other names: charmap.exe
- Developer(s): Microsoft
- Stable release: 5.2.3668.0 / July 2009; 16 years ago
- Operating system: Windows NT 3.1, 3.5, 3.51, 4.0; Windows 2000, XP, Vista, 7, 8, 8.1, 10, 11
- Platform: IA-32, x86-64 and ARM (and historically DEC Alpha, Itanium, MIPS, and PowerPC)
- Type: Character map

Character Map is a utility included with Microsoft Windows operating systems and is used to view the characters in any installed font, to check what keyboard input (Alt code) is used to enter those characters, and to copy characters to the clipboard in lieu of typing them. Other operating systems have apps which do the same things that Character Map does; for example, Apple MacOS Character Viewer (formerly Character Palette).

== Overview ==
The tool is usually useful for entering special characters. It can be opened via the command-line interface or Run command dialog using the 'charmap' command.

The "Advanced view" check box can be used to inspect the character sets in a font according to different encodings (code pages), including Unicode code ranges, to locate particular characters by their Unicode code point and to search for characters by their Unicode name. For Unicode fonts, the characters can be grouped by their Unicode subrange. Although the Unicode standard already extends character field to plane 16 and many codepoints of plane 1 are assigned with characters, this tool still only supports code points on plane 0 (between U+0000 and U+FFFF). Additionally, it does not display certain characters in that range for reasons unexplained.

With all versions of Windows the utility can be started by entering charmap in the Start / Run dialog box. On Windows 2000, Windows XP, Windows Vista, and Windows 7, the utility is in All Programs → Accessories → System Tools → Character Map in the Start Menu. On Windows 10 and Windows 11, the utility is in the Windows Accessories/Windows tools folders in the Start Menu, respectively. Beginning with Windows Vista, the user can also type the name of the utility in the Start Menu search box.

A secondary character map program is accessible in a text field on Windows 10 and Windows 11 computers, using the keyboard shortcut ⊞ Win+., or the 😀 key in Windows 10's virtual touch keyboard, which is mainly used for the purposes of using emoji, but also allows access to a smaller set of special characters.

The Windows NT series of operating systems from Workstation and Server 4.0 build 1381 and the Windows 9x-series from Windows 95 onwards also contain the character map, as do versions of Windows CE using a GUI based on these systems' explorer.exe, introduced with Windows 95. Another version of the character map is found in the Progman.exe-based Windows 3.11 and Windows NT 3.51.

== Other operating systems ==
Other operating systems such as some Unix-Linux variants with GUIs, the HP-48 series graphing calculators and others also have a similar accessory.

The OS/2 analogue of the character map called Characters Map is available from third parties for systems from OS/2 Warp 3 onwards to current ArcaOS versions. The MacOS version is included in the Font Book app, and is shown when viewing the "Repertoire" of a font. A Linux GNUstep character map application, "Charmap", is developed by GNU Savannah.

== See also ==
- gucharmap (GNOME Character Map)
- BabelMap (includes tools for entering Chinese characters)
