= ITRANS =

ASCII transliteration for Indic scripts

The "Indian languages TRANSliteration" (ITRANS) is an ASCII transliteration scheme for Indic scripts, particularly for the Devanagari script.

The need for a simple encoding scheme that used only keys available on an ordinary keyboard was felt in the early days of the rec.music.indian.misc (RMIM) Usenet newsgroup where lyrics and trivia about Indian popular movie songs were being discussed. In parallel was a Sanskrit Mailing list that quickly felt the need of an exact and unambiguous encoding. ITRANS emerged on the RMIM newsgroup as early as 1994. This was spearheaded by Avinash Chopde, who developed a transliteration package. Its latest version is v5.34. The package also enables automatic conversion of the Roman script to the Indic version.

ITRANS was in use for the encoding of Indian etexts - it is wider in scope than the Harvard-Kyoto scheme for Devanagari transliteration, with which it coincides largely, but not entirely. The early Sanskrit mailing list of the early 1990s, almost same time as RMIM, developed into the full blown Sanskrit Documents project and now uses ITRANS extensively, with thousands of encoded texts. With the wider implementation of Unicode, the traditional IAST is used increasingly also for electronic texts.

Like the Harvard-Kyoto scheme, the ITRANS romanization only uses diacritical signs found on the common English-language computer keyboard, and it is quite easy to read and pick up.

== ITRANS transliteration scheme ==
ITRANS transliteration scheme is given in the tables below. The ITRANS method is without using diacritics, as compared to other transliteration methods. While using ITRANS, for proper nouns, first letter capitalization is not possible since, ITRANS uses both capital and small letters in its lettering scheme.

=== Vowels ===
Table: Vowels
Devanagari	Gurmukhi	Telugu	Kannada	Tamil	Malayalam	Bangla	Sinhala	ITRANS
अ	ਅ	అ	ಅ	அ	അ	অ	අ	a
आ	ਆ	ఆ	ಆ	ஆ	ആ	আ	ආ	A/aa
इ	ਇ	ఇ	ಇ	இ	ഇ	ই	ඉ	i
ई	ਈ	ఈ	ಈ	ஈ	ഈ	ঈ	ඊ	I/ii/ee
उ	ਉ	ఉ	ಉ	உ	ഉ	উ	උ	u
ऊ	ਊ	ఊ	ಊ	ஊ	ഊ	ঊ	ඌ	U/uu
ऋ		ఋ	ಋ		ഋ	ঋ	ඍ	RRi/R^i
ॠ		ౠ	ೠ		ൠ	ৠ	ඎ	RRI/R^I
ऌ		ఌ	ಌ		ഌ	ঌ	ඏ	LLi/L^i
ॡ		ౡ	ೡ		ൡ	ৡ	ඐ	LLI/L^I
ऎ (Note: Introduced in Parivardhita Devanagari to write Dravidian short-vowel 'e')								^e
ए	ਏ	ఎ	ಎ	எ	എ	এ	එ	e
ए	ਏ	ఏ	ಏ	ஏ	ഏ	এ	ඒ	E
ऍ							ඇ	ae
ऍ							ඈ	aE
ऐ	ਐ	ఐ	ಐ	ஐ	ഐ	ঐ	ඓ	ai
ऒ (Note: Introduced in Parivardhita Devanagari to write Dravidian short-vowel 'o')								^o
ओ	ਓ	ఒ	ಒ	ஒ	ഒ	ও	ඔ	o
ओ	ਓ	ఓ	ಓ	ஓ	ഓ	ও	ඕ	O
औ	ਔ	ఔ	ಔ	ஔ	ഔ	ঔ	ඖ	au
अं (Note: added as anusvāra)	ਂ/ ੰ	అం	ಅಂ		ം	অং	ං	M/.m/.n
अः	ਃ	ಅಃ	ಅಃ		ഃ	অঃ	ඃ	H
अँ	ਂ/ ੰ	అఁ				অঁ	ඁ	.N
् (Note: virāma/halant)	੍	్	್	்	്	্	්	.h (Note: absence of 'a' after a consonant should also kill the schwa automatically)
ऽ (Note: avagraha:elision during sandhi)		ఽ	ಽ		ഽ	ঽ		.a
ॐ (Note: Om symbol)		ఓం		ௐ				OM, AUM

=== Consonants ===
The Devanāgarī consonant letters include an implicit 'a' sound. In all of the transliteration systems, that 'a' sound must be represented explicitly.

==== Standard Indic consonants ====
Table: ITRANS Devanagari consonants
क	ख	ग	घ	ङ	Velar
ka	kha	ga	gha	~Na	
च	छ	ज	झ	ञ	Palatal
cha	Cha	ja	jha	~na	
ट	ठ	ड	ढ	ण	Retroflex
Ta	Tha	Da	Dha	Na	
त	थ	द	ध	न	Dental
ta	tha	da	dha	na	
प	फ	ब	भ	म	Labial
pa	pha	ba	bha	ma	
य	र	ल	व		Semi-vowel
ya	ra	la	va		
श	ष	स	ह	ळ	Fricative
sha	Sha	sa	ha	La	

==== Irregular consonant clusters ====
Devanāgarī	ITRANS
क्ष	kSa/kSha/xa
त्र	tra
ज्ञ	GYa/j~na
श्र	shra

==== Prenasalized consonants ====
Sanskrit	Sinhala	ITRANS
ङ्ग	ඟ	~Nga
ञ्ज	ඦ	~nja
ण्ड	ඬ	NDa
न्द	ඳ	nda
म्ब	ඹ	mba

==== Consonants with Nuqta ====
Devanāgarī	ITRANS
क़	qa
ख़	Ka
ग़	Ga
ज़	za
फ़	fa
ड़	.Da/Ra
ढ़	.Dha/Rha
व़	wa

==== Dravidian consonants ====
Devanagari	Tamil	Malayalam	ITRANS
ऴ	ழ	ഴ	zha
ऱ	ற	റ	^ra
ऩ	ன	ഩ	^na

== Examples ==
- vikipiiDiyaa – विकिपीडिया
- bhaarat – भारत
- raam – राम
- lakShmaN – लक्ष्मण
- iNDiyaa – इण्डिया
- maiM hindii meM Taaip kar saktaa huuM | – मैं हिन्दी में टाइप कर सकता हूँ।
- aao hindii meM kampyuuTar pe likheM – आओ हिन्दी में कम्प्यूटर पे लिखें
- hama bhojapurI me likha sakIlA - 𑂯𑂧 𑂦𑂷𑂔𑂣𑂳𑂩𑂲 𑂧𑂵 𑂪𑂱𑂎 𑂮𑂍𑂲𑂪𑂰

== Limitations ==
Since ITRANS was primarily designed for Sanskrit (and other modern Indo-Aryan languages), it lacks full-coverage for Indic scripts of other languages. Specifically, the support for Dravidian short-vowels 'e' and 'o' is considered ambiguous (since Indo-Aryan phonology does not differentiate them from long-vowels 'E' and 'O'). Also, the schwa used in languages like Bengali ([ɔ]) and Assamese ([ɒ]) differs from that of other languages ([ə]), causing a dissonant feeling when typing those languages. Moreover, although both Bengali and Assamese use Eastern Nagari, the phonology of Assamese varies from that of Bengali to a significant extent, causing more friction while typing Assamese.

The support for many phones of other languages like Dravidian, Hindustani nuqtas, Sinhala etc. is considered patchy and not consistent across implementations due to lack of standardization. Also, almost no ITRANS implementation fully supports languages like Kashmiri, Sindhi, etc.

== New version ==
The ambiguity around Dravidian short-vowels 'e' and 'o' support has been addressed with a new ISO15919 compliant coding scheme, which is uniform across all supported languages/scripts, including nukta. The old version ITRANS 5.3 is maintained for backward compatibility.

The changed ones are listed below:

Changed mapping
Devanagari	Gurumukhi	Telugu	Kannada	Tamil	Malayalam	Bangala	ITRANS
ऎ		ఎ	ಎ	எ	എ		e
ए	ਏ	ఏ	ಏ	ஏ	ഏ	এ	E
ऒ		ఒ	ಒ	ஒ	ഒ		o
ओ	ਓ	ఓ	ಓ	ஓ	ഓ	ও	O
ऱ				ற	റ		Ra

The newly launched revamped package supports both the old ITRANS V-5.3 scheme as well as the ISO15919 scheme.

In addition, the new package can be customized for any specific INPUT codes.

== See also ==
- Devanagari transliteration
- Velthuis
- IAST
- Harvard-Kyoto
- National Library at Kolkata romanisation
