= United Nations romanization systems for geographical names =

The United Nations romanization systems for geographical names (U.N.R.S.G.N.) are alternative romanization systems to ISO romanization developed by the United Nations Group of Experts on Geographical Names under the United Nations Statistical Commission.
