= GNOME Character Map =

Unicode character map program

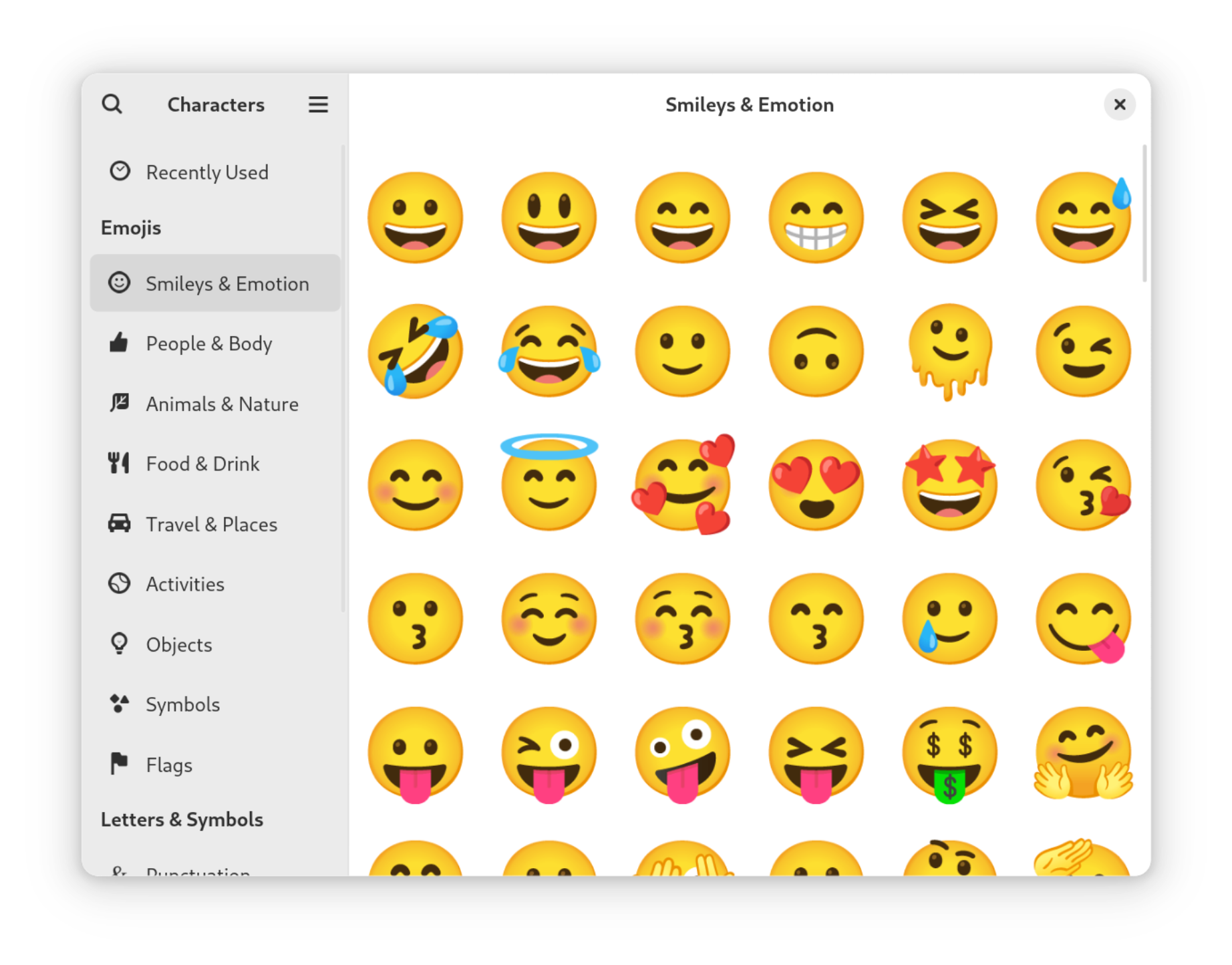
- Developer: Noah Levitt
- Stable release: 17.0.2 / 14 March 2026; 5 months ago
- Operating system: Unix-like
- Type: Character map
- License: GPL-3.0-or-later
- Website: wiki.gnome.org/Apps/Gucharmap
- Repository: gitlab.gnome.org/GNOME/gucharmap

GNOME Character Map, formerly and internally known as Gucharmap, is a free and open-source software Unicode character map program, being one of the GNOME Core Applications. This program allows characters to be displayed by Unicode block or script type. It includes brief descriptions of related characters and occasionally meanings of the character in question. Gucharmap can also be used to input or enter characters (by copy and paste). The search functionality allows the use of several search methods, including by Unicode name or code point of the character. It is built on the GTK toolkit and can be run on any platform supported by GTK. A number of text programs use Gucharmap for character input.

An important part of the code, the unicode browser widget itself, is available in the library libgucharmap. This library is included in various other applications in order to have a built in character browser. Some applications using libgucharmap are Abiword, Gedit (via a plugin) and Bluefish.

== History ==
Version 0.1 of the program was released on December 13, 2002, with basic Unicode font viewing capabilities which were slowly developed. On July 2, 2003, it was decided that Gucharmap would be included in GNOME 2.4. Two months later on September 10 version 1.0.0 was released with bug fixes and translation updates for inclusion with GNOME 2.4.

== Gucharmap ==
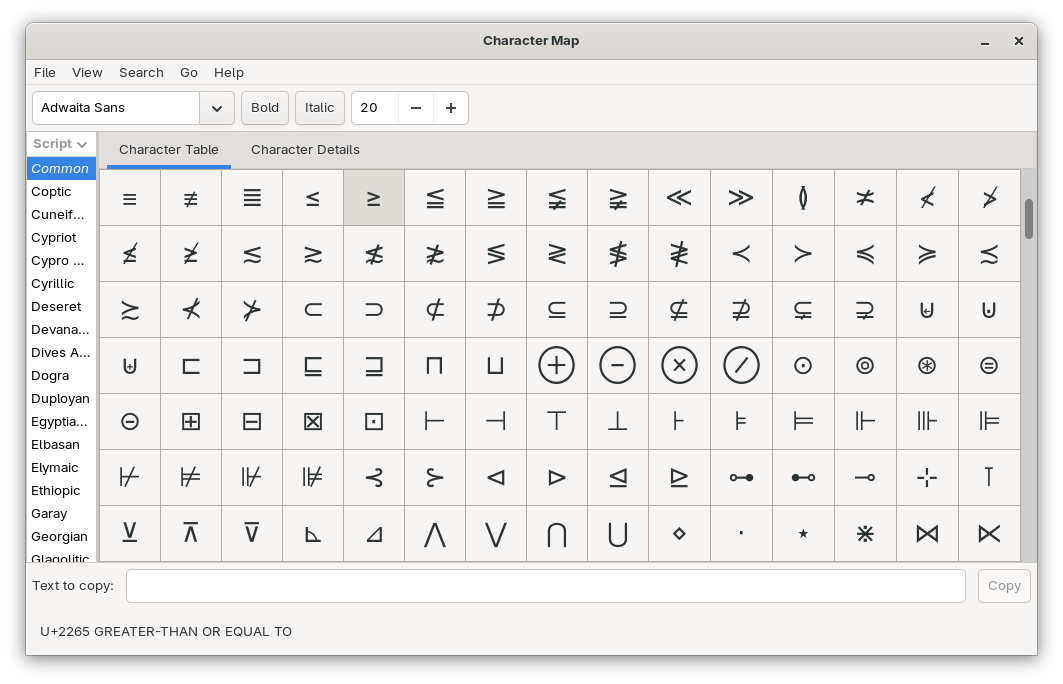
Screenshot of gucharmap

The new GNOME Character Map and the older Gucharmap are noticeably different.

- https://wiki.gnome.org/Apps/Gucharmap
- https://apps.gnome.org/Characters
- https://gitlab.gnome.org/GNOME/gucharmap
- https://gitlab.gnome.org/GNOME/gnome-characters

== See also ==
- Characters (a modern GNOME app with a more user-friendly interface)
- KCharSelect (a KDE character mapping tool)
- Private Character Editor
- Character Map (equivalent program bundled with Windows)
- BabelMap (freeware program for Windows with similar functions)
