= International Alphabet of Sanskrit Transliteration =

Transliteration scheme for Indic scripts

International Alphabet of Sanskrit Transliteration IAST
- Script type: Alphabet romanisation
- Period: 19th century–present
- Languages: Sanskrit and other Indic Languages

The International Alphabet of Sanskrit Transliteration (IAST) is a transliteration scheme that allows the lossless romanisation of Indic scripts as employed by Sanskrit and related Indic languages. It is based on a scheme that emerged during the 19th century from suggestions by Charles Trevelyan, William Jones, Monier Monier-Williams and other scholars, and formalised by the Transliteration Committee of the Geneva Oriental Congress, in September 1894. IAST makes it possible for the reader to read the Indic text unambiguously, exactly as if it were in the original Indic script.

== Usage ==
Scholars commonly use IAST in publications that cite textual material in Sanskrit, Pāḷi and other classical Indian languages.

IAST is also used for major e-text repositories such as SARIT, Muktabodha, GRETIL, and sanskritdocuments.org.

The IAST scheme is the most common system used for more than a century in scholarly books and journals on classical Indian studies, though often with some minor variations, such as common usage of ṃ instead of ṁ (and occasional usage of r̥ instead of ṛ, especially in materials where the Devanagari letter ड़, used in Hindi, needs to be distinguished). More recently, the ISO 15919 standard for transliterating Indic scripts emerged in 2001 from the standards and library worlds. For the most part, ISO 15919 follows the IAST scheme, departing from it only in minor ways (e.g., ḷ/l̥ and ṛ/r̥), the most notable being ISO 15919 ē, ō representing what IAST translates as e, o which in the ISO denote short vowels (a practice commonly established among scholars in Dravidian studies—see comparison below.

The Indian National Library at Kolkata romanization, intended for the romanisation of all Indic scripts, is an extension of IAST.

== History ==
The Tenth International Congress of Orientalists, held at Geneva on 10 September 1894, adopted the following notations:

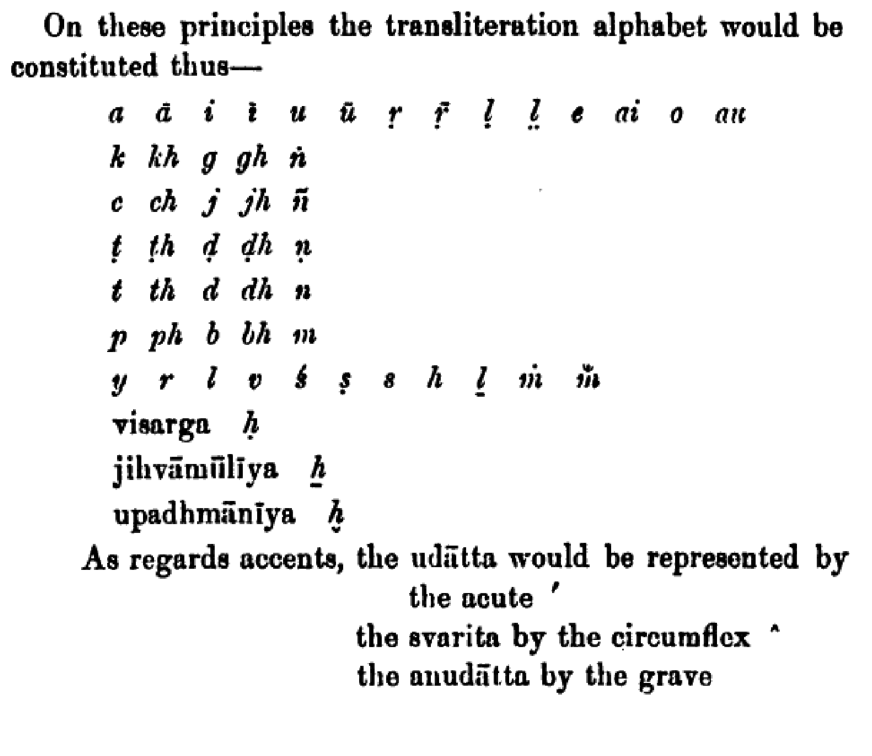
Table from the Report of Transliteration Committee, Pg 887

	a	ā	i	ī	u	ū	ṛ	ṝ	ḷ	l̤	e	ai	o	au
	k	kh	g	gh	ṅ									
	c	ch	j	jh	ñ									
	ṭ	ṭh	ḍ	ḍh	ṇ									
	t	th	d	dh	n									
	p	ph	b	bh	m									
	y	r	l	v	ś	ṣ	s	h	ḻ	ṁ	m̐			
visarga	ḥ													
jihvāmūlīya	ẖ													
upadhmānīya	ḫ													

For the short e and o, the Committee also recommended the use of ĕ and ŏ, respectively.

IAST itself

The description of IAST's predecessor, CS Indic, has a "history" section that describes the genesis of the encoding.

== Inventory and conventions ==
The IAST letters are listed with their Devanagari equivalents and phonetic values in IPA, valid for Sanskrit, Hindi and other modern languages that use Devanagari script, but some phonological changes have occurred:

Vowels and codas
Devanāgarī	Transcription		IPA for Sanskrit pronunciation	Category
अ	a	A	ɐ	monophthongs
आ	ā	Ā	aː	monophthongs
इ	i	I	ɪ	monophthongs
ई	ī	Ī	iː	monophthongs
उ	u	U	ʊ	monophthongs
ऊ	ū	Ū	uː	monophthongs
ऋ	ṛ	Ṛ	r̩	syllabic liquids
ॠ	ṝ	Ṝ	r̩ː	syllabic liquids
ऌ	ḷ	Ḷ	l̩	syllabic liquids
ॡ	ḹ	Ḹ	l̩ː	syllabic liquids
ए	e	E	e	diphthongs
ऐ	ai	Ai	ɐi̯	diphthongs
ओ	o	O	o	diphthongs
औ	au	Au	ɐu̯	diphthongs
ं	ṃ	Ṃ		anusvara
ः	ḥ	Ḥ		visarga
ँ	m̐	M̐		chandrabindu
ऽ	'			avagraha
ᳵ	ẖ			jihvamuliya
ᳶ	ḫ			upadhmaniya

Consonants
glottals	velars	palatals	retroflexes	dentals	labials	Category
	क k K	च c C	ट ṭ Ṭ	त t T	प p P	tenuis stops
	ख kh Kh	छ ch Ch	ठ ṭh Ṭh	थ th Th	फ ph Ph	aspirated stops
	ग g G	ज j J	ड ḍ Ḍ	द d D	ब b B	voiced stops
	घ gh Gh	झ jh Jh	ढ ḍh Ḍh	ध dh Dh	भ bh Bh	breathy-voiced stops
	ङ ṅ Ṅ	ञ ñ Ñ	ण ṇ Ṇ	न n N	म m M	nasal stops
ह h H		य y Y	र r R	ल l L	व v V	approximants and fricatives
		श ś Ś	ष ṣ Ṣ	स s S		sibilants
			ळ ḻ Ḻ			approximants (Vedic)

Some letters are modified with diacritics: Long vowels are marked with an overline (often called a macron). Vocalic (syllabic) consonants, retroflexes and ṣ (/ʂ/ in Sanskrit, /ʃ/ in Hindi) have an underdot. One letter has an overdot: ṅ (/ŋ/). One has an acute accent: ś (/ɕ/ in Sanskrit, /ʃ/ in Hindi). One letter has a line below: ḻ (/ɭ/) (the intervocalic allophone of ḍ in Vedic Sanskrit).

Unlike ASCII-only romanisations such as ITRANS or Harvard-Kyoto, the diacritics used for IAST allow capitalisation of proper names. The capital variants of letters never occurring word-initially (Ṃ Ṇ Ṅ Ñ Ṝ Ḹ) are useful only when writing in all-caps and in Pāṇini contexts for which the convention is to typeset the IT sounds as capital letters.

== Comparison with ISO 15919 ==
For the most part, IAST is a subset of ISO 15919 that merges the retroflex (underdotted) liquids with the vocalic ones (ringed below) and the short close-mid vowels with the long ones. The following seven exceptions are from the ISO standard accommodating an extended repertoire of symbols to allow transliteration of Devanāgarī and other Indic scripts as used for languages other than Sanskrit.

Devanāgarī	IAST	ISO 15919	Comment
ए / े	e	ē (e)	ISO e generally represents short ऎ / ॆ, but optionally represents long ए / े in the Devanagari, Bengali, Gurmukhi, Gujarati, and Odia scripts.
ओ / ो	o	ō (o)	ISO o generally represents short ऒ / ॆ, but optionally represents long ओ / ो in the Devanagari, Bengali, Gurmukhi, Gujarati, and Odia scripts.
ऎ / ॆ	ĕ	e	ISO e generally represents short ऎ / ॆ, but optionally represents long ए / े in the Devanagari, Bengali, Gurmukhi, Gujarati, and Odia scripts. The IAST ĕ represents short ऎ / ॆ.
ऒ / ॆ	ŏ	o	ISO o generally represents short ऒ / ॆ, but optionally represents long ओ / ो in the Devanagari, Bengali, Gurmukhi, Gujarati, and Odia scripts. The IAST ŏ represents short ऒ / ॆ.
ऋ / ृ	ṛ	r̥	ISO ṛ represents ड़ /ɽ/.
ॠ / ॄ	ṝ	r̥̄	for consistency with r̥.
ऌ / ॢ	ḷ	l̥	ISO ḷ represents ळ /ɭ/.
ॡ / ॣ	ḹ	l̥̄	for consistency with l̥.
ं	ṃ	ṁ	ISO ṃ represents Gurmukhi tippi (ੰ).
ळ	ḻ	ḷ	Used in Vedic Sanskrit only and not found in the classical variant.

== Computer input by alternative keyboard layout ==
The most convenient method of inputting romanized Sanskrit is by setting up an alternative keyboard layout. This allows one to hold a modifier key to type letters with diacritical marks. For example, alt+a = ā. How this is set up varies by operating system and user-preference.

Linux/Unix and BSD desktop environment users can select custom keyboard layouts and switch them by clicking a flag icon in the menu bar, or via the appropriate settings and accessibility menus, based on the distribution and version they are using. Keyboards for typing Sanskrit, Hindi and many other Indian languages, in original script and in transliteration, are delivered as standard features in Ubuntu, Linux Mint and similar Linux systems. For others, such keyboards can be installed without much difficulty, along with community support for specific or special keyboards.

macOS users can use the pre-installed US International keyboard, or install a Unicode keyboard layout.

Microsoft Windows users can change keyboard layouts and set up additional custom keyboard mappings for IAST. This Pali keyboard installer made by Microsoft Keyboard Layout Creator (MSKLC) supports IAST (works on Microsoft Windows up to at least version 10, can use Alt button on the right side of the keyboard instead of Ctrl+Alt combination).

Android keyboard called "Sanskrit (Latin)" offers IAST and ISO characters - these can be entered by holding the key for the corresponding letters without diacritic: e.g. holding "s" calls a selection between ś and ṣ.

== Computer input by selection from a screen ==
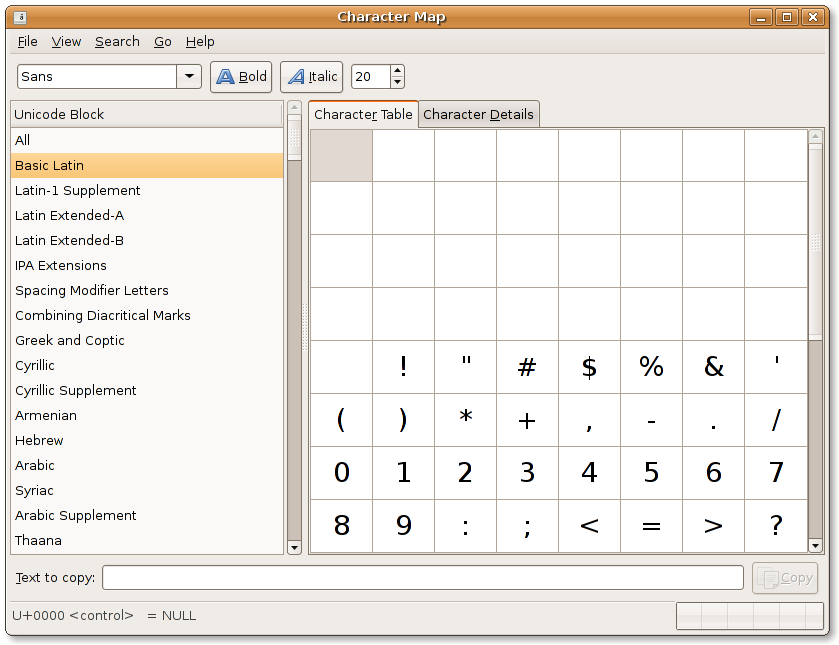
Applet for character selection

Many systems provide a way to select Unicode characters visually. ISO/IEC 14755 refers to this as a screen-selection entry method.

Microsoft Windows has provided a Unicode version of the Character Map program (find it by hitting ⊞ Win+R then type charmap then hit ↵ Enter) since version NT 4.0 – appearing in the consumer edition since XP. This is limited to characters in the Basic Multilingual Plane (BMP). Characters are searchable by Unicode character name, and the table can be limited to a particular code block. More advanced third-party tools of the same type are also available (a notable freeware example is BabelMap).

macOS provides a "character palette" with much the same functionality, along with searching by related characters, glyph tables in a font, etc. It can be enabled in the input menu in the menu bar under System Preferences → International → Input Menu (or System Preferences → Language and Text → Input Sources) or can be viewed under Edit → Emoji & Symbols in many programs.

Equivalent tools – such as gucharmap (GNOME) or kcharselect (KDE) – exist on most Linux desktop environments.

Users of SCIM on Linux based platforms can also have the opportunity to install and use the sa-itrans-iast input handler which provides complete support for the ISO 15919 standard for the romanization of Indic languages as part of the m17n library.

Or user can use some Unicode characters in Latin-1 Supplement, Latin Extended-A, Latin Extended Additional and Combining Diarcritical Marks block to write IAST.

== Font support ==
Only certain fonts support all the Latin Unicode characters essential for the transliteration of Indic scripts according to the IAST and ISO 15919 standards.

For example, the commercially-licensed Arial, Tahoma and Times New Roman font packages that come with Microsoft Office 2007 and later versions also support precomposed Unicode characters like ī.

Junicode, Libertinus, the TeX Gyre family and Google's Noto font are just a few high-quality free fonts that include pre-composed IAST characters.

Many other text fonts commonly used for book production may be lacking in support for one or more characters from this block. Accordingly, many academics working in the area of Sanskrit studies make use of free OpenType fonts such as FreeSerif or Gentium, both of which have complete support for the full repertoire of conjoined diacritics in the IAST character set. Released under the GNU FreeFont or SIL Open Font License, respectively, such fonts may be freely shared and do not require the person reading or editing a document to purchase proprietary software to make use of its associated fonts.

== See also ==
- Devanagari transliteration
- Āryabhaṭa numeration
- Hunterian transliteration
- Harvard-Kyoto
- ITRANS
- ISO 15919
- National Library at Kolkata romanisation
- Shiva Sutras
- Template:IAST
