= National Library at Kolkata romanisation =

Transliteration scheme for Indic languages

The National Library at Kolkata romanisation is a widely used transliteration scheme in dictionaries and grammars of Indic languages. Also known as the Library of Congress, this transliteration scheme is nearly identical to one of the possible ISO 15919 variants. The scheme is an extension of the IAST scheme that is used for the transliteration of Sanskrit.

== Scheme table ==
The table below mostly uses Devanagari but it also includes letters from Bengali (purple) and Tamil (green) to illustrate the transliteration of non-Devanagari characters.

| अ | आ | इ | ई | उ | ऊ | ऋ | ॠ | ऌ | ऎ | ए | ऐ | ऍ | ऒ | ओ | औ | अं | अः |
| a | ā | i | ī | u | ū | ṛ | ṝ | ḻ | e | ē | ai | ê | o | ō | au | aṃ | aḥ |

| क | ख | ग | घ | ङ | च | छ | ज | झ | ञ |
| ka | kha | ga | gha | ṅa | ca | cha | ja | jha | ña |

| ट | ठ | ड | ढ | ण | त | थ | द | ध | न |
| ṭa | ṭha | ḍa | ḍha | ṇa | ta | tha | da | dha | na |

| प | फ | ब | भ | म | য | ழ | ळ | ற | ன |
| pa | pha | ba | bha | ma | ẏa | ẕa | ḷa | ṟa | ṉa |

| य | र | ल | व | श | ष | स | ह |
| ya | ra | la | va | śa | ṣa | sa | ha |

| क़ | ख़ | ग़ | ज़ | ड़ | ढ़ | फ़ |
| qa | k͟ha | g͟ha | za | d̂a | d̂ha | fa |

== Computer input by selection from a screen ==
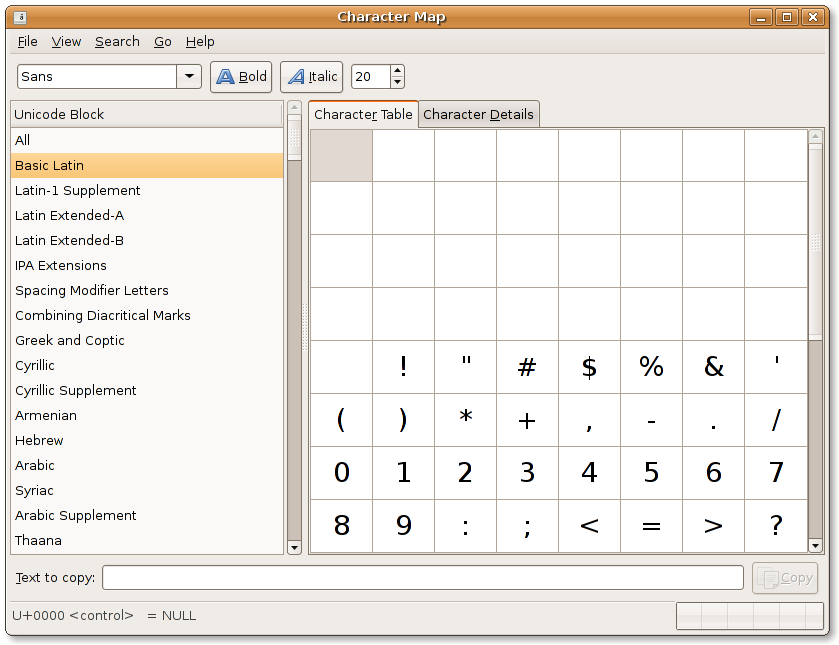
Applet for character selection

Many systems provide a way to select Unicode characters visually. ISO/IEC 14755 refers to this as a screen-selection entry method.

Microsoft Windows has provided a Unicode version of the Character Map program (find it by hitting ⊞ Win+R then type charmap then hit ↵ Enter) since version NT 4.0 – appearing in the consumer edition since XP. This is limited to characters in the Basic Multilingual Plane (BMP). Characters are searchable by Unicode character name, and the table can be limited to a particular code block. More advanced third-party tools of the same type are also available (a notable freeware example is BabelMap).

macOS provides a "character palette" with much the same functionality, along with searching by related characters, glyph tables in a font, etc. It can be enabled in the input menu in the menu bar under System Preferences → International → Input Menu (or System Preferences → Language and Text → Input Sources) or can be viewed under Edit → Emoji & Symbols in many programs.

Equivalent tools – such as gucharmap (GNOME) or kcharselect (KDE) – exist on most Linux desktop environments.

== Font support ==
Only certain fonts support all Latin Unicode characters for the transliteration of Indic scripts according to the ISO 15919 standard. For example, Tahoma supports almost all the characters needed. Arial and Times New Roman font packages that come with Microsoft Office 2007 and later also support most Latin Extended Additional characters like ḍ, ḥ, ḷ, ḻ, ṁ, ṅ, ṇ, ṛ, ṣ and ṭ. The open-source fonts Libertinus Serif and Libertinus Sans (forked from the Linux Libertine project) also have full support.

== Literature ==
- Aggarwal, Narindar K. 1985 (1978). A Bibliography of Studies on Hindi Language and Linguistics. 2nd edition. Indian Documentation Service / Academic Press: Gurgaon, Haryana.

== See also ==
- Brahmic scripts#Comparison
- Devanagari transliteration
- Shiva Sutras
