= ISO 15919 =

Standard for romanization of Indic scripts

ISO 15919 is an international standard for the romanization of Indic scripts. Published in 2001, it is part of a series of romanization standards by the International Organization for Standardization.

== Overview ==
ISO 15919 transliterations
ISO	7-bit ISO	Devanagari	Nastaliq	Bengali	Gurmukhi	Gujarati	Odia	Tamil	Telugu	Malayalam	Kannada	Kaithi	Sinhala	Tibetan	Thai	Saurashtra
a		अ	اَ	অ	ਅ	અ	ଅ	அ	అ	അ	ಅ	𑂃	අ	ཨ	อ	ꢂ
ā	aa	आ	آ	আ	ਆ	આ	ଆ	ஆ	ఆ	ആ	ಆ	𑂄	ආ	ཨཱ	อา	ꢃ
æ	ae												ඇ			
ǣ	aee												ඈ			
i		इ	اِ	ই	ਇ	ઇ	ଇ	இ	ఇ	ഇ	ಇ	𑂅	ඉ	ཨི	อิ	ꢄ
ī	ii	ई	اِی	ঈ	ਈ	ઈ	ଈ	ஈ	ఈ	ഈ	ಈ	𑂆	ඊ	ཨཱི	อี	ꢅ
u		उ	اُ	উ	ਉ	ઉ	ଉ	உ	ఉ	ഉ	ಉ	𑂇	උ	ཨུ	อุ	ꢆ
ū	uu	ऊ	اُو	ঊ	ਊ	ઊ	ଊ	ஊ	ఊ	ഊ	ಊ	𑂈	ඌ	ཨཱུ	อู	ꢇ
ŭ	^u									്						
r̥	,r	ऋ		ঋ		ઋ	ଋ		ఋ	ഋ	ಋ		ඍ	རྀ	ฤ	ꢈ
r̥̄	,rr	ॠ		ৠ		ૠ	ୠ		ౠ	ൠ	ೠ		ඎ	རཱྀ	ฤๅ	ꢉ
l̥	,l	ऌ		ঌ		ઌ	ଌ		ఌ	ഌ	ಌ		ඏ	ལྀ	ฦ	ꢊ
l̥̄	,ll	ॡ		ৡ		ૡ	ୡ		ౡ	ൡ	ೡ		ඐ	ལཱྀ	ฦๅ	ꢋ
e		ऎ						எ	ఎ	എ	ಎ		එ			ꢌ
ē	ee	ए	اے	এ	ਏ	એ	ଏ	ஏ	ఏ	ഏ	ಏ	𑂉	ඒ	ཨེ	เอ	ꢍ
ê	^e	ऍ		অ্যা		ઍ										
ai	ai	ऐ	اَے	ঐ	ਐ	ઐ	ଐ	ஐ	ఐ	ഐ	ಐ	𑂊	ඓ	ཨཻ	ไอ	ꢎ
o		ऒ						ஒ	ఒ	ഒ	ಒ		ඔ			ꢏ
ō	oo	ओ	او	ও	ਓ	ઓ	ଓ	ஓ	ఓ	ഓ	ಓ	𑂋	ඕ	ཨོ	โอ	ꢐ
ô	^o	ऑ		অ		ઑ										
au		औ	اَو	ঔ	ਔ	ઔ	ଔ	ஔ	ఔ	ഔ	ಔ	𑂌	ඖ	ཨཽ	เอา	ꢑ
ṁ	;m	ं	ں	ং	ਂ	ં	ଂ	ஂ	ం	ം	ಂ		ං	ཾ	อํ	
ṃ	.m				ੰ											
m̐	~m	ँ	ں	ঁ	ਁ	ઁ	ଁ		ఀ					ྃ		
n̆	^n								ఁ							
ḥ	.h	ः	ہ	ঃ	ਃ	ઃ	ଃ		ః	ഃ	ಃ		ඃ	ཿ		
ẖ	_h	ᳵ									ೱ			ྈ		
ḫ	^h	ᳶ									ೲ			ྉ		
ḵ	_k							ஃ								
k		क	ک	ক	ਕ	ક	କ	க	క	ക	ಕ	𑂍	ක	ཀ	ก	ꢒ
kh		ख	کھ	খ	ਖ	ખ	ଖ		ఖ	ഖ	ಖ	𑂎	ඛ	ཁ	ข	ꢓ
g		ग	گ	গ	ਗ	ગ	ଗ		గ	ഗ	ಗ	𑂏	ග	ག	ค	ꢔ
gh		घ	گھ	ঘ	ਘ	ઘ	ଘ		ఘ	ഘ	ಘ	𑂐	ඝ	གྷ	ฆ	ꢕ
ṅ	;n	ङ	ن٘	ঙ	ਙ	ઙ	ଙ	ங	ఙ	ങ	ಙ	𑂑	ඞ	ང	ง	ꢖ
n̆g	^ng												ඟ			
c		च	چ	চ	ਚ	ચ	ଚ	ச	చ	ച	ಚ	𑂒	ච	ཅ	จ	ꢗ
ch		छ	چھ	ছ	ਛ	છ	ଛ		ఛ	ഛ	ಛ	𑂓	ඡ	ཆ	ฉ	ꢘ
ĉ	^c	च़							ౘ					ཙ		
ĉh	^ch	छ़												ཚ		
j		ज	ج	জ	ਜ	જ	ଜ	ஜ	జ	ജ	ಜ	𑂔	ජ	ཇ	ช	ꢙ
jh		झ	جھ	ঝ	ਝ	ઝ	ଝ		ఝ	ഝ	ಝ	𑂕	ඣ	ཇྷ	ฌ	ꢚ
ñ	~n	ञ	ڃ	ঞ	ਞ	ઞ	ଞ	ஞ	ఞ	ഞ	ಞ	𑂖	ඤ	ཉ	ญ	ꢛ
n̆j	^nj												ඦ			
ṭ	.t	ट	ٹ	ট	ਟ	ટ	ଟ	ட	ట	ട	ಟ	𑂗	ට	ཊ	ฏ	ꢜ
ṭh	.th	ठ	ٹھ	ঠ	ਠ	ઠ	ଠ		ఠ	ഠ	ಠ	𑂘	ඨ	ཋ	ฐ	ꢝ
ḍ	.d	ड	ڈ	ড	ਡ	ડ	ଡ		డ	ഡ	ಡ	𑂙	ඩ	ཌ	ฑ	ꢞ
ḍh	.dh	ढ	ڈھ	ঢ	ਢ	ઢ	ଢ		ఢ	ഢ	ಢ	𑂛	ඪ	ཌྷ	ฒ	ꢟ
ṛ	.r	ड़	ڑ	ড়	ੜ		ଡ଼							ཬ		
ṛh	.rh	ढ़	ڑھ	ঢ়			ଢ଼							ཬྷ		
ṇ	.n	ण	ݨ	ণ	ਣ	ણ	ଣ	ண	ణ	ണ	ಣ	𑂝	ණ	ཎ	ณ	ꢠ
n̆ḍ	^n.d												ඬ			
t		त	ت	ত	ਤ	ત	ତ	த	త	ത	ತ	𑂞	ත	ཏ	ต	ꢡ
th		थ	تھ	থ	ਥ	થ	ଥ		థ	ഥ	ಥ	𑂟	ථ	ཐ	ถ	ꢢ
d		द	د	দ	ਦ	દ	ଦ		ద	ദ	ದ	𑂠	ද	ད	ท	ꢣ
dh		ध	دھ	ধ	ਧ	ધ	ଧ		ధ	ധ	ಧ	𑂡	ධ	དྷ	ธ	ꢤ
n		न	ن	ন	ਨ	ન	ନ	ந	న	ന	ನ	𑂢	න	ན	น	ꢥ
n̆d	^nd												ඳ			
p		प	پ	প	ਪ	પ	ପ	ப	ప	പ	ಪ	𑂣	ප	པ	ป	ꢦ
ph		फ	پھ	ফ	ਫ	ફ	ଫ		ఫ	ഫ	ಫ	𑂤	ඵ	ཕ	ผ	ꢧ
b		ब	ب	ব	ਬ	બ	ବ		బ	ബ	ಬ	𑂥	බ	བ	พ	ꢨ
bh		भ	بھ	ভ	ਭ	ભ	ଭ		భ	ഭ	ಭ	𑂦	භ	བྷ	ภ	ꢩ
m		म	م	ম	ਮ	મ	ମ	ம	మ	മ	ಮ	𑂧	ම	མ	ม	ꢪ
m̆b	^mb												ඹ			
ṟ	_r	ऱ		র়				ற	ఱ	റ	ಱ					
ṯ	_t	त़								ഺ						
ṉ	_n	ऩ		ন়				ன		ഩ						
ḻ	_l	ऴ						ழ	ఴ	ഴ	ೞ					
y	y	य	ی	য	ਯ	ય	ଯ	ய	య	യ	ಯ	𑂨	ය	ཡ	ย	ꢫ
ẏ	;y	य़		য়			ୟ									
r		र	ر	র, ৰ	ਰ	ર	ର	ர	ర	ര	ರ	𑂩	ර	ར	ร	ꢬ
r̆	^r	र्‍														
l		ल	ل	ল	ਲ	લ	ଲ	ல	ల	ല	ಲ	𑂪	ල	ལ	ล	ꢭ
ḷ	.l	ळ	لؕ		ਲ਼	ળ	ଳ	ள	ళ	ള	ಳ		ළ		ฬ	ꢳ
v		व	و	ৱ	ਵ	વ	ଵ	வ	వ	വ	ವ	𑂫	ව	ཝ	ว	ꢮ
ś	sh	श	ش	শ	ਸ਼	શ	ଶ	ஶ	శ	ശ	ಶ	𑂬	ශ	ཤ	ศ	ꢯ
ṣ	.s	ष		ষ		ષ	ଷ	ஷ	ష	ഷ	ಷ	𑂭	ෂ	ཥ	ษ	ꢰ
s		स	س	স	ਸ	સ	ସ	ஸ	స	സ	ಸ	𑂮	ස	ས	ส	ꢱ
h		ह	ہ	হ	ਹ	હ	ହ	ஹ	హ	ഹ	ಹ	𑂯	හ	ཧ	ห	ꢲ
'	'	ऽ		ঽ		ઽ	ଽ		ఽ	ഽ	ಽ			྅		
q		क़	ق	ক়	ਕ਼	ક઼								ཫ		
k͟h	_kh	ख़	خ	খ়	ਖ਼	ખ઼								ཁ༹		
ġ	.g	ग़	غ	গ়	ਗ਼	ગ઼								ག༹		
z		ज़	ز	জ়	ਜ਼	જ઼			ౙ		ಜ಼			ཟ		
ž	^z	झ़	ژ	ঝ়	ਝ਼									ཞ		
f		फ़	ف	ফ়	ਫ਼	ફ઼					ಫ಼		ෆ	ཕ༹		
w		व़	و	ৱ়			ୱ									
s̱	_s		ث													
s̤	,s		ص													
h̤	,h		ح													
t̤	,t		ط													
ʻ	.		ع													
ẕ	_z		ذ													
ż	;z		ض													
ẓ	.z		ظ													

== Relation to other systems ==
ISO 15919 is an international standard for the romanization of many Brahmic scripts, which was agreed upon in 2001 by a network of the national standards institutes of 157 countries. However, the Hunterian transliteration system is the "de facto national system of romanization in India" and a United Nations expert group noted about ISO 15919 that "there is no evidence of the use of the system either in India or in international cartographic products."

Another standard, United Nations Romanization Systems for Geographical Names (UNRSGN), was developed by the United Nations Group of Experts on Geographical Names (UNGEGN) and covers many Brahmic scripts.

The ALA-LC romanization was approved by the Library of Congress and the American Library Association and is a US standard. The International Alphabet of Sanskrit Transliteration (IAST) is not a standard (as no specification exists for it) but a convention developed in Europe for the transliteration of Sanskrit rather than the transcription of Brahmic scripts.

As a notable difference, both international standards, ISO 15919 and UNRSGN transliterate anusvara as ṁ, while ALA-LC and IAST use ṃ for it. However, ISO 15919 provides guidance towards disambiguating between various anusvara situations (such as labial versus dental nasalizations), which is described in the table below.

=== Comparison with UNRSGN and IAST ===
The table below shows the differences between ISO 15919, UNRSGN and IAST for Devanagari transliteration.

Devanagari	ISO 15919	UNRSGN	IAST	Comment
ए / े	ē	e	e	To distinguish between long and short 'e' in Dardic and Dravidian languages, 'e' now represents ऎ / ॆ (short). The use of ē is considered optional in ISO 15919, and using e for ए (long) is acceptable for languages that do not distinguish long and short e.
ओ / ो	ō	o	o	To distinguish between long and short 'o' in Dardic and Dravidian languages, 'o' now represents ऒ / ॊ (short). The use of ō is considered optional in ISO 15919, and using o for ओ (long) is acceptable for languages that do not distinguish long and short o.
ऋ / ृ	r̥	ṛ	ṛ	In ISO 15919, ṛ is used to represent ड़.
ॠ / ॄ	r̥̄	ṝ	ṝ	For consistency with r̥
ऌ / ॢ	l̥	l̤	ḷ	In ISO 15919, ḷ is used to represent ळ.
ॡ / ॣ	l̥̄	l̤̄	ḹ	For consistency with l̥
◌ं	ṁ	ṁ	ṃ	ISO 15919 has two options about anusvāra. (1) In the simplified nasalization option, an anusvāra is always transliterated as ṁ. (2) In the strict nasalization option, anusvāra before a class consonant is transliterated as the class nasal—ṅ before k, kh, g, gh, ṅ; ñ before c, ch, j, jh, ñ; ṇ before ṭ, ṭh, ḍ, ḍh, ṇ; n before t, th, d, dh, n; m before p, ph, b, bh, m. ṃ is sometimes used to specifically represent the Gurmukhi tippi ੰ.
◌ं	ṅ ñ ṇ n m	ṁ	ṃ	ISO 15919 has two options about anusvāra. (1) In the simplified nasalization option, an anusvāra is always transliterated as ṁ. (2) In the strict nasalization option, anusvāra before a class consonant is transliterated as the class nasal—ṅ before k, kh, g, gh, ṅ; ñ before c, ch, j, jh, ñ; ṇ before ṭ, ṭh, ḍ, ḍh, ṇ; n before t, th, d, dh, n; m before p, ph, b, bh, m. ṃ is sometimes used to specifically represent the Gurmukhi tippi ੰ.
◌ँ	m̐		m̐	Vowel nasalization is transliterated as a tilde above the transliterated vowel (over the second vowel in the case of a digraph such as aĩ, aũ), except in Sanskrit.

== Font support ==
Only certain fonts support all Latin Unicode characters for the transliteration of Indic scripts according to this standard. For example, Tahoma supports almost all the characters needed. Arial and Times New Roman font packages that come with Microsoft Office 2007 and later also support most Latin Extended Additional characters like ḍ, ḷ, ṛ, ṣ and ṭ.

There is no standard keyboard layout for ISO 15919 input but many systems provide a way to select Unicode characters visually. ISO/IEC 14755 refers to this as a screen-selection entry method.

== See also ==
- National Library at Kolkata romanisation
- International Alphabet of Sanskrit Transliteration (IAST)
