= Ṛ (Indic) =

Letter "Ṛ" in Indic scripts

Example glyphs
- Bengali–Assamese: ঋ
- Tibetan: རྀ
- Malayalam: ഋ
- Sinhala: ඍ
- Ashoka Brahmi: Ṛ
- Devanagari: ऋ

Cognates
- Hebrew: ר
- Greek: Ρ
- Latin: R
- Cyrillic: Р

Properties
- Phonemic representation: /ɻ̩/
- ISO 15919 transliteration: r̥ R̥
- IAST transliteration: ṛ Ṛ
- ISCII code point: DF (223)

Ṛ is a letter symbol of Indic abugidas. In modern Indic (Brahmic) scripts, Ṛ is derived from the early (Ashokan) Brahmi letter after having gone through the Gupta letter. It is used only in Sanskrit language and in direct (unmodified) loanwords from Sanskrit which constitute the so-called tatsama vocabulary of the modern Indic languages written by Brahmic scripts. (The sign is not used in Pali) The symbol represents what in Sanskrit was a syllabic r-sound, same as in words like krk in some Slavic languages (Czech, Croatian, Serbian and Slovak). This vocalic r has the function of a vowel in Sanskrit grammar. In modern Indic languages, this letter is pronounced by adding a vowel sound after the r, yielding /ri/ in Northern South Asia, and /ru/ (Marathi, Odia, and the Dravidian languages of South India). English adopts the Northern Indic pronunciation into its spellings of Sanskrit loanwords (e.g. Krishna).

As with all vowels in Brahmic scripts, there are two signs to represent this single phoneme: 1) a stand-alone, independent letter (used when Ṛ does not immediately follow a consonant), and 2) a vowel sign for modifying a base consonant letter. (Bare base consonants without a modifying vowel sign represent a consonant followed by an inherent "A" vowel). Both of the signs are transliterated as Ṛ in the ISO 15919 romanization standard for Indic languages, and as Ṛ in IAST. The latter is commonly used in texts where no confusion with an identically transliterated Hindi consonant can arise (i.e. those where only Sanskrit occurs).

== Āryabhaṭa numeration ==
Aryabhata used Devanagari letters for numbers, very similar to the Greek numerals, even after the invention of Indian numerals. The matra sign ृ was used to modify a consonant's value ×10^{6}, but the independent vowel letter ऋ did not have an inherent value by itself.

== Historic Ṛ ==
There are three different general early historic scripts - Brahmi and its variants, Kharoṣṭhī, and Tocharian, the so-called slanting Brahmi. Ṛ was not found in early Brahmi, and only appears in some of the less geometric styles of later Brahmi writing, such as the Gupta. Like all Brahmic scripts, Tocharian Ṛ has an accompanying vowel mark for modifying a base consonant. In Kharoṣṭhī, the only independent vowel letter is for the inherent A. All other independent vowels, including Ṛ are indicated with vowel marks added to the letter A.

=== Brahmi Ṛ ===
The Brahmi letter Ṛ is probably derived from the Aramaic Resh, and is thus related to the modern Latin R and Greek Rho. Several identifiable styles of writing the Brahmi Ṛ can be found, most associated with a specific set of inscriptions from an artifact or diverse records from an historic period. As the earliest and most geometric style of Brahmi, the letters found on the Edicts of Ashoka and other records from around that time are normally the reference form for Brahmi letters, but Ṛ is not found in those texts, so it is usually cited with a back-formed geometric style character similar to "X".

Brahmi Ṛ historic forms
Ashoka (3rd-1st c. BCE)	Girnar (~150 BCE)	Kushana (~150-250 CE)	Gujarat (~250 CE)	Gupta (~350 CE)
No examples				

=== Tocharian Ṛ ===
The Tocharian letter is derived from the Brahmi. Unlike some of the consonants, Tocharian vowels do not have a Fremdzeichen form.

Tocharian consonants with Ṛ vowel marks
Kr	Khr	Gr	Ghr	Cr	Chr	Jr	Jhr	Nyr	Ṭr	Ṭhr	Ḍr	Ḍhr	Ṇr
Tr	Thr	Dr	Dhr	Nr	Pr	Phr	Br	Bhr	Mr	Yr	Rr	Lr	Vr
Śr	Ṣr	Sr	Hr										

=== Kharoṣṭhī Ṛ ===
The Kharoṣṭhī letter Ṛ is indicated with the vowel mark. As an independent vowel, Ṛ is indicated by adding the vowel marks to the independent vowel letter A.

== Devanagari Ṛ ==
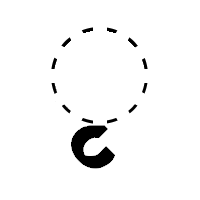
Devanagari independent Ṛ and Ṛ vowel sign.

Ṛ (ऋ) is a vowel of the Devanagari abugida. It arose from the Brahmi letter, after having gone through the Gupta letter. Letters that derive from it are the Gujarati letter ઋ, and the Modi letter 𑘆.

=== Devanagari Using Languages ===
The Devanagari script is used to write the Hindi language, Sanskrit and the majority of Indo-Aryan languages. In most of these languages, ऋ is pronounced as [ɾi]. Like all Indic scripts, Devanagari vowels come in two forms: an independent vowel form for syllables that begin with a vowel sound, and a vowel sign attached to base consonant to override the inherent /ə/ vowel.

== Bengali Ṛ ==
Bengali independent Ṛ and Ṛ vowel sign.

Ṛ (ঋ) is a vowel of the Bengali abugida. It is derived from the Siddhaṃ letter, and is marked by the lack of horizontal head line and less geometric shape than its Devanagari counterpart, ऋ.

=== Bengali Script Using Languages ===
The Bengali script is used to write several languages of eastern India, notably the Bengali language and Assamese. In most languages, ঋ is pronounced as [ṛ]. Like all Indic scripts, Bengali vowels come in two forms: an independent vowel form for syllables that begin with a vowel sound, and a vowel sign attached to base consonant to override the inherent /ɔ/ vowel.

== Gujarati Ṛ ==
Gujarati independent Ṛ and Ṛ vowel sign.

Ṛ (ઋ) is a vowel of the Gujarati abugida. It is derived from the Devanagari Ṛ, and the Brahmi letter.

=== Gujarati-using Languages ===
The Gujarati script is used to write the Gujarati and Kutchi languages. In both languages, ઋ is pronounced as Gujarati pronunciation: [ri]. Like all Indic scripts, Gujarati vowels come in two forms: an independent vowel form for syllables that begin with a vowel sound, and a vowel sign attached to base consonant to override the inherent /ə/ vowel.

== Telugu Ṛ ==
Telugu independent vowel and vowel sign Ṛ.

Ṛ (ఋ) is a vowel of the Telugu abugida. It arose from the Brahmi letter. It is closely related to the Kannada letter ಋ. Like in other Indic scripts, Telugu vowels have two forms: and independent letter for word and syllable-initial vowel sounds, and a vowel sign for changing the inherent "a" of Telugu consonant letters. Ṛ is a non-attaching vowel sign, and does not alter the underlying consonant or contextually shape itself in any way.

Telugu Ṛ vowel sign on క, ఖ, గ, ఘ & ఙ: KṚ, KhṚ, GṚ, GhṚ And NgṚ.

== Malayalam Ṛ ==
Malayalam independent vowel and vowel sign Ṛ.

Ṛ (ഋ) is a vowel of the Malayalam abugida. It arose from the Brahmi letter, via the Grantha letter r. Like in other Indic scripts, Malayalam vowels have two forms: an independent letter for word and syllable-initial vowel sounds, and a vowel sign for changing the inherent "a" of consonant letters. Vowel signs in Malayalam usually sit adjacent to its base consonant - below, to the left, right, or both left and right, but are always pronounced after the consonant sound. Some vowel signs, such as Ṛ, can also form a ligature with some consonants, although this is much more common in old-style paḻaya lipi texts than in the modern reformed paḻaya lipi orthography.

Malayalam Ṛ vowel sign on ക, ഖ, ഗ, ഘ, & ങ: KṚ, KhṚ, GṚ, GhṚ And NgṚ. in paḻaya lipi.

== Odia Ṛ ==
Odia independent and vowel sign Ṛ

Ṛ (ଋ) is a vowel of the Odia abugida. It arose from the Brahmi letter, via the Siddhaṃ letter r. Like in other Indic scripts, Odia vowels have two forms: an independent letter for word and syllable-initial vowel sounds, and a vowel sign for changing the inherent "a" of consonant letters. Vowel signs in Odia usually sit adjacent to its base consonant - below, to the left, right, or both left and right, but are always pronounced after the consonant sound. No base consonants are altered in form when adding a vowel sign, and there are no consonant+vowel ligatures in Odia.

== Tirhuta Ṛ ==
Tirhuta independent vowel and vowel sign Ṛ.

Ṛ (𑒇) is a vowel of the Tirhuta abugida. It ultimately arose from the Brahmi letter, via the Siddhaṃ letter r. Like in other Indic scripts, Tirhuta vowels have two forms: an independent letter for word and syllable-initial vowel sounds, and a vowel sign for changing the inherent "a" of consonant letters. Vowel signs in Tirhuta usually sit adjacent to its base consonant - below, to the left, right, or both left and right, but are always pronounced after the consonant sound. Several consonants are altered in form when adding the Ṛ vowel mark, unlike most Tirhuta vowels.

=== Conjuncts of 𑒇 ===
As is common in Indic scripts, Tirhuta joins letters together to form ligatures and conjuncts. Unlike most Indic scripts, Tirhuta not only has ligatures and conjuncts of consonant clusters, but also forms ligatures of consonants + vowel marks. Ṛ (𑒇) is one of the vowels that form ligatures with some consonants.

- 𑒦𑓂 (bʰ) + 𑒇 (ṛ) gives the ligature bʰṛ:

- 𑒯𑓂 (h) + 𑒇 (ṛ) gives the ligature hṛ:

- 𑒏𑓂 (k) + 𑒇 (ṛ) gives the ligature kṛ:

- 𑒞𑓂 (t) + 𑒇 (ṛ) gives the ligature tṛ:

== Comparison of Ṛ ==
The various Indic scripts are generally related to each other through adaptation and borrowing, and as such the glyphs for cognate letters, including Ṛ, are related as well.

Comparison of Ṛ (Ṛ) in different scripts

Aramaic
Kharoṣṭhī 𐨃	Ashoka Brahmi / 𑀾	Kushana Brahmi (Note: The middle "Kushana" form of Brahmi is a later style that emerged as Brahmi scripts were beginning to proliferate. Gupta Brahmi was definitely a stylistic descendant from Kushana, but other Brahmi-derived scripts may have descended from earlier forms.) / 𑀾	Tocharian (Note: Tocharian is probably derived from the middle period "Kushana" form of Brahmi, although artifacts from that time are not plentiful enough to establish a definite succession.) -
Gupta Brahmi / 𑀾	Pallava -
Kadamba -
Bhaiksuki 𑰆 / 𑰴	Siddhaṃ / 𑖴	Grantha 𑌋 / 𑍃	Cham -
Sinhala ඍ / ෘ	Pyu / Old Mon (Note: Pyu and Old Mon are probably the precursors of the Burmese script, and may be derived from either the Pallava or Kadamba script) -
Tibetan རྀ / ྲྀ	Newa 𑐆 / 𑐺	Ahom -	Malayalam ഋ / ൃ
Telugu ఋ / ృ	Burmese ၒ / ၖ
Lepcha -	Ranjana	Saurashtra ꢈ / ꢺ	Dives Akuru -
Kannada ಋ / ೃ	Kayah Li -
Limbu -	Soyombo (Note: May also be derived from Devangari (see bottom left of table)) -	Khmer ឫ	Tamil -
Chakma -	Tai Tham ᩂ
Meitei Mayek -	Gaudi -	Thai ฤ	Lao -
Tai Le -
Marchen -	Tirhuta 𑒇 / 𑒵	New Tai Lue -	Tai Viet -	Aksara Kawi 𑼊 / 𑼺
'Phags-pa -	Odia ଋ / ୃ	Sharada 𑆉 / 𑆸	Rejang -	Batak -	Buginese -
Zanabazar Square -	Bengali–Assamese ঋ / ৃ	Takri -	Javanese ꦉ / ꦽ	Balinese ᬋ / ᬺ	Makasar -
Hangul (Note: The Origin of Hangul from 'Phags-pa is one of limited influence, inspiring at most a few basic letter shapes. Hangul does not function as an Indic abugida.) -	Northern Nagari -	Dogri 𑠱	Laṇḍā -	Sundanese ᮻ	Baybayin -
Modi 𑘆 / 𑘵	Gujarati ઋ / ૃ	Khojki -	Khudabadi -	Mahajani -	Tagbanwa -
Devanagari ऋ / ृ	Nandinagari 𑦦 / 𑧖	Kaithi -	Gurmukhi -	Multani -	Buhid -
Canadian Syllabics (Note: Although the basic letter forms of the Canadian Aboriginal Syllabics were derived from handwritten Devanagari letters, this abugida indicates vowel sounds by rotations of the letter form, rather than the use of vowel diacritics as is standard in Indic abugidas.) -	Soyombo (Note: May also be derived from Ranjana (see above)) -	Sylheti Nagari -	Gunjala Gondi -	Masaram Gondi (Note: Masaram Gondi acts as an Indic abugida, but its letterforms were not derived from any single precursor script.) 𑴶	Hanuno'o -

== Character encodings of Ṛ ==
Most Indic scripts are encoded in the Unicode Standard, and as such the letter Ṛ in those scripts can be represented in plain text with unique codepoint. Ṛ from several modern-use scripts can also be found in legacy encodings, such as ISCII.

Character information
Preview	ऋ		ঋ		ఋ		ଋ		ಋ		ഋ		ઋ	
Unicode name	DEVANAGARI LETTER VOCALIC R		BENGALI LETTER VOCALIC R		TELUGU LETTER VOCALIC R		ORIYA LETTER VOCALIC R		KANNADA LETTER VOCALIC R		MALAYALAM LETTER VOCALIC R		GUJARATI LETTER VOCALIC R	
Encodings	decimal	hex	dec	hex	dec	hex	dec	hex	dec	hex	dec	hex	dec	hex
Unicode	2315	U+090B	2443	U+098B	3083	U+0C0B	2827	U+0B0B	3211	U+0C8B	3339	U+0D0B	2699	U+0A8B
UTF-8	224 164 139	E0 A4 8B	224 166 139	E0 A6 8B	224 176 139	E0 B0 8B	224 172 139	E0 AC 8B	224 178 139	E0 B2 8B	224 180 139	E0 B4 8B	224 170 139	E0 AA 8B
Numeric character reference	&#2315;	&#x90B;	&#2443;	&#x98B;	&#3083;	&#xC0B;	&#2827;	&#xB0B;	&#3211;	&#xC8B;	&#3339;	&#xD0B;	&#2699;	&#xA8B;
ISCII	223	DF	223	DF	223	DF	223	DF	223	DF	223	DF	223	DF

Character information
Preview	Ashoka Kushana Gupta				𑌋	
Unicode name	BRAHMI LETTER VOCALIC R		SIDDHAM LETTER VOCALIC R		GRANTHA LETTER VOCALIC R	
Encodings	decimal	hex	dec	hex	dec	hex
Unicode	69643	U+1100B	71046	U+11586	70411	U+1130B
UTF-8	240 145 128 139	F0 91 80 8B	240 145 150 134	F0 91 96 86	240 145 140 139	F0 91 8C 8B
UTF-16	55300 56331	D804 DC0B	55301 56710	D805 DD86	55300 57099	D804 DF0B
Numeric character reference	&#69643;	&#x1100B;	&#71046;	&#x11586;	&#70411;	&#x1130B;

Character information
Preview	𑐆		𑰆		𑆉	
Unicode name	NEWA LETTER VOCALIC R		BHAIKSUKI LETTER VOCALIC R		SHARADA LETTER VOCALIC R	
Encodings	decimal	hex	dec	hex	dec	hex
Unicode	70662	U+11406	72710	U+11C06	70025	U+11189
UTF-8	240 145 144 134	F0 91 90 86	240 145 176 134	F0 91 B0 86	240 145 134 137	F0 91 86 89
UTF-16	55301 56326	D805 DC06	55303 56326	D807 DC06	55300 56713	D804 DD89
Numeric character reference	&#70662;	&#x11406;	&#72710;	&#x11C06;	&#70025;	&#x11189;

Character information
Preview	ၒ	
Unicode name	MYANMAR LETTER VOCALIC R	
Encodings	decimal	hex
Unicode	4178	U+1052
UTF-8	225 129 146	E1 81 92
Numeric character reference	&#4178;	&#x1052;

Character information
Preview	ឫ	
Unicode name	KHMER INDEPENDENT VOWEL RY	
Encodings	decimal	hex
Unicode	6059	U+17AB
UTF-8	225 158 171	E1 9E AB
Numeric character reference	&#6059;	&#x17AB;

Character information
Preview	ඍ		ꢈ	
Unicode name	SINHALA LETTER IRUYANNA		SAURASHTRA LETTER VOCALIC R	
Encodings	decimal	hex	dec	hex
Unicode	3469	U+0D8D	43144	U+A888
UTF-8	224 182 141	E0 B6 8D	234 162 136	EA A2 88
Numeric character reference	&#3469;	&#xD8D;	&#43144;	&#xA888;

Character information
Preview	𑘆		𑦦	
Unicode name	MODI LETTER VOCALIC R		NANDINAGARI LETTER VOCALIC R	
Encodings	decimal	hex	dec	hex
Unicode	71174	U+11606	72102	U+119A6
UTF-8	240 145 152 134	F0 91 98 86	240 145 166 166	F0 91 A6 A6
UTF-16	55301 56838	D805 DE06	55302 56742	D806 DDA6
Numeric character reference	&#71174;	&#x11606;	&#72102;	&#x119A6;

Character information
Preview	𑒇	
Unicode name	TIRHUTA LETTER VOCALIC R	
Encodings	decimal	hex
Unicode	70791	U+11487
UTF-8	240 145 146 135	F0 91 92 87
UTF-16	55301 56455	D805 DC87
Numeric character reference	&#70791;	&#x11487;

Character information
Preview	𑠱	
Unicode name	DOGRA VOWEL SIGN VOCALIC R	
Encodings	decimal	hex
Unicode	71729	U+11831
UTF-8	240 145 160 177	F0 91 A0 B1
UTF-16	55302 56369	D806 DC31
Numeric character reference	&#71729;	&#x11831;

Character information
Preview	ᬋ		ᮻ	
Unicode name	BALINESE LETTER RA REPA		SUNDANESE LETTER REU	
Encodings	decimal	hex	dec	hex
Unicode	6923	U+1B0B	7099	U+1BBB
UTF-8	225 172 139	E1 AC 8B	225 174 187	E1 AE BB
Numeric character reference	&#6923;	&#x1B0B;	&#7099;	&#x1BBB;
