= Ḷ (Indic) =

Letter "Ḷ" in Indic scripts

Example glyphs
- Bengali–Assamese: ঌ
- Tibetan: ལྀ
- Malayalam: ഌ
- Sinhala: ඏ
- Ashoka Brahmi: Ḷ
- Devanagari: ऌ

Cognates
- Hebrew: ל
- Greek: Λ
- Latin: L, Ł, Ɬ
- Cyrillic: Л, Љ, Ԓ, Ӆ

Properties
- Phonemic representation: /l̩/
- ISO 15919 transliteration: l̥ L̥
- IAST transliteration: ḷ Ḷ
- ISCII code point: 00 (0)

Ḷ or Vocalic L is a vowel symbol of Indic abugidas. In modern Indic scripts, Ḷ is derived from the Brahmi letter. As an Indic vowel, Ḷ comes in two normally distinct forms: 1) as an independent letter, and 2) as a sign for modifying a base consonant. Bare consonants without a modifying vowel sign have the inherent "A" vowel.

== Āryabhaṭa numeration ==
Aryabhata used Devanagari letters for numbers, very similar to the Greek numerals, even after the invention of Indian numerals. The ॢ sign was used to modify a consonant's value ×10^{8}, but the vowel letter ऌ did not have an inherent value by itself.

== Historic Ḷ ==
There are three different general early historic scripts - Brahmi and its variants, Kharoṣṭhī, and Tocharian, the so-called slanting Brahmi. Ḷ as found in Brahmi was missing in earlier geometric styles, but emerged as a vowel mark during more flowing styles of Brahmi, such as the Kushana and Gupta. In both Tocharian and Kharoṣṭhī, Ḷ is not currently known from any source materials.

=== Brahmi Ḷ ===
The Brahmi letter Ḷ is only found as a vowel mark, and is derived from the consonant La, and therefore is probably from the Aramaic Lamed. This would make it related to the modern Latin L and Greek Lambda. Several identifiable styles of writing the Brahmi Ḷ can be found, most associated with a specific set of inscriptions from an artifact or diverse records from an historic period. As the earliest and most geometric style of Brahmi, the letters found on the Edicts of Ashoka and other records from around that time are normally the reference form for Brahmi letters, but Ḷ must be back-formed from later forms to match the reference geometric writing style, and the reference image for the independent letter is just the vowel mark enlarged to the size of a full letter.

== Devanagari Ḷ ==
Devanagari independent Ḷ and Ḷ vowel sign.

Ḷ (ऌ) is a vowel of the Devanagari abugida. It ultimately arose from the Brahmi letter, via Gupta. Letters that derive from it are the Gujarati letter ઌ, and the Modi letter 𑘈.

=== Devanagari-script languages ===
The Devanagari script is used to write the Hindi language, Sanskrit and the majority of Indo-Aryan languages. In most of these languages, ऌ is pronounced as [ḷ]. Like all Indic scripts, Devanagari vowels come in two forms: an independent vowel form for syllables that begin with a vowel sound, and a vowel sign attached to base consonant to override the inherent /ə/ vowel.

== Bengali–Assamese Ḷ ==
Bengali–Assamese independent Ḷ and Ḷ vowel sign.

Ḷ (ঌ) is a vowel of the Bengali–Assamese abugida. It is derived from the Siddhaṃ letter, and is marked by the lack of horizontal head line and less geometric shape than its Devanagari counterpart, ऌ.

=== Bengali–Assamese-script languages ===
The Bengali–Assamese script is used to write several languages of eastern India, notably the Bengali language and Assamese. In most languages, ঌ is pronounced as [ḷ]. Like all Indic scripts, Bengali–Assamese vowels come in two forms: an independent vowel form for syllables that begin with a vowel sound, and a vowel sign attached to base consonant to override the inherent /ɔ/ vowel.

== Gujarati Ḷ ==
Gujarati independent Ḷ and Ḷ vowel sign.

Ḷ (ઌ) is a vowel of the Gujarati abugida. It is derived from the Devanagari Ḷ, and ultimately the Brahmi letter.

=== Gujarati-script languages ===
The Gujarati script is used to write the Gujarati and Kutchi languages. In both languages, ઌ is pronounced as [ḷ]. Like all Indic scripts, Gujarati vowels come in two forms: an independent vowel form for syllables that begin with a vowel sound, and a vowel sign attached to base consonant to override the inherent /ə/ vowel.

== Telugu Ḷ ==
Telugu independent vowel and vowel sign Ḷ.

Ḷ (ఌ) is a vowel of the Telugu abugida. It ultimately arose from the Brahmi letter. It is closely related to the Kannada letter ಌ. Like in other Indic scripts, Telugu vowels have two forms: and independent letter for word and syllable-initial vowel sounds, and a vowel sign for changing the inherent "a" of Telugu consonant letters. Ḷ is a non-attaching vowel sign, and does not alter the underlying consonant or contextually shape itself in any way.

Telugu Ḷ vowel sign on క, ఖ, గ, ఘ & ఙ: Kḷ, Khḷ, Gḷ, Ghḷ and Ngḷ.

== Malayalam Ḷ ==
Malayalam independent vowel and vowel sign Ḷ.

Ḷ (ഌ) is a vowel of the Malayalam abugida. It ultimately arose from the Brahmi letter, via the Grantha letter ḷ. Like in other Indic scripts, Malayalam vowels have two forms: an independent letter for word and syllable-initial vowel sounds, and a vowel sign for changing the inherent "a" of consonant letters. Vowel signs in Malayalam usually sit adjacent to its base consonant - below, to the left, right, or both left and right, but are always pronounced after the consonant sound.

== Odia Ḷ ==
Odia independent vowel and vowel sign Ḷ.

Ḷ (ଌ) is a vowel of the Odia abugida. It ultimately arose from the Brahmi letter, via the Siddhaṃ letter ḷ. Like in other Indic scripts, Odia vowels have two forms: an independent letter for word and syllable-initial vowel sounds, and a vowel sign for changing the inherent "a" of consonant letters. Vowel signs in Odia usually sit adjacent to its base consonant - below, to the left, right, or both left and right, but are always pronounced after the consonant sound. No base consonants are altered in form when adding a vowel sign, and there are no consonant+vowel ligatures in Odia.

== Tirhuta Ḷ ==
Tirhuta independent vowel and vowel sign Ḷ.

Ḷ (𑒉) is a vowel of the Tirhuta abugida. It ultimately arose from the Brahmi letter, via the Siddhaṃ letter l. Like in other Indic scripts, Tirhuta vowels have two forms: an independent letter for word and syllable-initial vowel sounds, and a vowel sign for changing the inherent "a" of consonant letters. Vowel signs in Tirhuta usually sit adjacent to its base consonant - below, to the left, right, or both left and right, but are always pronounced after the consonant sound. No consonants are altered in form when adding the Ḷ vowel mark, although there are some consonant+vowel ligatures in Tirhuta.

== Comparison of Ḷ ==
The various Indic scripts are generally related to each other through adaptation and borrowing, and as such the glyphs for cognate letters, including Ḷ, are related as well.

Comparison of Ḷ in different scripts

Aramaic
Kharoṣṭhī -	Ashoka Brahmi / 𑁀	Kushana Brahmi (Note: The middle "Kushana" form of Brahmi is a later style that emerged as Brahmi scripts were beginning to proliferate. Gupta Brahmi was definitely a stylistic descendant from Kushana, but other Brahmi-derived scripts may have descended from earlier forms.) 𑀍 / 𑁀	Tocharian (Note: Tocharian is probably derived from the middle period "Kushana" form of Brahmi, although artifacts from that time are not plentiful enough to establish a definite succession.) -
Gupta Brahmi 𑀍 / 𑁀	Pallava -
Kadamba -
Bhaiksuki 𑰈 / 𑰶	Siddhaṃ	Grantha 𑌌 / 𑍢	Cham -
Sinhala ඏ / ෟ	Pyu / Old Mon (Note: Pyu and Old Mon are probably the precursors of the Burmese script, and may be derived from either the Pallava or Kadamba script) -
Tibetan ལྀ / ླྀ	Newa 𑐈 / 𑐼	Ahom -	Malayalam ഌ / ൢ
Telugu ఌ / ౢ	Burmese ၔ / ၘ
Lepcha -	Ranjana	Saurashtra ꢊ / ꢼ	Dives Akuru -
Kannada ಌ / ೢ	Kayah Li -
Limbu -	Soyombo (Note: May also be derived from Devangari (see bottom left of table)) 𑩚	Khmer ឭ	Tamil -
Chakma -	Tai Tham ᩄ
Meitei Mayek -	Gaudi -	Thai ฦ	Lao -
Tai Le -
Marchen -	Tirhuta 𑒉 / 𑒷	New Tai Lue -	Tai Viet -	Aksara Kawi 𑼌
'Phags-pa -	Odia ଌ / ୢ	Sharada 𑆋 / 𑆺	Rejang -	Batak -	Buginese -
Zanabazar Square -	Bengali–Assamese ঌ / ৢ	Takri -	Javanese ꦊ	Balinese ᬍ / ᬼ	Makasar -
Hangul (Note: The Origin of Hangul from 'Phags-pa is one of limited influence, inspiring at most a few basic letter shapes. Hangul does not function as an Indic abugida.) -	Northern Nagari -	Dogri -	Laṇḍā -	Sundanese ᮼ	Baybayin -
Modi 𑘈 / 𑘷	Gujarati ઌ / ૢ	Khojki -	Khudabadi -	Mahajani -	Tagbanwa -
Devanagari ऌ / ॢ	Nandinagari -	Kaithi -	Gurmukhi -	Multani -	Buhid -
Canadian Syllabics (Note: Although the basic letter forms of the Canadian Aboriginal Syllabics were derived from handwritten Devanagari letters, this abugida indicates vowel sounds by rotations of the letter form, rather than the use of vowel diacritics as is standard in Indic abugidas.) -	Soyombo (Note: May also be derived from Ranjana (see above)) 𑩚	Sylheti Nagari -	Gunjala Gondi -	Masaram Gondi (Note: Masaram Gondi acts as an Indic abugida, but its letterforms were not derived from any single precursor script.) -	Hanuno'o -

== Character encodings of Ḷ ==
Most Indic scripts are encoded in the Unicode Standard, and as such the letter Ḷ in those scripts can be represented in plain text with unique codepoint. Ḷ from several modern-use scripts can also be found in legacy encodings, such as ISCII.

Character information
Preview	ऌ		ঌ		ఌ		ଌ		ಌ		ഌ		ઌ	
Unicode name	DEVANAGARI LETTER VOCALIC L		BENGALI LETTER VOCALIC L		TELUGU LETTER VOCALIC L		ORIYA LETTER VOCALIC L		KANNADA LETTER VOCALIC L		MALAYALAM LETTER VOCALIC L		GUJARATI LETTER VOCALIC L	
Encodings	decimal	hex	dec	hex	dec	hex	dec	hex	dec	hex	dec	hex	dec	hex
Unicode	2316	U+090C	2444	U+098C	3084	U+0C0C	2828	U+0B0C	3212	U+0C8C	3340	U+0D0C	2700	U+0A8C
UTF-8	224 164 140	E0 A4 8C	224 166 140	E0 A6 8C	224 176 140	E0 B0 8C	224 172 140	E0 AC 8C	224 178 140	E0 B2 8C	224 180 140	E0 B4 8C	224 170 140	E0 AA 8C
Numeric character reference	&#2316;	&#x90C;	&#2444;	&#x98C;	&#3084;	&#xC0C;	&#2828;	&#xB0C;	&#3212;	&#xC8C;	&#3340;	&#xD0C;	&#2700;	&#xA8C;
ISCII														

Character information
Preview	Ashoka Kushana Gupta		𑖈		𑌌	
Unicode name	BRAHMI LETTER VOCALIC L		SIDDHAM LETTER VOCALIC L		GRANTHA LETTER VOCALIC L	
Encodings	decimal	hex	dec	hex	dec	hex
Unicode	69645	U+1100D	71048	U+11588	70412	U+1130C
UTF-8	240 145 128 141	F0 91 80 8D	240 145 150 136	F0 91 96 88	240 145 140 140	F0 91 8C 8C
UTF-16	55300 56333	D804 DC0D	55301 56712	D805 DD88	55300 57100	D804 DF0C
Numeric character reference	&#69645;	&#x1100D;	&#71048;	&#x11588;	&#70412;	&#x1130C;

Character information
Preview	𑐈		𑰈		𑆋	
Unicode name	NEWA LETTER VOCALIC L		BHAIKSUKI LETTER VOCALIC L		SHARADA LETTER VOCALIC L	
Encodings	decimal	hex	dec	hex	dec	hex
Unicode	70664	U+11408	72712	U+11C08	70027	U+1118B
UTF-8	240 145 144 136	F0 91 90 88	240 145 176 136	F0 91 B0 88	240 145 134 139	F0 91 86 8B
UTF-16	55301 56328	D805 DC08	55303 56328	D807 DC08	55300 56715	D804 DD8B
Numeric character reference	&#70664;	&#x11408;	&#72712;	&#x11C08;	&#70027;	&#x1118B;

Character information
Preview	ၔ	
Unicode name	MYANMAR LETTER VOCALIC L	
Encodings	decimal	hex
Unicode	4180	U+1054
UTF-8	225 129 148	E1 81 94
Numeric character reference	&#4180;	&#x1054;

Character information
Preview	ឭ	
Unicode name	KHMER INDEPENDENT VOWEL LY	
Encodings	decimal	hex
Unicode	6061	U+17AD
UTF-8	225 158 173	E1 9E AD
Numeric character reference	&#6061;	&#x17AD;

Character information
Preview	ඏ		ꢊ	
Unicode name	SINHALA LETTER ILUYANNA		SAURASHTRA LETTER VOCALIC L	
Encodings	decimal	hex	dec	hex
Unicode	3471	U+0D8F	43146	U+A88A
UTF-8	224 182 143	E0 B6 8F	234 162 138	EA A2 8A
Numeric character reference	&#3471;	&#xD8F;	&#43146;	&#xA88A;

Character information
Preview	𑘈	
Unicode name	MODI LETTER VOCALIC L	
Encodings	decimal	hex
Unicode	71176	U+11608
UTF-8	240 145 152 136	F0 91 98 88
UTF-16	55301 56840	D805 DE08
Numeric character reference	&#71176;	&#x11608;

Character information
Preview	𑒉	
Unicode name	TIRHUTA LETTER VOCALIC L	
Encodings	decimal	hex
Unicode	70793	U+11489
UTF-8	240 145 146 137	F0 91 92 89
UTF-16	55301 56457	D805 DC89
Numeric character reference	&#70793;	&#x11489;

Character information
Preview	ᬍ		ꦊ		ᮼ	
Unicode name	BALINESE LETTER LA LENGA		JAVANESE LETTER NGA LELET		SUNDANESE LETTER LEU	
Encodings	decimal	hex	dec	hex	dec	hex
Unicode	6925	U+1B0D	43402	U+A98A	7100	U+1BBC
UTF-8	225 172 141	E1 AC 8D	234 166 138	EA A6 8A	225 174 188	E1 AE BC
Numeric character reference	&#6925;	&#x1B0D;	&#43402;	&#xA98A;	&#7100;	&#x1BBC;
