= Mac OS Gujarati =

Apple computer text character encoding

- Alias(es): x-mac-gujarati
- Created by: Apple, Inc
- Classification: Extended ASCII, Mac OS script
- Extends: US-ASCII
- Based on: ISCII

Mac OS Gujarati is a character set developed by Apple Inc. It is an extension of the Gujarati portion of IS 13194:1991 (ISCII-91).

== Code page layout ==
The following table shows the Mac OS Gujarati encoding. Each character is shown with its equivalent Unicode code point. Only the second half of the table (code points 128–255) is shown, the first half (code points 0–127) being the same as Mac OS Roman.

Mac OS Gujarati
	0	1	2	3	4	5	6	7	8	9	A	B	C	D	E	F
8x	×	−	–	—	‘	’	…	•	©	®	™					
9x	॥															
Ax		ઁ	ં	ઃ	અ	આ	ઇ	ઈ	ઉ	ઊ	ઋ		એ	ઐ	ઍ	
Bx	ઓ	ઔ	ઑ	ક	ખ	ગ	ઘ	ઙ	ચ	છ	જ	ઝ	ઞ	ટ	ઠ	ડ
Cx	ઢ	ણ	ત	થ	દ	ધ	ન		પ	ફ	બ	ભ	મ	ય		ર
Dx		લ	ળ		વ	શ	ષ	સ	હ	LRM	ા	િ	ી	ુ	ૂ	ૃ
Ex		ે	ૈ	ૅ		ો	ૌ	ૉ	્	઼	।					
Fx		૦	૧	૨	૩	૪	૫	૬	૭	૮	૯					

Byte pairs and ISCII-related features are described in the mapping file.
