= La (Indic) =

Letter "La" in Indic scripts

Example glyphs
- Bengali–Assamese: La
- Tibetan: La
- Tamil: La
- Thai: ล
- Malayalam: ല
- Sinhala: ල
- Ashoka Brahmi: La
- Devanagari: La

Cognates
- Hebrew: ל
- Greek: Λ
- Latin: L, Ł, Ɬ
- Cyrillic: Л, Љ, Ԓ, Ӆ

Properties
- Phonemic representation: /l/
- IAST transliteration: l L
- ISCII code point: D1 (209)

La is a consonant of Indic abugidas. In modern Indic scripts, La is derived from the early "Ashoka" Brahmi letter after having gone through the Gupta letter.

== Āryabhaṭa numeration ==
Aryabhata used Devanagari letters for numbers, very similar to the Greek numerals, even after the invention of Indian numerals. The values of the different forms of ल are:

- ल [lə] = 50 (५०)
- लि [lɪ] = 5,000 (५ ०००)
- लु [lʊ] = 500,000 (५ ०० ०००)
- लृ [lri] = 50,000,000 (५ ०० ०० ०००)
- लॢ [llə] = 5×10^{9} (५×१०^{९})
- ले [le] = 5×10^{11} (५×१०^{११})
- लै [lɛː] = 5×10^{13} (५×१०^{१३})
- लो [loː] = 5×10^{15} (५×१०^{१५})
- लौ [lɔː] = 5×10^{17} (५×१०^{१७})

== Historic La ==
There are three different general early historic scripts - Brahmi and its variants, Kharoṣṭhī, and Tocharian, the so-called slanting Brahmi. La as found in standard Brahmi, was a simple geometric shape, with variations toward more flowing forms by the Gupta. The Tocharian La had an alternate Fremdzeichen form,. The third form of la, in Kharoshthi was probably derived from Aramaic separately from the Brahmi letter.

=== Brahmi La ===
The Brahmi letter, La, is probably derived from the Aramaic Lamed, and is thus related to the modern Latin L and Greek Lambda. Several identifiable styles of writing the Brahmi La can be found, most associated with a specific set of inscriptions from an artifact or diverse records from an historic period. As the earliest and most geometric style of Brahmi, the letters found on the Edicts of Ashoka and other records from around that time are normally the reference form for Brahmi letters, with vowel marks not attested until later forms of Brahmi back-formed to match the geometric writing style.

Brahmi La historic forms
Ashoka (3rd-1st c. BCE)	Girnar (~150 BCE)	Kushana (~150-250 CE)	Gujarat (~250 CE)	Gupta (~350 CE)

=== Tocharian La ===
The Tocharian letter is derived from the Brahmi, and has an alternate Fremdzeichen form used in conjuncts and as an alternate representation of Lä.

Tocharian La with vowel marks
La	Lā	Li	Lī	Lu	Lū	Lr	Lr̄	Le	Lai	Lo	Lau	Lä	Fremdzeichen

=== Kharoṣṭhī La ===
The Kharoṣṭhī letter is generally accepted as being derived from the Aramaic Lamed, and is thus related to L and Lambda, in addition to the Brahmi La.

== Devanagari La ==
La (ल) is a consonant of the Devanagari abugida. It ultimately arose from the Brahmi letter, after having gone through the Gupta letter. Letters that derive from it are the Gujarati letter લ, and the Modi letter 𑘩. The modern letterform for Devanagari La is slightly different than the historic form, with the vertical stem reaching to the lower baseline.

Forms of Devanagari La
Modern Devanagari La

Historic Devanagari La

=== Devanagari-using Languages ===
In all languages, ल is pronounced as [lə] or [l] when appropriate. Like all Indic scripts, Devanagari uses vowel marks attached to the base consonant to override the inherent /ə/ vowel:

Devanagari ल with vowel marks
La	Lā	Li	Lī	Lu	Lū	Lr	Lr̄	Ll	Ll̄	Le	Lai	Lo	Lau	L
ल	ला	लि	ली	लु	लू	लृ	लॄ	लॢ	लॣ	ले	लै	लो	लौ	ल्

=== Conjuncts with ल ===
Half form of La.

Devanagari exhibits conjunct ligatures, as is common in Indic scripts. In modern Devanagari texts, most conjuncts are formed by reducing the letter shape to fit tightly to the following letter, usually by dropping a character's vertical stem, sometimes referred to as a "half form". Some conjunct clusters are always represented by a true ligature, instead of a shape that can be broken into constituent independent letters. Vertically stacked conjuncts are ubiquitous in older texts, while only a few are still used routinely in modern Devanagari texts. The use of ligatures and vertical conjuncts may vary across languages using the Devanagari script, with Marathi in particular preferring the use of half forms where texts in other languages would show ligatures and vertical stacks.

==== Ligature conjuncts of ल ====
True ligatures are quite rare in Indic scripts. The most common ligated conjuncts in Devanagari are in the form of a slight mutation to fit in context or as a consistent variant form appended to the adjacent characters. Those variants include Na and the Repha and Rakar forms of Ra. Nepali and Marathi texts use the "eyelash" Ra half form for an initial "R" instead of repha.

- Repha र্ (r) + ल (la) gives the ligature rla: ^{note}

- Eyelash र্ (r) + ल (la) gives the ligature rla:

- ल্ (l) + न (na) gives the ligature lna:

- ल্ (l) + rakar र (ra) gives the ligature lra:

==== Stacked conjuncts of ल ====
Vertically stacked ligatures are the most common conjunct forms found in Devanagari text. Although the constituent characters may need to be stretched and moved slightly in order to stack neatly, stacked conjuncts can be broken down into recognizable base letters, or a letter and an otherwise standard ligature.

- भ্ (bʰ) + ल (la) gives the ligature bʰla:

- ब্ (b) + ल (la) gives the ligature bla:

- छ্ (cʰ) + ल (la) gives the ligature cʰla:

- च্ (c) + ल (la) gives the ligature cla:

- ढ্ (ḍʱ) + ल (la) gives the ligature ḍʱla:

- ड্ (ḍ) + ल (la) gives the ligature ḍla:

- ध্ (dʱ) + ल (la) gives the ligature dʱla:

- द্ (d) + ल (la) gives the ligature dla:

- घ্ (ɡʱ) + ल (la) gives the ligature ɡʱla:

- ग্ (g) + ल (la) gives the ligature gla:

- ह্ (h) + ल (la) gives the ligature hla:

- झ্ (jʰ) + ल (la) gives the ligature jʰla:

- ज্ (j) + ल (la) gives the ligature jla:

- ख্ (kʰ) + ल (la) gives the ligature kʰla:

- क্ (k) + ल (la) gives the ligature kla:

- ल্ (l) + ब (ba) gives the ligature lba:

- ल্ (l) + च (ca) gives the ligature lca:

- ल্ (l) + ज (ja) gives the ligature lja:

- ल্ (l) + ज্ (j) + ञ (ña) gives the ligature ljña:

- ल্ (l) + ल (la) gives the ligature lla:

- ल্ (l) + ळ (ḻa) gives the ligature lḻa:

- ळ্ (ḻ) + ल (la) gives the ligature ḻla:

- ल্ (l) + ञ (ña) gives the ligature lña:

- ल্ (l) + व (va) gives the ligature lva:

- म্ (m) + ल (la) gives the ligature mla:

- ङ্ (ŋ) + ल (la) gives the ligature ŋla:

- न্ (n) + ल (la) gives the ligature nla:

- ण্ (ṇ) + ल (la) gives the ligature ṇla:

- ञ্ (ñ) + ल (la) gives the ligature ñla:

- फ্ (pʰ) + ल (la) gives the ligature pʰla:

- प্ (p) + ल (la) gives the ligature pla:

- श্ (ʃ) + ल (la) gives the ligature ʃla:

- स্ (s) + ल (la) gives the ligature sla:

- ष্ (ṣ) + ल (la) gives the ligature ṣla:

- थ্ (tʰ) + ल (la) gives the ligature tʰla:

- त্ (t) + ल (la) gives the ligature tla:

- ठ্ (ṭʰ) + ल (la) gives the ligature ṭʰla:

- ट্ (ṭ) + ल (la) gives the ligature ṭla:

- व্ (v) + ल (la) gives the ligature vla:

- य্ (y) + ल (la) gives the ligature yla:

• Note that the conjuncts shown here come from a typeface used for representing older Vedic texts, and use the older form of La for many conjuncts.

== Bengali La ==
The Bengali script ল is derived from the Siddhaṃ, and is marked by a similar horizontal head line, but less geometric shape, than its Devanagari counterpart, ल. The inherent vowel of Bengali consonant letters is /ɔ/, so the bare letter ল will sometimes be transliterated as "lo" instead of "la". Adding okar, the "o" vowel mark, gives a reading of /lo/. Like all Indic consonants, ল can be modified by marks to indicate another (or no) vowel than its inherent "a".

Bengali ল with vowel marks
la	lā	li	lī	lu	lū	lr	lr̄	le	lai	lo	lau	l
ল	লা	লি	লী	লু	লূ	লৃ	লৄ	লে	লৈ	লো	লৌ	ল্

=== ল in Bengali-using languages ===
ল is used as a basic consonant character in all of the major Bengali script orthographies, including Bengali and Assamese.

=== Conjuncts with ল ===
Bengali ল exhibits conjunct ligatures, as is common in Indic scripts, with a tendency towards stacked ligatures.

- ব্ (b) + ল (la) gives the ligature bla:

- গ্ (g) + ল (la) gives the ligature gla:

- ক্ (k) + ল (la) gives the ligature kla:

- ল্ (l) + ভ (bʰa) gives the ligature lbʰa:

- ল্ (l) + ড (ḍa) gives the ligature lḍa:

- ল্ (l) + গ (ga) gives the ligature lga:

- ল্ (l) + ক (ka) gives the ligature lka:

- ল্ (l) + ক্ (k) + য (ya) gives the ligature lkya, with the ya phala suffix:

- ল্ (l) + ল (la) gives the ligature lla:

- ল্ (l) + ম (ma) gives the ligature lma:

- ল্ (l) + প (pa) gives the ligature lpa:

- ল্ (l) + ফ (pʰa) gives the ligature lpʰa:

- ল্ (l) + ট (ṭa) gives the ligature lṭa:

- ল্ (l) + ব (va) gives the ligature lva, with the va phala suffix:

- ল্ (l) + য (ya) gives the ligature lya, with the ya phala suffix:

- ম্ (m) + ল (la) gives the ligature mla:

- ফ্ (pʰ) + ল (la) gives the ligature pʰla:

- প্ (p) + ল (la) gives the ligature pla:

- র্ (r) + ল (la) gives the ligature rla, with the repha prefix:

- শ্ (ʃ) + ল (la) gives the ligature ʃla:

- স্ (s) + ল (la) gives the ligature sla:

- স্ (s) + প্ (p) + ল (la) gives the ligature spla:

== Gujarati La ==
Gujarati La.

La (લ) is the twenty-eighth consonant of the Gujarati abugida. It is derived from the Devanagari La with the top bar (shiro rekha) removed, and ultimately the Brahmi letter.

=== Gujarati-using Languages ===
The Gujarati script is used to write the Gujarati and Kutchi languages. In both languages, લ is pronounced as [lə] or [l] when appropriate. Like all Indic scripts, Gujarati uses vowel marks attached to the base consonant to override the inherent /ə/ vowel:

La	Lā	Li	Lī	Lu	Lū	Lr	Ll	Lr̄	Ll̄	Lĕ	Le	Lai	Lŏ	Lo	Lau	L
Gujarati La syllables, with vowel marks in red.

=== Conjuncts with લ ===
Half form of La.

Gujarati લ exhibits conjunct ligatures, much like its parent Devanagari Script. Most Gujarati conjuncts can only be formed by reducing the letter shape to fit tightly to the following letter, usually by dropping a character's vertical stem, sometimes referred to as a "half form". A few conjunct clusters can be represented by a true ligature, instead of a shape that can be broken into constituent independent letters, and vertically stacked conjuncts can also be found in Gujarati, although much less commonly than in Devanagari. True ligatures are quite rare in Indic scripts. The most common ligated conjuncts in Gujarati are in the form of a slight mutation to fit in context or as a consistent variant form appended to the adjacent characters. Those variants include Na and the Repha and Rakar forms of Ra.

- ર્ (r) + લ (la) gives the ligature RLa:

- લ્ (l) + ર (ra) gives the ligature LRa:

- લ્ (l) + ન (na) gives the ligature LNa:

- શ્ (ʃ) + લ (la) gives the ligature ŚLa:

- હ્ (h) + લ (la) gives the ligature HLa:

== Telugu La ==
Telugu independent and subjoined La.

La (ల) is a consonant of the Telugu abugida. It ultimately arose from the Brahmi letter. It is closely related to the Kannada letter ಲ. Since it lacks the v-shaped headstroke common to most Telugu letters, ల remains unaltered by most vowel matras, and its subjoined form is simply a smaller version of the normal letter shape. Telugu conjuncts are created by reducing trailing letters to a subjoined form that appears below the initial consonant of the conjunct. Many subjoined forms are created by dropping their headline, with many extending the end of the stroke of the main letter body to form an extended tail reaching up to the right of the preceding consonant. This subjoining of trailing letters to create conjuncts is in contrast to the leading half forms of Devanagari and Bengali letters. Ligature conjuncts are not a feature in Telugu, with the only non-standard construction being an alternate subjoined form of Ṣa (borrowed from Kannada) in the KṢa conjunct.

== Malayalam La ==
Malayalam letter La

La (ല) is a consonant of the Malayalam abugida. It ultimately arose from the Brahmi letter, via the Grantha letter La. Like in other Indic scripts, Malayalam consonants have the inherent vowel "a", and take one of several modifying vowel signs to represent syllables with another vowel or no vowel at all.

Malayalam La matras: La, Lā, Li, Lī, Lu, Lū, Lr̥, Lr̥̄, Ll̥, Ll̥̄, Le, Lē, Lai, Lo, Lō, Lau, and L.

=== Conjuncts of ല ===
Malayalam letter Chillu L

As is common in Indic scripts, Malayalam joins letters together to form conjunct consonant clusters. There are several ways in which conjuncts are formed in Malayalam texts: using a post-base form of a trailing consonant placed under the initial consonant of a conjunct, a combined ligature of two or more consonants joined together, a conjoining form that appears as a combining mark on the rest of the conjunct, the use of an explicit candrakkala mark to suppress the inherent "a" vowel, or a special consonant form called a "chillu" letter, representing a bare consonant without the inherent "a" vowel. Texts written with the modern reformed Malayalam orthography, put̪iya lipi, may favor more regular conjunct forms than older texts in paḻaya lipi, due to changes undertaken in the 1970s by the Government of Kerala.

- ല് (l) + ക (ka) gives the ligature lka:

- ല് (l) + പ (pa) gives the ligature lpa:

- ല് (l) + ല (la) gives the ligature lla:

- ക് (k) + ഷ് (ṣ) + ല (la) gives the ligature kṣla:

=== Malayalam Ḻa ===
Malayalam letter Ḻa

Ḻa (ഴ) is a consonant of the Malayalam abugida. Like in other Indic scripts, Malayalam consonants have the inherent vowel "a", and take one of several modifying vowel signs to represent syllables with another vowel or no vowel at all.

Malayalam Ḻa matras: Ḻa, Ḻā, Ḻi, Ḻī, Ḻu, Ḻū, Ḻr̥, Ḻr̥̄, Ḻl̥, Ḻl̥̄, Ḻe, Ḻē, Ḻai, Ḻo, Ḻō, Ḻau, and Ḻ.

==== Conjuncts of ഴ ====
Malayalam letter Chillu Ḻ

As is common in Indic scripts, Malayalam joins letters together to form conjunct consonant clusters. There are several ways in which conjuncts are formed in Malayalam texts: using a post-base form of a trailing consonant placed under the initial consonant of a conjunct, a combined ligature of two or more consonants joined together, a conjoining form that appears as a combining mark on the rest of the conjunct, the use of an explicit candrakkala mark to suppress the inherent "a" vowel, or a special consonant form called a "chillu" letter, representing a bare consonant without the inherent "a" vowel. Texts written with the modern reformed Malayalam orthography, put̪iya lipi, may favor more regular conjunct forms than older texts in paḻaya lipi, due to changes undertaken in the 1970s by the Government of Kerala.

- ഴ് (ḻ) + ക (ka) gives the ligature ḻka:

== Odia La ==
Odia independent and subjoined letter La.

La (ଲ) is a consonant of the Odia abugida. It ultimately arose from the Brahmi letter, via the Siddhaṃ letter La. Like in other Indic scripts, Odia consonants have the inherent vowel "a", and take one of several modifying vowel signs to represent syllables with another vowel or no vowel at all.

Odia La with vowel matras
La	Lā	Li	Lī	Lu	Lū	Lr̥	Lr̥̄	Ll̥	Ll̥̄	Le	Lai	Lo	Lau	L
ଲ	ଲା	ଲି	ଲୀ	ଲୁ	ଲୂ	ଲୃ	ଲୄ	ଲୢ	ଲୣ	ଲେ	ଲୈ	ଲୋ	ଲୌ	ଲ୍

As is common in Indic scripts, Odia joins letters together to form conjunct consonant clusters. The most common conjunct formation is achieved by using a small subjoined form of trailing consonants. Most consonants' subjoined forms are identical to the full form, just reduced in size, although a few drop the curved headline or have a subjoined form not directly related to the full form of the consonant. The subjoined form of La is one of these mismatched forms, and is referred to as "La Phala". The second type of conjunct formation is through pure ligatures, where the constituent consonants are written together in a single graphic form. ଲ generates conjuncts only by subjoining and does not form ligatures.

== Kaithi La ==
Kaithi consonant La.

La (𑂪) is a consonant of the Kaithi abugida. It ultimately arose from the Brahmi letter, via the Siddhaṃ letter La. Like in other Indic scripts, Kaithi consonants have the inherent vowel "a", and take one of several modifying vowel signs to represent syllables with another vowel or no vowel at all.

Kaithi La with vowel matras
La	Lā	Li	Lī	Lu	Lū	Le	Lai	Lo	Lau	L
𑂪	𑂪𑂰	𑂪𑂱	𑂪𑂲	𑂪𑂳	𑂪𑂴	𑂪𑂵	𑂪𑂶	𑂪𑂷	𑂪𑂸	𑂪𑂹

=== Conjuncts of 𑂪 ===
As is common in Indic scripts, Kaithi joins letters together to form conjunct consonant clusters. The most common conjunct formation is achieved by using a half form of preceding consonants, although several consonants use an explicit virama. Most half forms are derived from the full form by removing the vertical stem. As is common in most Indic scripts, conjuncts of ra are indicated with a repha or rakar mark attached to the rest of the consonant cluster. In addition, there are a few vertical conjuncts that can be found in Kaithi writing, but true ligatures are not used in the modern Kaithi script.

- 𑂩୍ (r) + 𑂪 (la) gives the ligature rla:

== Tirhuta La ==
Tirhuta consonant La

La (𑒪) is a consonant of the Tirhuta abugida. It ultimately arose from the Brahmi letter, via the Siddhaṃ letter La. Like in other Indic scripts, Tirhuta consonants have the inherent vowel "a", and take one of several modifying vowel signs to represent sylables with another vowel or no vowel at all.

Tirhuta La with vowel matras
La	Lā	Li	Lī	Lu	Lū	Lṛ	Lṝ	Lḷ	Lḹ	Lē	Le	Lai	Lō	Lo	Lau	L
𑒪	𑒪𑒰	𑒪𑒱	𑒪𑒲	𑒪𑒳	𑒪𑒴	𑒪𑒵	𑒪𑒶	𑒪𑒷	𑒪𑒸	𑒪𑒹	𑒪𑒺	𑒪𑒻	𑒪𑒼	𑒪𑒽	𑒪𑒾	𑒪𑓂

=== Conjuncts of 𑒪 ===
As is common in Indic scripts, Tirhuta joins letters together to form conjunct consonant clusters. The most common conjunct formation is achieved by using an explicit virama. As is common in most Indic scripts, conjuncts of ra are indicated with a repha or rakar mark attached to the rest of the consonant cluster. In addition, other consonants take unique combining forms when in conjunct with other letters, and there are several vertical conjuncts and true ligatures that can be found in Tirhuta writing.

- 𑒯୍ (h) + 𑒪 (la) gives the ligature hla:

- 𑒏୍ (k) + 𑒪 (la) gives the ligature kla:

- 𑒪୍ (l) + 𑒩 (ra) gives the ligature lra:

- 𑒪 (l) + 𑒅 (u) gives the ligature lu:

- 𑒪୍ (l) + 𑒫 (va) gives the ligature lva:

- 𑒤୍ (pʰ) + 𑒪 (la) gives the ligature pʰla:

- 𑒩୍ (r) + 𑒪 (la) gives the ligature rla:

- 𑒬୍ (ʃ) + 𑒪 (la) gives the ligature ʃla:

- 𑒞୍ (t) + 𑒪 (la) gives the ligature tla:

== Comparison of La ==
The various Indic scripts are generally related to each other through adaptation and borrowing, and as such the glyphs for cognate letters, including La, are related as well.

Comparison of La in different scripts

Aramaic
Kharoṣṭhī 𐨫	Ashoka Brahmi 𑀮	Kushana Brahmi (Note: The middle "Kushana" form of Brahmi is a later style that emerged as Brahmi scripts were beginning to proliferate. Gupta Brahmi was definitely a stylistic descendant from Kushana, but other Brahmi-derived scripts may have descended from earlier forms.)	Tocharian (Note: Tocharian is probably derived from the middle period "Kushana" form of Brahmi, although artifacts from that time are not plentiful enough to establish a definite succession.) /
Gupta Brahmi	Pallava
Kadamba -
Bhaiksuki 𑰩	Siddhaṃ 𑖩	Grantha 𑌲	Cham ꨤ
Sinhala ල	Pyu / Old Mon (Note: Pyu and Old Mon are probably the precursors of the Burmese script, and may be derived from either the Pallava or Kadamba script) -
Tibetan ལ	Newa 𑐮	Ahom 𑜎	Malayalam ല
Telugu ల	Burmese လ
Lepcha ᰜ	Ranjana	Saurashtra ꢭ	Dives Akuru 𑤨
Kannada ಲ	Kayah Li ꤜ
Limbu ᤗ	Soyombo (Note: May also be derived from Devangari (see bottom left of table)) 𑩽	Khmer ល	Tamil ல
Chakma 𑄣	Tai Tham ᩃ
Meitei Mayek ꯂ	Gaudi -	Thai ล	Lao ລ
Tai Le ᥘ
Marchen 𑲋	Tirhuta 𑒪	New Tai Lue ᦟ	Tai Viet ꪩ	Aksara Kawi
'Phags-pa ꡙ	Odia ଲ / ଳ	Sharada 𑆬	Rejang ꤾ	Batak ᯞ / ᯟ	Buginese ᨒ
Zanabazar Square 𑨬	Bengali–Assamese ল	Takri 𑚥	Javanese ꦭ	Balinese ᬮ	Makasar 𑻮
Hangul (Note: The Origin of Hangul from 'Phags-pa is one of limited influence, inspiring at most a few basic letter shapes. Hangul does not function as an Indic abugida.) ㄹ	Northern Nagari -	Dogri 𑠥	Laṇḍā -	Sundanese ᮜ	Baybayin ᜎ
Modi 𑘩	Gujarati લ	Khojki 𑈧	Khudabadi 𑋚	Mahajani 𑅮	Tagbanwa ᝮ
Devanagari ल	Nandinagari 𑧉	Kaithi 𑂪	Gurmukhi ਲ	Multani 𑊣	Buhid ᝎ
Canadian Syllabics (Note: Although the basic letter forms of the Canadian Aboriginal Syllabics were derived from handwritten Devanagari letters, this abugida indicates vowel sounds by rotations of the letter form, rather than the use of vowel diacritics as is standard in Indic abugidas.) -	Soyombo (Note: May also be derived from Ranjana (see above)) 𑩽	Sylheti Nagari ꠟ	Gunjala Gondi 𑵵	Masaram Gondi (Note: Masaram Gondi acts as an Indic abugida, but its letterforms were not derived from any single precursor script.) 𑴧	Hanuno'o ᜮ

== Character encodings of La ==
Most Indic scripts are encoded in the Unicode Standard, and as such the letter La in those scripts can be represented in plain text with unique codepoint. La from several modern-use scripts can also be found in legacy encodings, such as ISCII.

Character information
Preview					લ	
Unicode name	DEVANAGARI LETTER LA		BENGALI LETTER LA		GUJARATI LETTER LA	
Encodings	decimal	hex	dec	hex	dec	hex
Unicode	2354	U+0932	2482	U+09B2	2738	U+0AB2
UTF-8	224 164 178	E0 A4 B2	224 166 178	E0 A6 B2	224 170 178	E0 AA B2
Numeric character reference	&#2354;	&#x932;	&#2482;	&#x9B2;	&#2738;	&#xAB2;
ISCII	209	D1	209	D1	209	D1

- See further below for Tamil, Telugu, Kannada, Malayalam and Gurmukhi codepoints.

Character information
Preview	𐨫			
Unicode name	KHAROSHTHI LETTER LA		SIDDHAM LETTER LA	
Encodings	decimal	hex	dec	hex
Unicode	68139	U+10A2B	71081	U+115A9
UTF-8	240 144 168 171	F0 90 A8 AB	240 145 150 169	F0 91 96 A9
UTF-16	55298 56875	D802 DE2B	55301 56745	D805 DDA9
Numeric character reference	&#68139;	&#x10A2B;	&#71081;	&#x115A9;

- See further below for Brahmi and Grantha codepoints.

Character information
Preview			ླ		ꡙ		𑨬		𑐮		𑰩		𑆬	
Unicode name	TIBETAN LETTER LA		TIBETAN SUBJOINED LETTER LA		PHAGS-PA LETTER LA		ZANABAZAR SQUARE LETTER LA		NEWA LETTER LA		BHAIKSUKI LETTER LA		SHARADA LETTER LA	
Encodings	decimal	hex	dec	hex	dec	hex	dec	hex	dec	hex	dec	hex	dec	hex
Unicode	3939	U+0F63	4019	U+0FB3	43097	U+A859	72236	U+11A2C	70702	U+1142E	72745	U+11C29	70060	U+111AC
UTF-8	224 189 163	E0 BD A3	224 190 179	E0 BE B3	234 161 153	EA A1 99	240 145 168 172	F0 91 A8 AC	240 145 144 174	F0 91 90 AE	240 145 176 169	F0 91 B0 A9	240 145 134 172	F0 91 86 AC
UTF-16	3939	0F63	4019	0FB3	43097	A859	55302 56876	D806 DE2C	55301 56366	D805 DC2E	55303 56361	D807 DC29	55300 56748	D804 DDAC
Numeric character reference	&#3939;	&#xF63;	&#4019;	&#xFB3;	&#43097;	&#xA859;	&#72236;	&#x11A2C;	&#70702;	&#x1142E;	&#72745;	&#x11C29;	&#70060;	&#x111AC;

Character information
Preview	လ	
Unicode name	MYANMAR LETTER LA	
Encodings	decimal	hex
Unicode	4124	U+101C
UTF-8	225 128 156	E1 80 9C
Numeric character reference	&#4124;	&#x101C;

- See further below for Tai Tham and New Tai Lue codepoints.

Character information
Preview	ល		ล		ꪩ	
Unicode name	KHMER LETTER LO		THAI CHARACTER LO LING		TAI VIET LETTER HIGH LO	
Encodings	decimal	hex	dec	hex	dec	hex
Unicode	6043	U+179B	3621	U+0E25	43689	U+AAA9
UTF-8	225 158 155	E1 9E 9B	224 184 165	E0 B8 A5	234 170 169	EA AA A9
Numeric character reference	&#6043;	&#x179B;	&#3621;	&#xE25;	&#43689;	&#xAAA9;

- See further below for Lao codepoints.

Character information
Preview	ꤜ		𑄣		ᥘ		𑜎		ꨤ	
Unicode name	KAYAH LI LETTER LA		CHAKMA LETTER LAA		TAI LE LETTER LA		AHOM LETTER LA		CHAM LETTER LA	
Encodings	decimal	hex	dec	hex	dec	hex	dec	hex	dec	hex
Unicode	43292	U+A91C	69923	U+11123	6488	U+1958	71438	U+1170E	43556	U+AA24
UTF-8	234 164 156	EA A4 9C	240 145 132 163	F0 91 84 A3	225 165 152	E1 A5 98	240 145 156 142	F0 91 9C 8E	234 168 164	EA A8 A4
UTF-16	43292	A91C	55300 56611	D804 DD23	6488	1958	55301 57102	D805 DF0E	43556	AA24
Numeric character reference	&#43292;	&#xA91C;	&#69923;	&#x11123;	&#6488;	&#x1958;	&#71438;	&#x1170E;	&#43556;	&#xAA24;

- See further below for Sinhala, Dives Akura and Saurashtra codepoints.

Character information
Preview	𑘩		𑧉		𑩽		ꠟ		𑵵			
Unicode name	MODI LETTER LA		NANDINAGARI LETTER LA		SOYOMBO LETTER LA		SYLOTI NAGRI LETTER LO		GUNJALA GONDI LETTER LA		KAITHI LETTER LA	
Encodings	decimal	hex	dec	hex	dec	hex	dec	hex	dec	hex	dec	hex
Unicode	71209	U+11629	72137	U+119C9	72317	U+11A7D	43039	U+A81F	73077	U+11D75	69802	U+110AA
UTF-8	240 145 152 169	F0 91 98 A9	240 145 167 137	F0 91 A7 89	240 145 169 189	F0 91 A9 BD	234 160 159	EA A0 9F	240 145 181 181	F0 91 B5 B5	240 145 130 170	F0 91 82 AA
UTF-16	55301 56873	D805 DE29	55302 56777	D806 DDC9	55302 56957	D806 DE7D	43039	A81F	55303 56693	D807 DD75	55300 56490	D804 DCAA
Numeric character reference	&#71209;	&#x11629;	&#72137;	&#x119C9;	&#72317;	&#x11A7D;	&#43039;	&#xA81F;	&#73077;	&#x11D75;	&#69802;	&#x110AA;

Character information
Preview	𑒪		ᰜ		ᤗ		ꯂ		𑲋	
Unicode name	TIRHUTA LETTER LA		LEPCHA LETTER LA		LIMBU LETTER LA		MEETEI MAYEK LETTER LAI		MARCHEN LETTER LA	
Encodings	decimal	hex	dec	hex	dec	hex	dec	hex	dec	hex
Unicode	70826	U+114AA	7196	U+1C1C	6423	U+1917	43970	U+ABC2	72843	U+11C8B
UTF-8	240 145 146 170	F0 91 92 AA	225 176 156	E1 B0 9C	225 164 151	E1 A4 97	234 175 130	EA AF 82	240 145 178 139	F0 91 B2 8B
UTF-16	55301 56490	D805 DCAA	7196	1C1C	6423	1917	43970	ABC2	55303 56459	D807 DC8B
Numeric character reference	&#70826;	&#x114AA;	&#7196;	&#x1C1C;	&#6423;	&#x1917;	&#43970;	&#xABC2;	&#72843;	&#x11C8B;

Character information
Preview	𑚥		𑠥		𑈧		𑋚		𑅮		𑊣	
Unicode name	TAKRI LETTER LA		DOGRA LETTER LA		KHOJKI LETTER LA		KHUDAWADI LETTER LA		MAHAJANI LETTER LA		MULTANI LETTER LA	
Encodings	decimal	hex	dec	hex	dec	hex	dec	hex	dec	hex	dec	hex
Unicode	71333	U+116A5	71717	U+11825	70183	U+11227	70362	U+112DA	69998	U+1116E	70307	U+112A3
UTF-8	240 145 154 165	F0 91 9A A5	240 145 160 165	F0 91 A0 A5	240 145 136 167	F0 91 88 A7	240 145 139 154	F0 91 8B 9A	240 145 133 174	F0 91 85 AE	240 145 138 163	F0 91 8A A3
UTF-16	55301 56997	D805 DEA5	55302 56357	D806 DC25	55300 56871	D804 DE27	55300 57050	D804 DEDA	55300 56686	D804 DD6E	55300 56995	D804 DEA3
Numeric character reference	&#71333;	&#x116A5;	&#71717;	&#x11825;	&#70183;	&#x11227;	&#70362;	&#x112DA;	&#69998;	&#x1116E;	&#70307;	&#x112A3;

Character information
Preview	ᬮ		ᯞ		ᨒ		ꦭ		𑻮		ꤾ		ᮜ	
Unicode name	BALINESE LETTER LA		BATAK LETTER LA		BUGINESE LETTER LA		JAVANESE LETTER LA		MAKASAR LETTER LA		REJANG LETTER LA		SUNDANESE LETTER LA	
Encodings	decimal	hex	dec	hex	dec	hex	dec	hex	dec	hex	dec	hex	dec	hex
Unicode	6958	U+1B2E	7134	U+1BDE	6674	U+1A12	43437	U+A9AD	73454	U+11EEE	43326	U+A93E	7068	U+1B9C
UTF-8	225 172 174	E1 AC AE	225 175 158	E1 AF 9E	225 168 146	E1 A8 92	234 166 173	EA A6 AD	240 145 187 174	F0 91 BB AE	234 164 190	EA A4 BE	225 174 156	E1 AE 9C
UTF-16	6958	1B2E	7134	1BDE	6674	1A12	43437	A9AD	55303 57070	D807 DEEE	43326	A93E	7068	1B9C
Numeric character reference	&#6958;	&#x1B2E;	&#7134;	&#x1BDE;	&#6674;	&#x1A12;	&#43437;	&#xA9AD;	&#73454;	&#x11EEE;	&#43326;	&#xA93E;	&#7068;	&#x1B9C;

Character information
Preview	ᜎ		ᝮ		ᝎ		ᜮ		𑴧	
Unicode name	TAGALOG LETTER LA		TAGBANWA LETTER LA		BUHID LETTER LA		HANUNOO LETTER LA		MASARAM GONDI LETTER LA	
Encodings	decimal	hex	dec	hex	dec	hex	dec	hex	dec	hex
Unicode	5902	U+170E	5998	U+176E	5966	U+174E	5934	U+172E	72999	U+11D27
UTF-8	225 156 142	E1 9C 8E	225 157 174	E1 9D AE	225 157 142	E1 9D 8E	225 156 174	E1 9C AE	240 145 180 167	F0 91 B4 A7
UTF-16	5902	170E	5998	176E	5966	174E	5934	172E	55303 56615	D807 DD27
Numeric character reference	&#5902;	&#x170E;	&#5998;	&#x176E;	&#5966;	&#x174E;	&#5934;	&#x172E;	&#72999;	&#x11D27;

Character information
Preview	ല		ൽ		ਲ	
Unicode name	MALAYALAM LETTER LA		MALAYALAM LETTER CHILLU L		GURMUKHI LETTER LA	
Encodings	decimal	hex	dec	hex	dec	hex
Unicode	3378	U+0D32	3453	U+0D7D	2610	U+0A32
UTF-8	224 180 178	E0 B4 B2	224 181 189	E0 B5 BD	224 168 178	E0 A8 B2
Numeric character reference	&#3378;	&#xD32;	&#3453;	&#xD7D;	&#2610;	&#xA32;

Character information
Preview	Ashoka Kushana Gupta		𑌲	
Unicode name	BRAHMI LETTER LA		GRANTHA LETTER LA	
Encodings	decimal	hex	dec	hex
Unicode	69678	U+1102E	70450	U+11332
UTF-8	240 145 128 174	F0 91 80 AE	240 145 140 178	F0 91 8C B2
UTF-16	55300 56366	D804 DC2E	55300 57138	D804 DF32
Numeric character reference	&#69678;	&#x1102E;	&#70450;	&#x11332;

Character information
Preview	ᩃ		ᩖ		ᩓ		ᩗ		ᦟ		ᦜ		᧞		᧟	
Unicode name	TAI THAM LETTER LA		TAI THAM CONSONANT SIGN MEDIAL LA		TAI THAM LETTER LAE		TAI THAM CONSONANT SIGN LA TANG LAI		NEW TAI LUE LETTER LOW LA		NEW TAI LUE LETTER HIGH LA		NEW TAI LUE SIGN LAE		NEW TAI LUE SIGN LAEV	
Encodings	decimal	hex	dec	hex	dec	hex	dec	hex	dec	hex	dec	hex	dec	hex	dec	hex
Unicode	6723	U+1A43	6742	U+1A56	6739	U+1A53	6743	U+1A57	6559	U+199F	6556	U+199C	6622	U+19DE	6623	U+19DF
UTF-8	225 169 131	E1 A9 83	225 169 150	E1 A9 96	225 169 147	E1 A9 93	225 169 151	E1 A9 97	225 166 159	E1 A6 9F	225 166 156	E1 A6 9C	225 167 158	E1 A7 9E	225 167 159	E1 A7 9F
Numeric character reference	&#6723;	&#x1A43;	&#6742;	&#x1A56;	&#6739;	&#x1A53;	&#6743;	&#x1A57;	&#6559;	&#x199F;	&#6556;	&#x199C;	&#6622;	&#x19DE;	&#6623;	&#x19DF;

Character information
Preview	ລ		ຼ	
Unicode name	LAO LETTER LO LOOT		LAO SEMIVOWEL SIGN LO	
Encodings	decimal	hex	dec	hex
Unicode	3749	U+0EA5	3772	U+0EBC
UTF-8	224 186 165	E0 BA A5	224 186 188	E0 BA BC
Numeric character reference	&#3749;	&#xEA5;	&#3772;	&#xEBC;
