= Official scripts of India =

Officially mandated writing systems in India

There are several official scripts of India, which are either used officially by the Union government or by the state governments. The official languages of the Indian Union are Hindi and English, whereas the Devanagari script is used to write Hindi and the Latin script is used for English. The Eighth Schedule to the Constitution of India lists languages that are officially recognised by the Indian government. However, the state legislatures are free to adopt by law any languages as official ones.

== Bengali–Assamese Script ==
The Bengali–Assamese script is the official script for the Bengali and Assamese languages in West Bengal, Assam and Tripura.

== Devanagari Script ==
The Constitution of India says:

The official language of the Union shall be Hindi in Devanagari script. The form of numerals to be used for the official purposes of the Union shall be the international form of Indian numerals.

— Part XVII of the Indian Constitution

Being the official script for Hindi, Devanagari is officially used in the Union Government of India as well as several Indian states where Hindi is an official language: Bihar, Chhattisgarh, Haryana, Himachal Pradesh, Jharkhand, Madhya Pradesh, Mizoram, Rajasthan, Uttar Pradesh and Uttarakhand, and the Indian union territories of Delhi, Andaman and Nicobar Islands and Dadra and Nagar Haveli and Daman and Diu. Gujarat and West Bengal also officially use Devanagari, as these two states recognise Hindi as an additional official language.

The Devanagari script (देवनागरी, romanized: Devanāgarī) is the officially mandated script of the Nepali language in Sikkim and West Bengal, Marathi language in Maharashtra and Goa, Bodo language in Assam, the Konkani language in Goa, and Sanskrit in Himachal Pradesh.

== Gujarati script ==
The Gujarati script is the official script for the Gujarati language in Gujarat and the union territory of Dadra and Nagar Haveli and Daman and Diu.

== Gurmukhi Script ==
The Gurmukhi script (Punjabi: ਗੁਰਮੁਖੀ) is the official script for the Punjabi language in Punjab, and Delhi.

== Kannada Script ==
The Kannada script is the official script for the Kannada language in Karnataka.

== Latin Script ==
The Latin Script is the official script for the English language in Union Government of India and its states like Arunachal Pradesh, Meghalaya, Mizoram, Nagaland, Tripura, Andaman and Nicobar Islands.

== Malayalam Script ==
The Malayalam script is the official script for the Malayalam language in Kerala.

== Meitei Script ==
The Meitei script (Meitei: ꯃꯩꯇꯩ ꯃꯌꯦꯛ, romanized: Meitei mayek) is the officially mandated script for the Meitei language of Manipur, replacing the Bengali script, albeit with some allowance for parallel use. It is also used in Assam for the Meitei language.

== Odia script ==
The Odia script is the official script for the Odia language in Odisha.

== Ol Chiki Script ==
The Ol Chiki script (ᱚᱞ ᱪᱤᱠᱤ, Santali pronunciation: [ɔl tʃiki], ɔl 'writing', tʃiki 'symbol') is the official script for the Santali language in Jharkhand and West Bengal.

== Perso-Arabic script ==
The Perso-Arabic script is the official script for Kashmiri and Urdu languages in Jammu and Kashmir.

== Telugu Script ==
The Telugu script (Telugu: తెలుగు లిపి, romanized: Telugu lipi) is the official script for the Telugu language in Andhra Pradesh, Telangana and Union Territory Puducherry.

== Tamil Script ==
The Tamil script (Tamil: தமிழ் அரிச்சுவடி, romanized: Tamiḻ ariccuvaṭi) is the official script for the Tamil language in Tamil Nadu and Union Territory Puducherry. Although there is no explicit legal provision defining the Tamil script as the official script, it is implicitly recognised as such since it is used in the formulation of laws and official documents.

== See also ==
- Classical languages of India
- Directorate of Language Planning and Implementation
- Official Languages Commission
- Part XVII of the Constitution of India
