= Nandinagari =

South Indian script related to Devanāgarī

Nandināgarī 𑧁𑧞𑦿𑧒𑧁𑧑𑦰𑧈𑧓
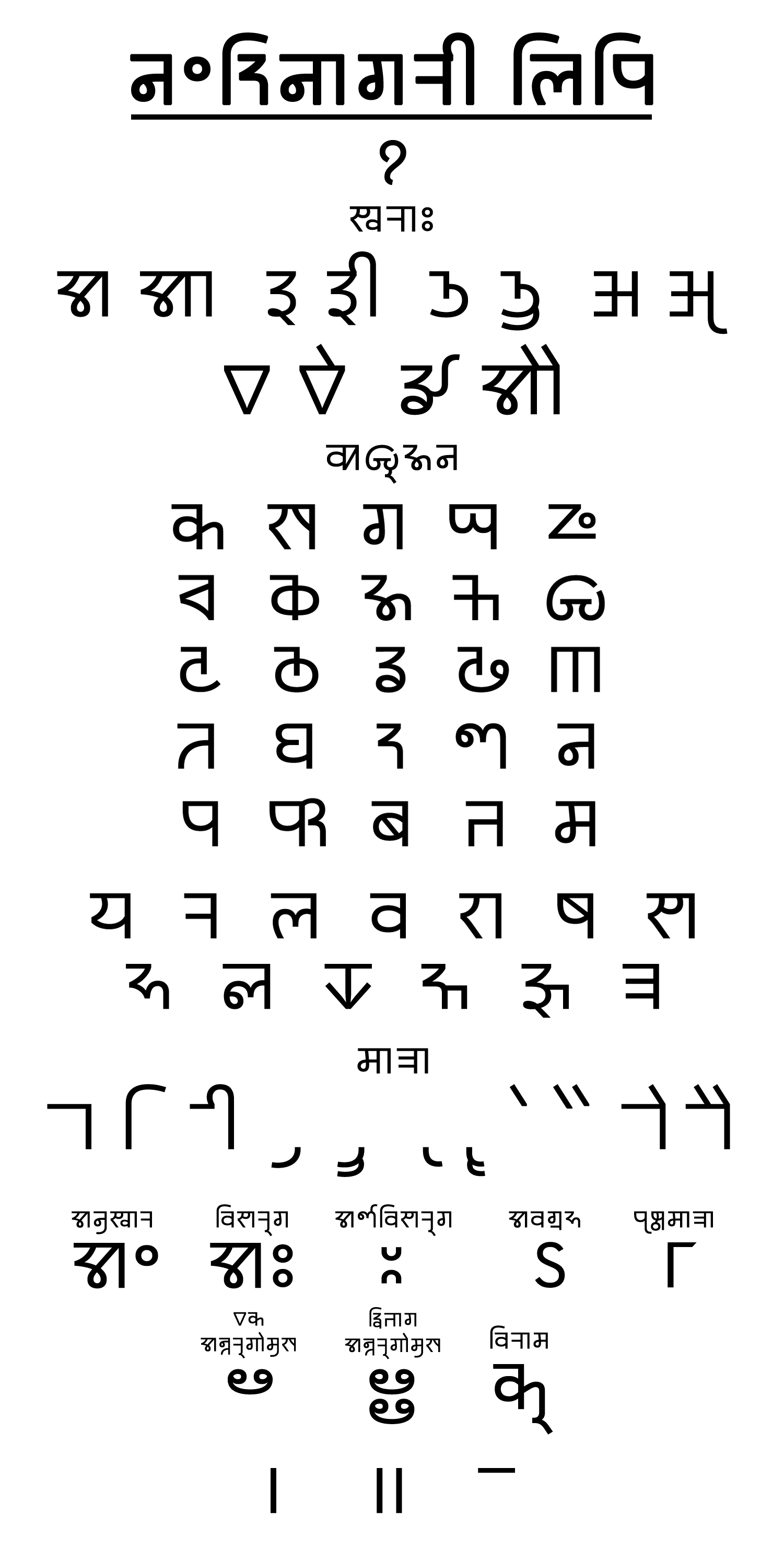
- Nandināgarī Varnamala chart
- Script type: Abugida
- Period: c. 11th to 19th century
- Direction: Left-to-right
- Languages: Sanskrit and Kannada

Related scripts
- Parent systems: Proto-Sinaitic: Phoenician; Aramaic; Brāhmī; Gupta; Siddhaṃ; Nāgarī; Nandināgarī
- Sister systems: Devanāgarī, Kaithi, Gujarāti, Moḍī

ISO 15924
- ISO 15924: Nand (311), Nandinagari

Unicode
- Unicode alias: Nandinagari
- Unicode range: U+119A0–U+119FF

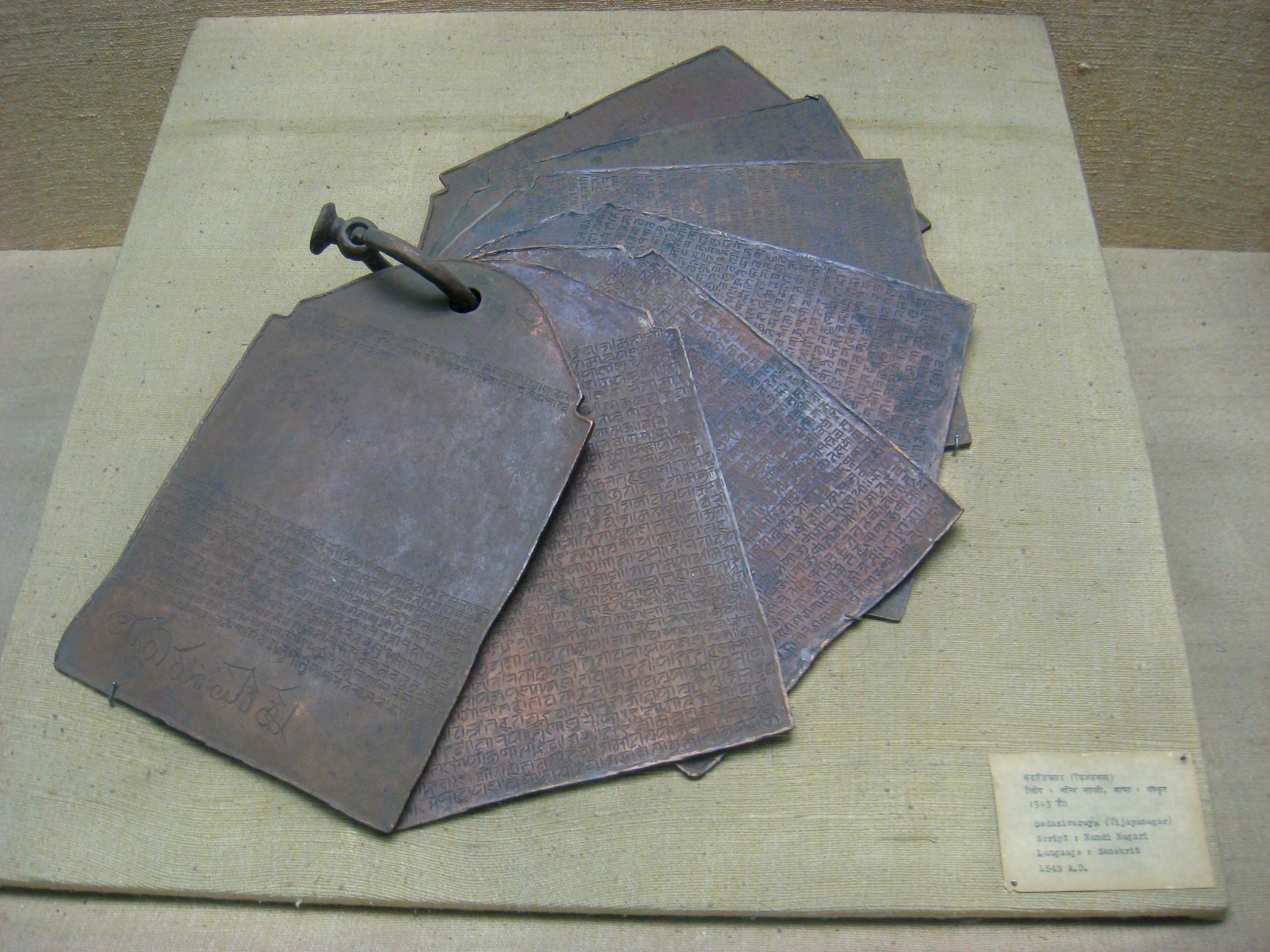
A 16th century CE Sanskrit record of Sadasiva Raya in Nandināgarī script engraved on copper plates. Manuscripts and records in Nandināgarī were created and preserved historically by creating inscriptions on metal plates, specially treated palm leaves, slabs of stone and paper.

Nandināgarī is a Brahmic script derived from the Nāgarī script which appeared in the 7th century AD. This script and its variants were used in the central Deccan region and south India, and an abundance of Sanskrit manuscripts in Nandināgarī have been discovered but remain untransliterated. Some of the discovered manuscripts of Madhvacharya of the Dvaita Vedanta school of Hinduism are in Nandināgarī script.

It is a sister script to Devanāgarī, which is common in other parts of India.

== Etymology ==
Nāgarī comes from नगर (nagara), which means city.

There have been Nandināgarī inscriptions from the Kakatiya period found in Mahabubabad, located 212 km from Nandi Nagar, Hyderabad.

The first part of the term "Nandi" is ambiguous in its context. It may mean "sacred" or "auspicious" (cf. Nandi verses in Sanskrit drama). Nandi is the name of Lord Siva's Vrishabhavahana (bull vehicle), a revered icon, and it may be the source of the name.

== History ==
Nandināgarī is a Brāhmī-based script that was used in southern India between the 11th and 19th centuries AD for producing manuscripts and inscriptions in Sanskrit in south Maharashtra, Karnataka and Andhra Pradesh. It derives from the central group of Nāgarī scripts and is related to Devanāgarī. There are also several styles of Nandināgarī, considered by scholars as variant forms of the script.

Some of the earliest inscriptions in Nandināgarī have been found in Tamil Nadu. The 8th century Narasimha Pallava's stone inscriptions in Mamallapuram on Tamil Nadu's coast, the 10th-century coins from Chola king Rajaraja's period, the Paliyam copper plate inscriptions of the 9th century Ay king Varagunam are all in Nandināgarī script. A Rigveda manuscript has been found written in Nandināgarī script, as well as manuscripts of other Vedas. Manuscripts of the first century BCE Vikramacarita, also known as the "Adventures of Vikrama" or the "Hindu Book of Tales", have been found in Nandinagari script.

In a Travancore temple of Kerala, an Anantasayana Mahatmya palm-leaf manuscript was found, and it is in Nandināgarī script.

Nandināgarī script was used to spell the Sanskrit language, and many Sanskrit copper plate inscriptions of the Vijayanagara Empire were written in that script.

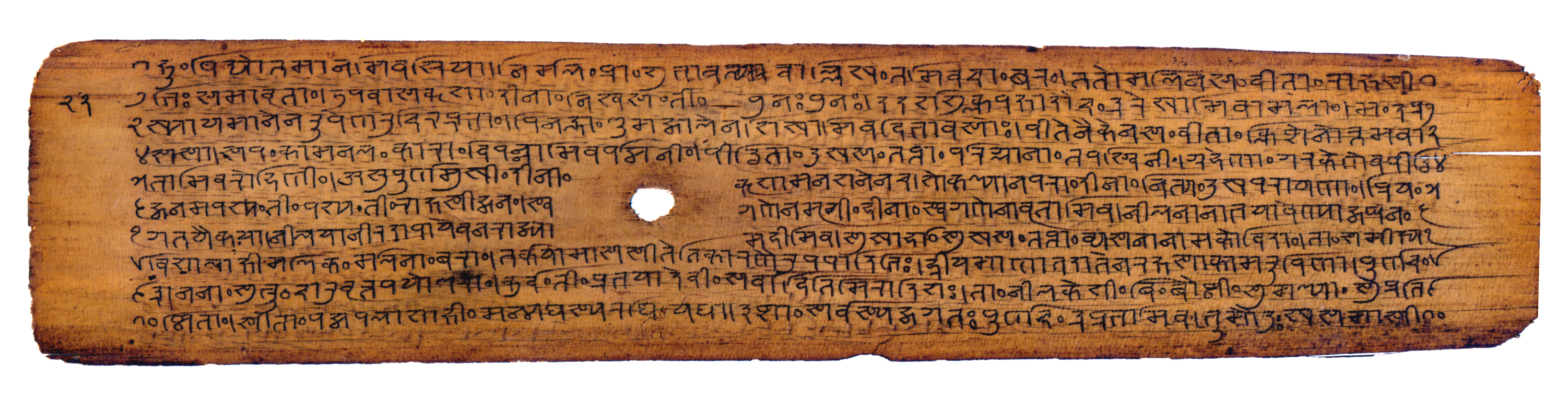
A Nandināgarī manuscript

Numerous Sanskrit manuscripts written in Nandināgarī have been discovered in South India, but it is one of the least documented and studied ancient scripts of India. These cover Vedas, philosophy, commentaries on ancient works, mythology, science and arts. These are preserved in the manuscript libraries, particularly those in the southern regions of the country. Some Nandināgarī texts are in biscript that include other major south India language scripts, such as Telugu, Tamil, Malayalam and Kannada scripts.

== Comparison to Devanāgarī ==
Nandināgarī and Devanāgarī scripts are very close and share many similarities, but they also show systematic differences. Nandināgarī differs from Devanāgarī more in the shape of its vowels, and less in many consonant shapes. It has an overline at the top of each character but does not conjoin them across whole words as one long, connected, horizontal line (shirorekhā). Nandināgarī is thus a sister script of Devanāgarī, but not a trivial variation.

The Nandināgarī manuscripts also show cosmetic and style differences, such as the use of distinct Anusvaras and method of labeling each hymn or verse.

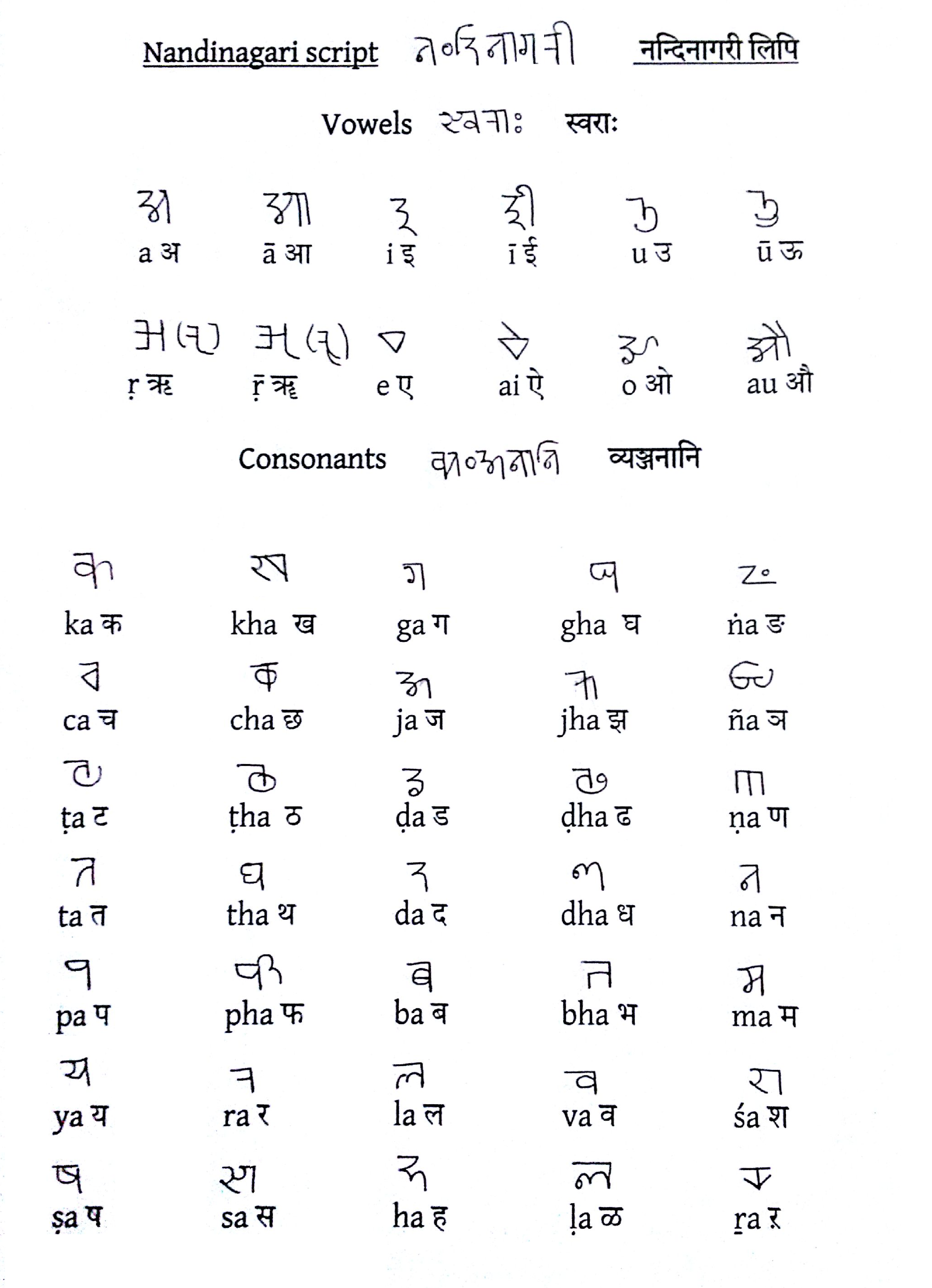
A chart showing Nandinagari script

== Unicode ==
Nandināgarī script was added to the Unicode Standard in March 2019 with the release of version 12.0.

The Unicode block for Nandināgarī is U+119A0–U+119FF:

Nandinagari^{[1]}^{[2]} Official Unicode Consortium code chart (PDF)
	0	1	2	3	4	5	6	7	8	9	A	B	C	D	E	F
U+119Ax	𑦠	𑦡	𑦢	𑦣	𑦤	𑦥	𑦦	𑦧			𑦪	𑦫	𑦬	𑦭	𑦮	𑦯
U+119Bx	𑦰	𑦱	𑦲	𑦳	𑦴	𑦵	𑦶	𑦷	𑦸	𑦹	𑦺	𑦻	𑦼	𑦽	𑦾	𑦿
U+119Cx	𑧀	𑧁	𑧂	𑧃	𑧄	𑧅	𑧆	𑧇	𑧈	𑧉	𑧊	𑧋	𑧌	𑧍	𑧎	𑧏
U+119Dx	𑧐	𑧑	𑧒	𑧓	𑧔	𑧕	𑧖	𑧗			𑧚	𑧛	𑧜	𑧝	𑧞	𑧟
U+119Ex	𑧠	𑧡	𑧢	𑧣	𑧤											
U+119Fx																
Notes 1.As of Unicode version 17.0 2.Grey areas indicate non-assigned code points

== See also ==
- Shiksha – the Vedic study of sound, focusing on the letters of the Sanskrit alphabet
