= Nudi =

Nudi may refer to:

- Nudi - means language; speech; talk in Kannada
- Nudi (software), a computer program to type in Kannada script
- Nudi, Iran, a village in Ardabil Province, Iran
- Mario Nudi (1912–1945), Italian soldier and police officer
