= Srinivagilu inscriptions and hero stones =

Coordinates: 12.9324°N 77.6405°E

Srinivagilu is a sub-locality in Koramangala, Bengaluru, with a recorded history dating back to at least the 8th century CE.

It is home to two historical stone inscriptions found near a Shiva temple in the Ibbalur Military Camp: a hero stone inscription in the Kannada script mentioning the name Siyanelvagila, and an incomplete Tamil inscription.

== History ==
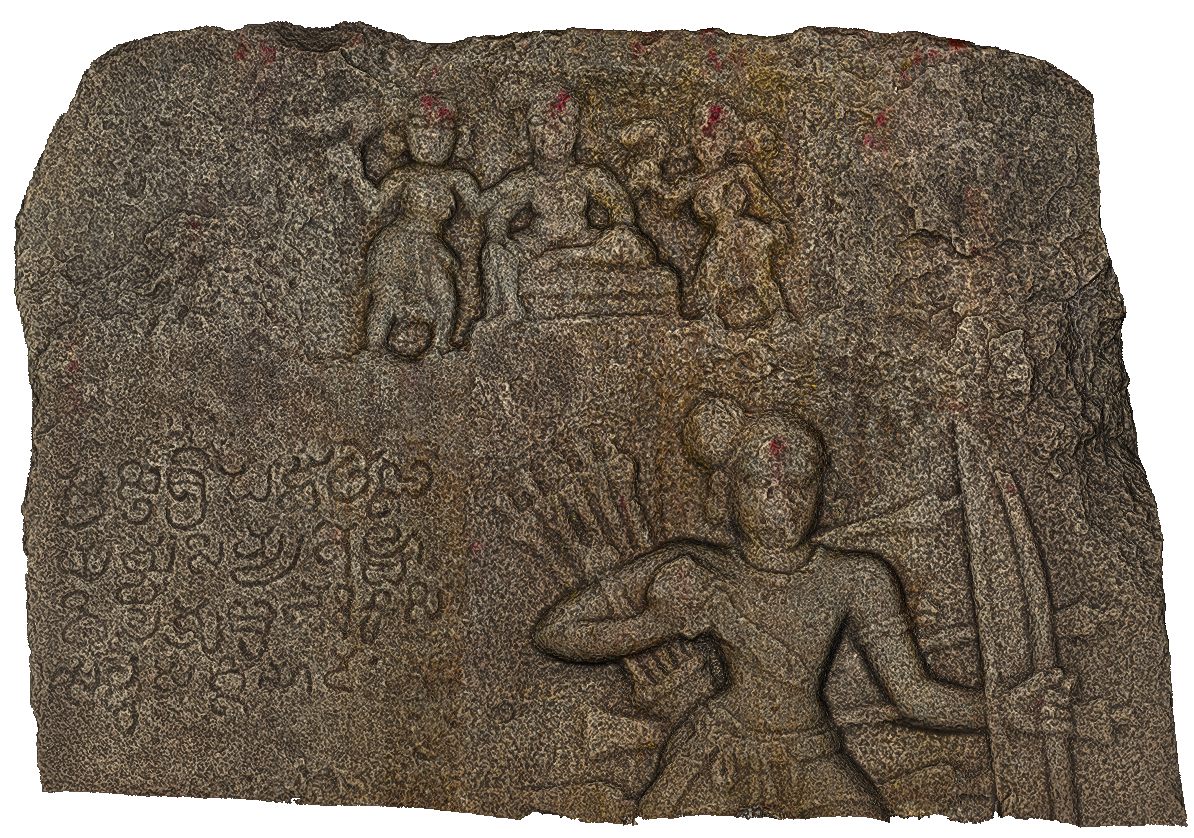
Digital image of the Srinivagilu 800CE Palchatereyamma's Turugol Herostone with inscription.

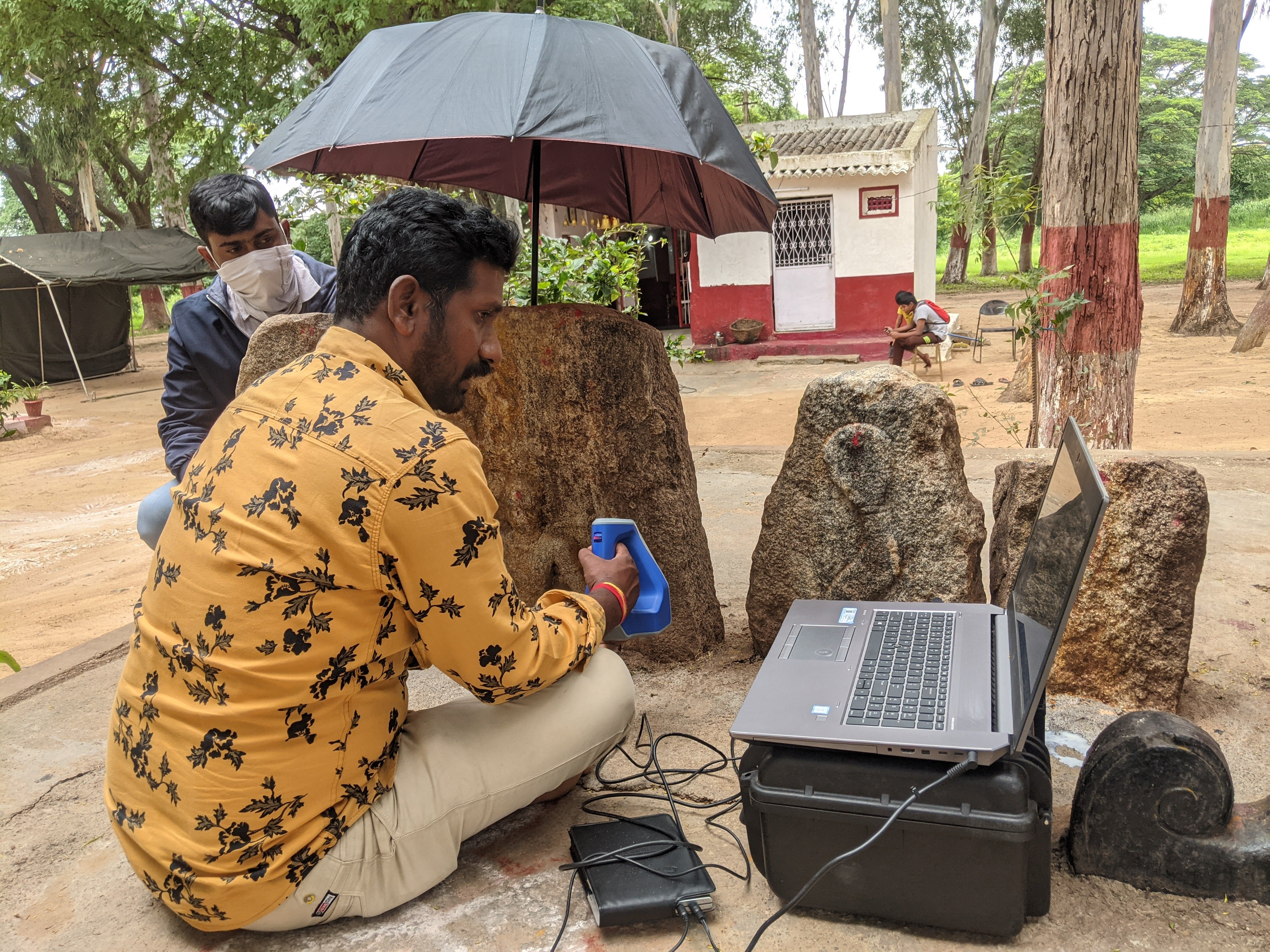
3D scanning of the Srinivagilu 800CE Palchatereyamma's Turugol Herostone with inscription.

The older inscription is a Kannada hero stone paleographically dated to the 8th century CE. It commemorates the death of Palchhatereyamma, who fought thieves to rescue cows (turugol) in the village of Siyanelvagila (present-day Srinivagilu). Historian and epigraphist P. V. Krishnamurthy derives the etymology of Siyanelvagila from siya or sihi ("sweet") + nel ("paddy") + bagilu ("place"), meaning "the place where sweet paddy was grown". Over time, the name evolved into Srinivagilu. Turugol refers to cattle raiding. Because cattle were an important source of wealth, raids were commonplace. Numerous inscriptions document cattle raids in various villages and recount the deaths of those who defended against them.

=== Physical characteristics ===
The inscription is 64 cm tall and 87 cm wide. The Kannada characters are approximately 3 cm tall, 4 cm wide, and 0.15 cm deep, making them rather shallow. The upper section of the relief depicts a man seated on a stool, flanked by apsaras holding flywhisks (chamara). The lower section depicts a standing man grasping a bow and a long dagger, with a quiver of arrows strapped over his shoulders and arrows piercing his body. Because the lower part of the stone is buried or damaged, only the primary subject's top half, from the knees up, is visible.

=== Transliteration of the inscription ===
The inscription was first published by P. V. Krishnamurthy in Itihasa Darshana Vol 24, 2009. The text below is the rereading published in the Journal of the Mythic Society.

Digital images of the characters, the inscription, and other related information are available via the Akshara Bhandara software.

| Line number | Kannada | IAST |
|---|---|---|
| 1 | ಸ್ವಸ್ತಿಶ್ರೀ ಪಳ್ಚತೆಱೆ | svastiśrī pal̤c̤atĕṟĕ |
| 2 | ಯಮ್ಮ ಸಿಯ್ಯನೆಲ್ವಾ | yamma siyyanĕlvā |
| 3 | ಗಿಲ ತುಱುವನಿಕಿಸಿ | gila tuṟuvanikisi |
| 4 | ಸತ್ತು ಸಗ್ಗಿಯಾದಂ | sattu saggiyādaṃ |

== 15th-century Kailaiyam Udayar boundary inscription ==
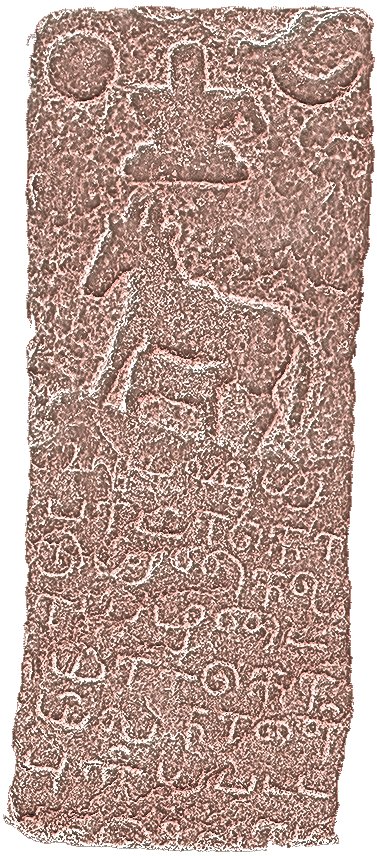
3D Scanned Digital Image Of The Srinivagilu 15th-century Kailaiyam Udayar boundary Tamil inscription.

A second engraving at the site is a Tamil-language inscription written in Grantha and Tamil characters, paleographically dated to the 15th century CE. The context is unclear because the text is incomplete. The Mythic Society Bengaluru Inscriptions 3D Digital Conservation Project team discovered the stone and published its findings in the Quarterly Journal of the Mythic Society. The inscription may have some connection with the Shiva Temple. Both the inscription and temple are located in military-controlled lands, so prior permission and coordination may be required for general public access.

=== Physical characteristics ===
The inscription is 94 cm tall and 36 cm wide. The Grantha and Tamil characters are 4.5 cm tall, 3.6 cm wide, and 0.5 cm deep.

=== Translation ===
The text was published in the Quarterly Journal of the Mythic Society.

Swasthi Sri Paadirakodu. Sri Kailaiyamudayar temple's land. Puliya patta.....

== Gallery ==
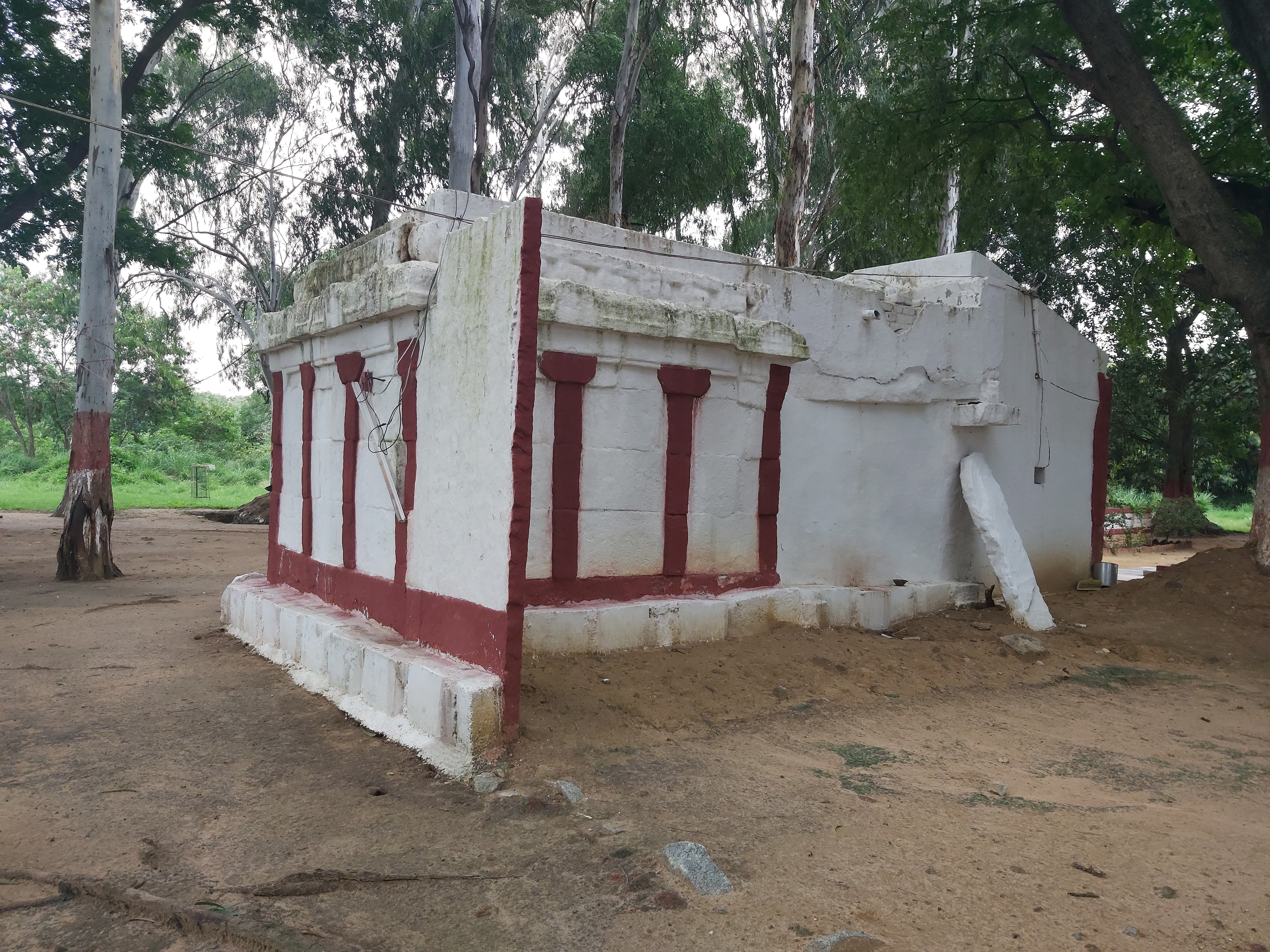
A 10th-century Shiva Temple at Srinivagilu

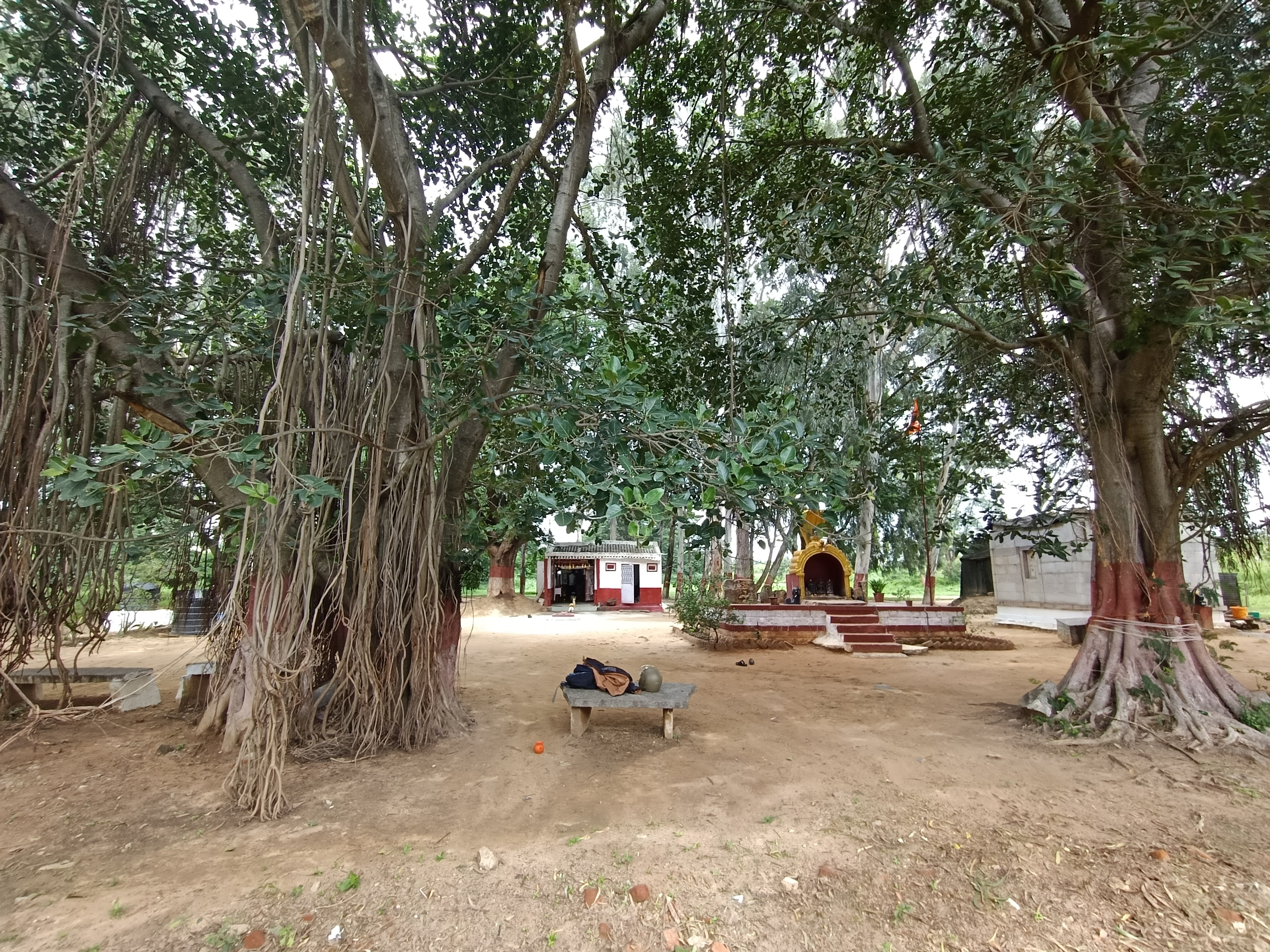
Wide angle view of the Srinivagilu Temple

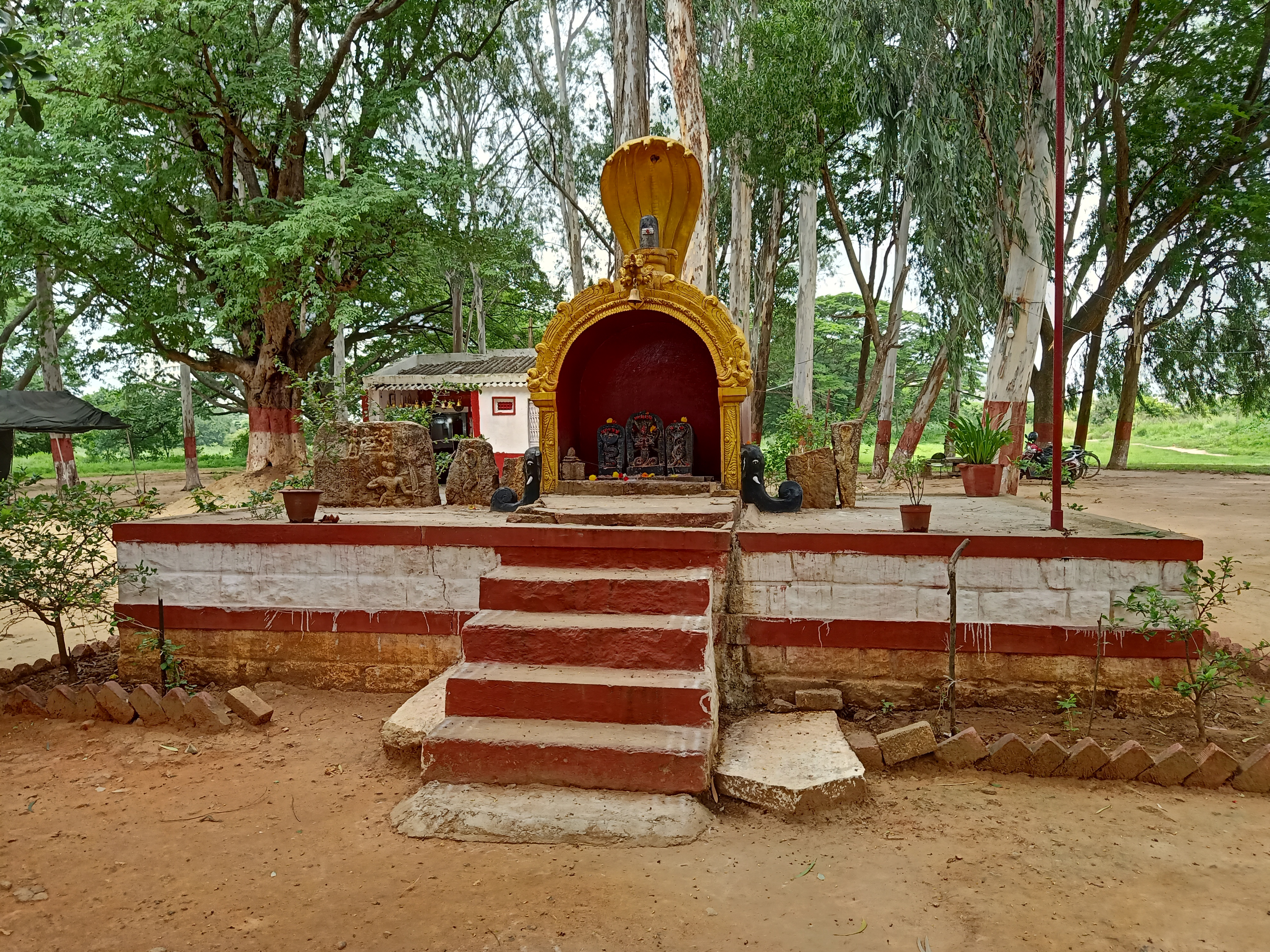
Wide angle view Srinivagilu 8th-century Palchtereyamma Herostone with Inscription

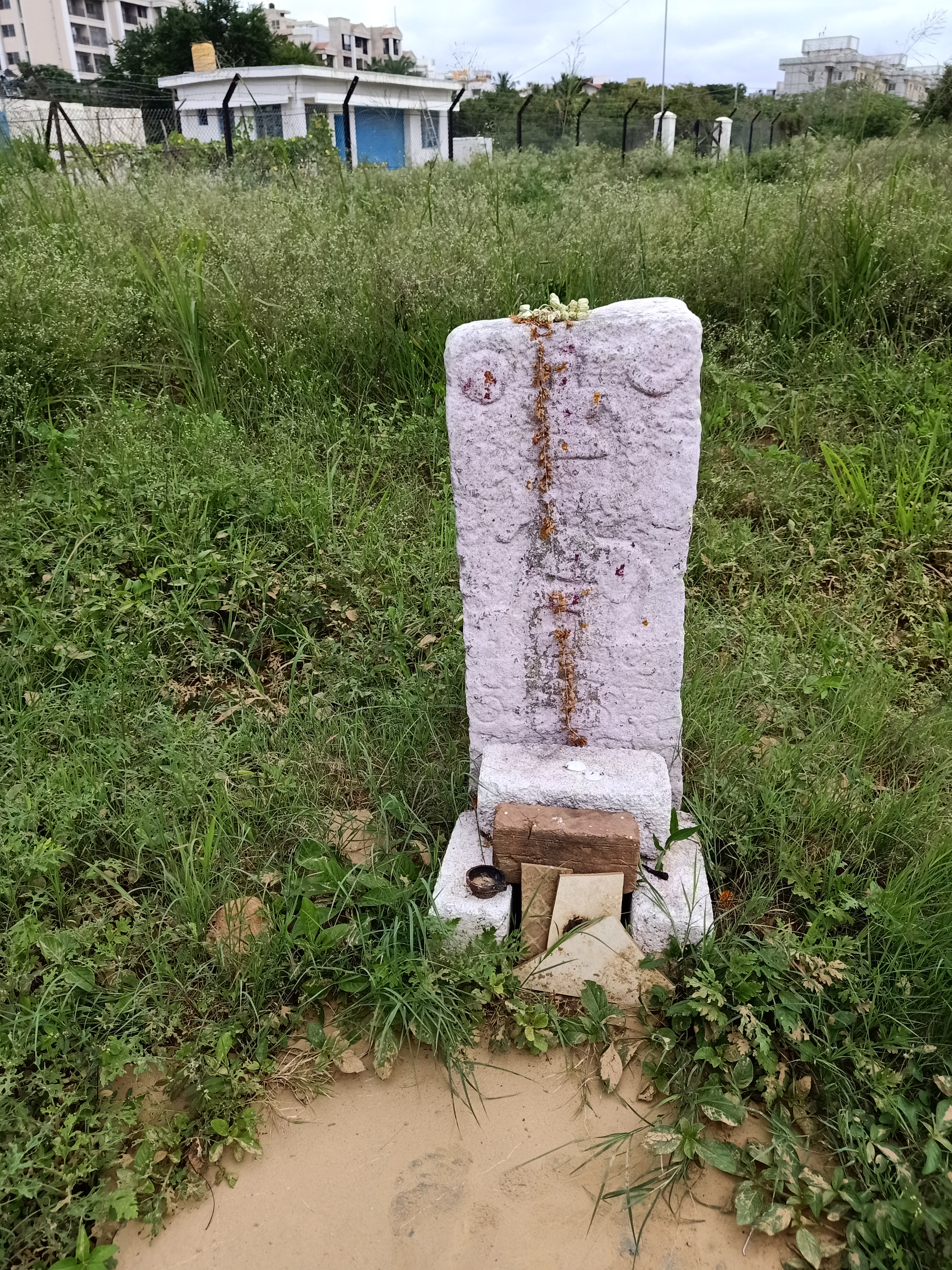
Srinivagilu 15th-century Kailaiyam Udayar boundary Tamil inscription

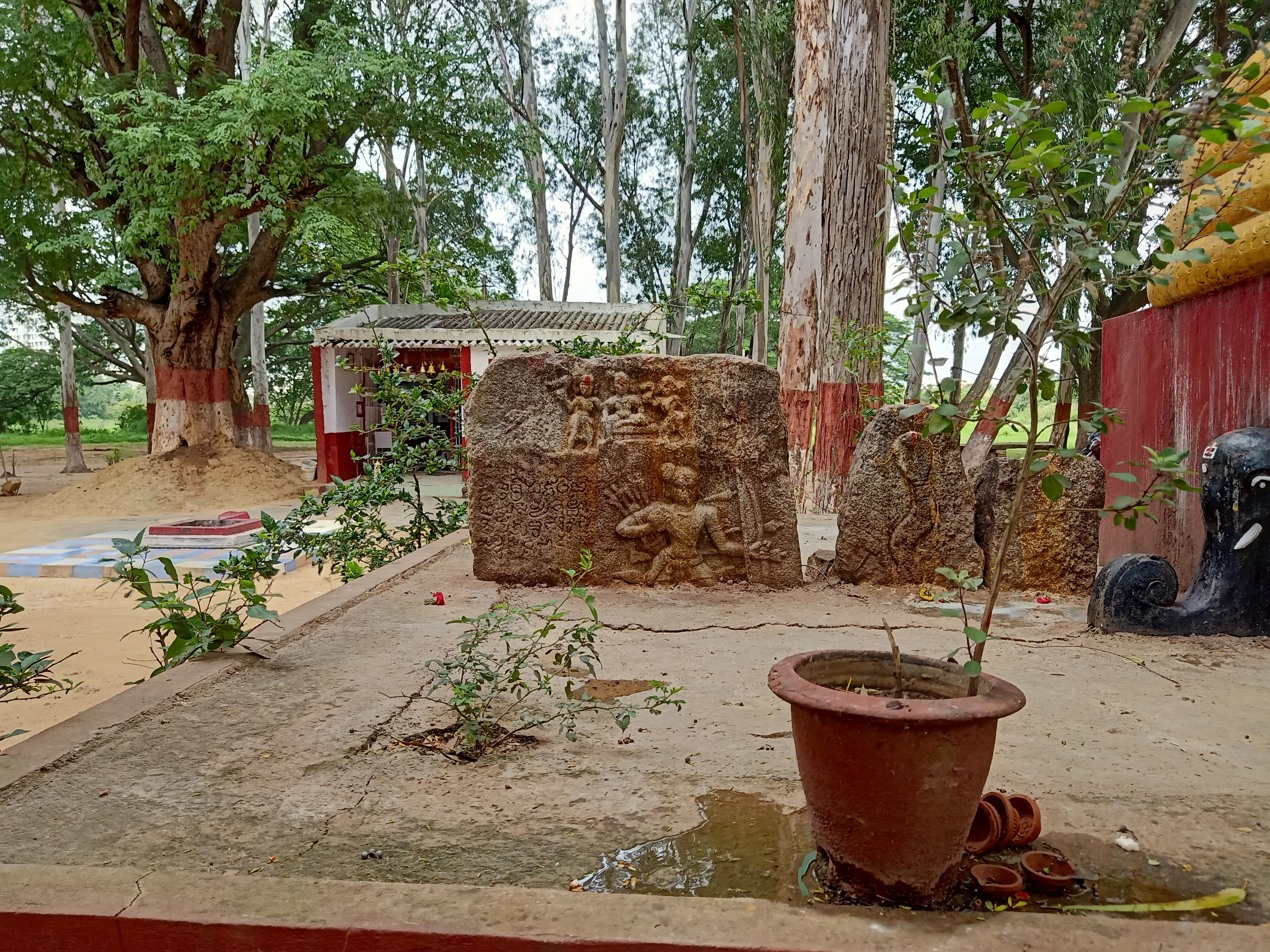
Srinivagilu 8th-century Palchtereyamma Herostone with inscription
