= Bhattiprolu script =

Variant of the Brahmi script

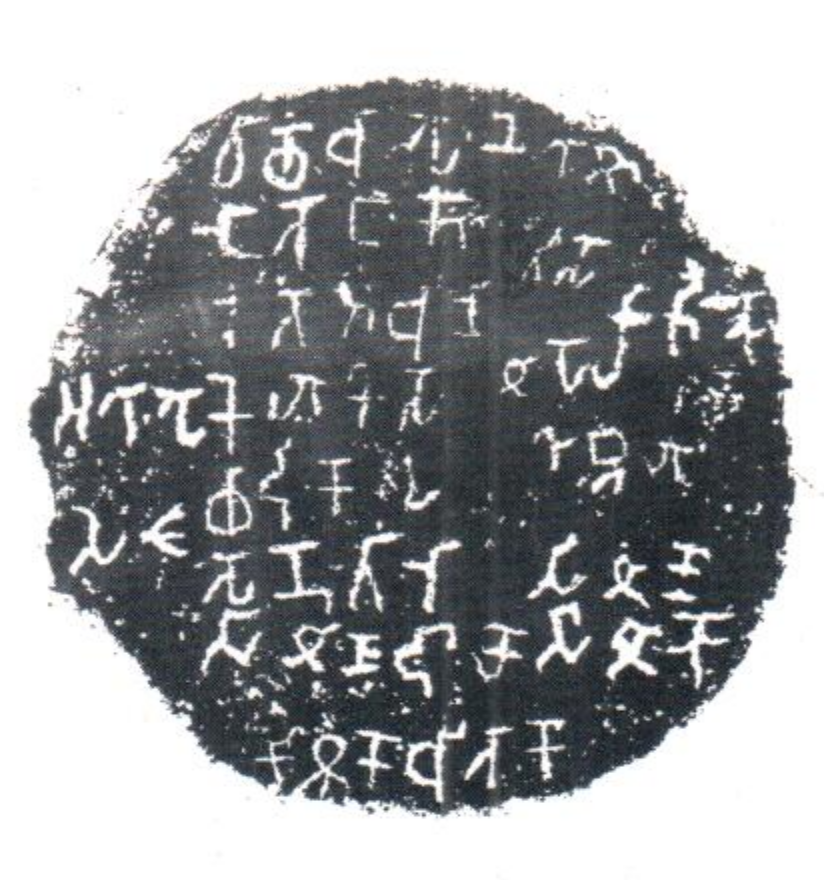
- The 6th stone inscription excavated at Bhattiprolu believed to be from 3rd century BCE
- Script type: Abugida
- Period: 3rd century-1st century BCE
- Languages: Prakrits

Related scripts
- Parent systems: Egyptian: Proto-Sinaitic; Phoenician; Aramaic; Brahmi; Bhattiprolu script
- Sister systems: Tamil-Brahmi; Kadamba script Gupta; Sinhala; Tocharian

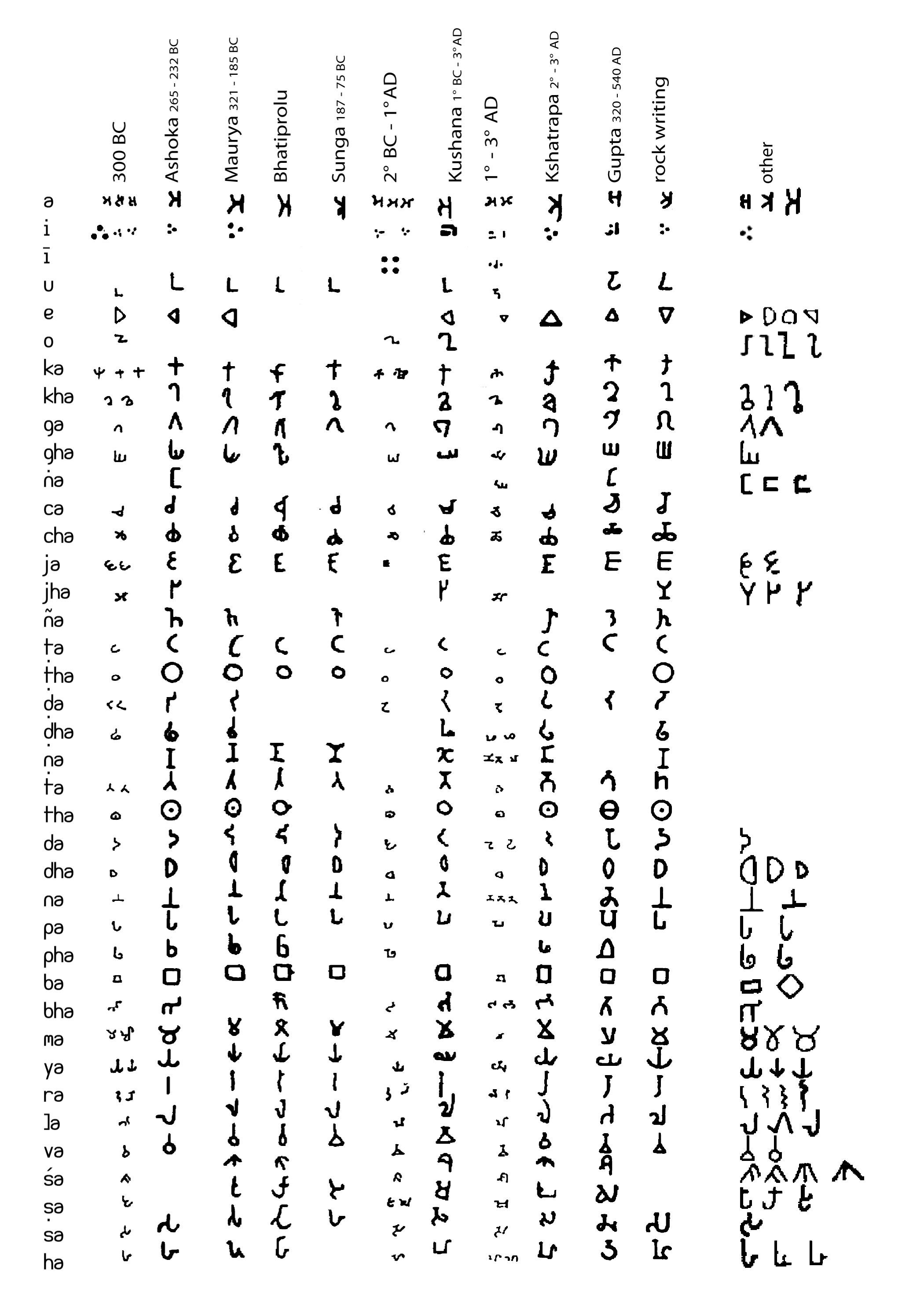
Bhattiprolu compared to other Brahmic scripts.

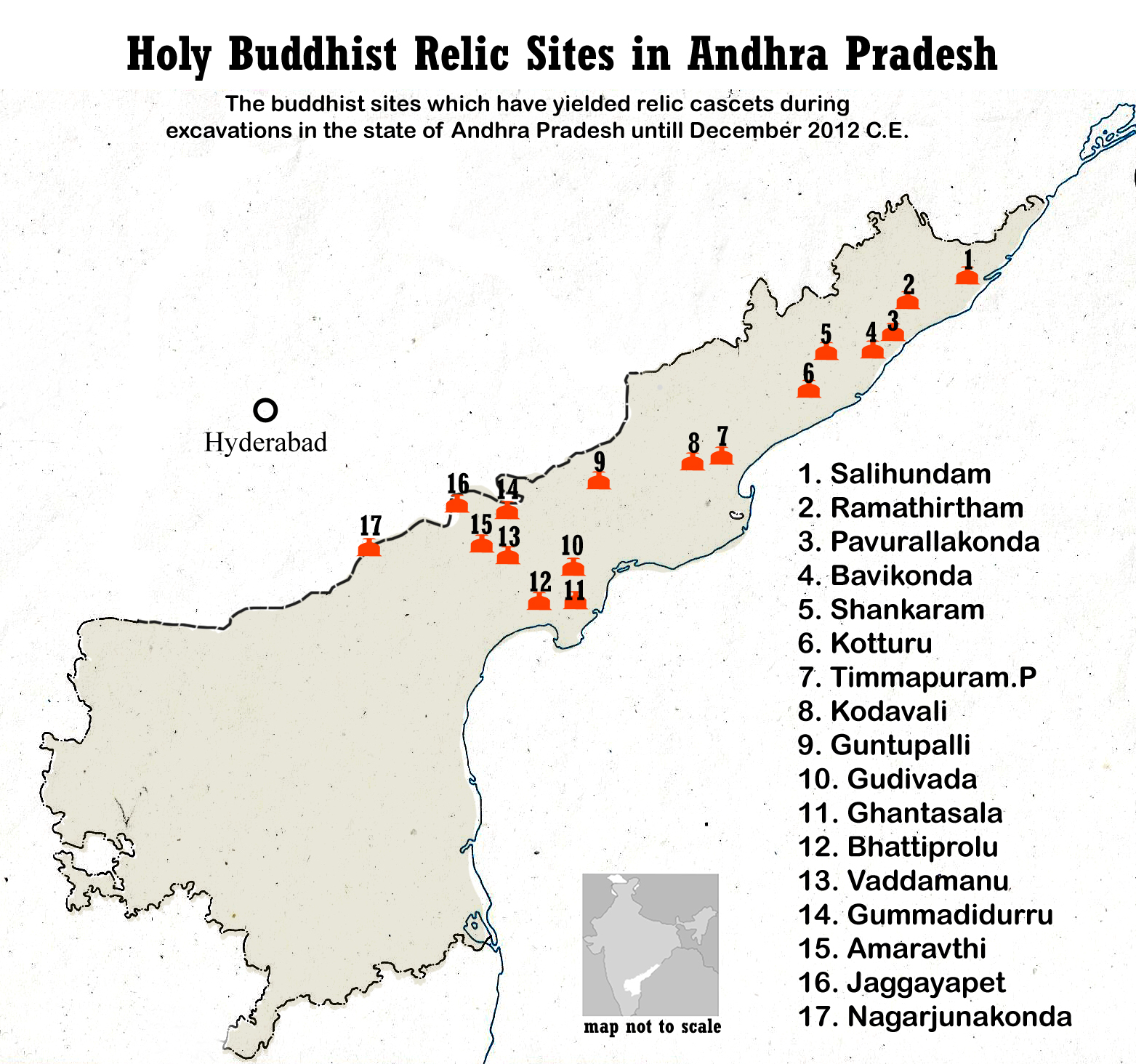
Bhattiprolu is a Holy relic site of Andhra Pradesh

The Bhattiprolu script is a variant of the Brahmi script which has been found in old inscriptions at Bhattiprolu, a small village in the erstwhile Guntur district of Andhra Pradesh, India. It is located in the fertile Krishna River delta and the estuary region where the river meets the Bay of Bengal.

The inscriptions date to between the 3rd and 1st centuries BCE, putting them among the earliest evidence of Brahmi writing in South India.

Bhattiprolu differs from Ashokan Brahmi in two significant ways. First, the letters gh, j, m, l, s are "radically different": m is upside-down compared to Brahmi, while gh appears to derive from g rather than from Semitic heth. Secondly, the inherent vowel has been discarded: A consonant written without diacritics represents the consonant alone. This is unique to Bhattiprolu among the early Indian scripts.

== Discovery ==
Excavations that started in the year 1870 by Boswell, Sir Walter Elliot, Robert Sewell, Alexander Rea, Buhler and continued in 1969 by R. Subrahmanyam revealed a complex of Buddhist stupas (an area of 1700 square yards, drum diameter of 148 feet, dome diameter of 132 feet, height of 40 feet and a circumambulatory path of 8 feet). Bricks of 45 x 30 x 8 cm dimensions were used for the construction.

Alexander Rea discovered three inscribed stone relic caskets containing crystal caskets, relics of Buddha and jewels in 1892.

The most significant discovery is the crystal relic casket of sārira-dhātu of the Buddha from the central mass of the stupas. The Mahachaitya (great stupa) remains of a large pillared hall, a large group of ruined votive stupas with several images of Buddha, a stone receptacle containing copper vessel, which in turn, contained two more, a silver casket and within it, a gold casket enclosing beads of bone and crystal were found.

== The script ==
The script was written on the urn containing Buddha's relics. Linguists surmise that the Mauryan Brahmi evolved in the 3rd century BCE and travelled soon after to Bhattiprolu. Twenty three symbols were identified in Bhattiprolu script. The symbols for 'ga' and 'sa' are similar to Mauryan Brahmi.

There are a total of nine inscriptions, all dated to the 2nd century BCE or possibly earlier (a tenth inscription is in a script much closer to standard Brahmi), written in Prakrit.

The Bhattiprolu inscription also shows systemic but not paleographic similarity to Tamil Brahmi. According to Richard Salomon, the Bhattiprolu script was originally invented to write a Dravidian language but was reapplied to inscribe in an Indo-Aryan Prakrit. Hence both the Bhattiprolu and Tamil Brahmi share common modifications to represent Dravidian languages. Bhattiprolu script is also considered the Rosetta Stone of Tamil Brahmi decipherment.

== See also ==
- Telugu-Kannada script
- Tamil Brahmi
- Kadamba script
- Gupta script
- Kalinga script
- Goykanadi
