= Kannada script =

Abugida writing system of the Brahmic family

Kannada script ಕನ್ನಡ ಲಿಪಿ
- A stanza from Kavirajamarga which praises the people for their literary skills, written in the Kannada script (Note: romanised: padanaṟidu nuḍiyaluṁ nuḍiduda naṟiyalumārparā nāḍavargaḷ cadurar nijadiṁ kuritōdadeyuṁ kāvyaprayōga pariṇatamatigaḷ)
- Script type: Abugida
- Period: 4th century CE – present
- Direction: Left-to-right
- Languages: Kannada; Sanskrit; Tulu; Kodava; Badaga; Beary; Sanketi; Konkani; Marathi

Related scripts
- Parent systems: Egyptian: Proto-Sinaitic; Phoenician; Aramaic (disputed); Brahmi script; Kadamba alphabet; Kannada-Telugu alphabet; Kannada script
- Child systems: Goykanadi
- Sister systems: Telugu

ISO 15924
- ISO 15924: Knda (345), Kannada

Unicode
- Unicode alias: Kannada
- Unicode range: U+0C80–U+0CFF

The Kannada script (IAST: Kannaḍa lipi; obsolete: Kanarese or Canarese script in English) is an abugida of the Brahmic family, used to write Kannada, one of the Dravidian languages of South India especially in the state of Karnataka. It is one of the official scripts of the Indian Republic. Kannada script is also widely used for writing Sanskrit texts in Karnataka. Several minor languages, such as Tulu, Konkani, Kodava, Beary and Sanketi also use alphabets based on the Kannada script. The Kannada and Telugu scripts share very high mutual intellegibility with each other, and are often considered to be regional variants of single script. Other scripts similar to Kannada script are Sinhala script (which included some elements from the Kadamba script), and Old Peguan script (used in Burma).

The Kannada script (ಅಕ್ಷರಮಾಲೆ akṣaramāle or ವರ್ಣಮಾಲೆ varṇamāle) is a phonemic abugida of forty-nine letters. The character set is almost identical to that of other Brahmic scripts or often known as Brahmi Lipi. Consonantal letters imply an inherent vowel. Letters representing consonants are combined to form digraphs (ಒತ್ತಕ್ಷರ ottakṣara) when there is no intervening vowel. Otherwise, each letter corresponds to a syllable.

The letters are classified into three categories: ಸ್ವರ svara (vowels), ವ್ಯಂಜನ vyañjana (consonants), and ಯೋಗವಾಹಕ yōgavāhaka (semiconsonants).

The Kannada words for a letter of the script are ಅಕ್ಷರ akshara, ಅಕ್ಕರ akkara, and ವರ್ಣ varṇa. Each letter has its own form (ಆಕಾರ ākāra) and sound (ಶಬ್ದ śabda), providing the visible and audible representations, respectively. Kannada is written from left to right.

== History ==
Kannada script or the early Kadamba script evolved from the Ashokan Brahmi script, which later evolved into Kannada-Telugu script, during the period of Chalukyas and later Chalukyas of Vengi. The Kannada and Telugu scripts then separated by around 1300 C.E.

The 11th-century Persian scholar and polymath Al-Biruni calls the Kannada script as Karnata alphabets used in Karnatadesa.

Over the centuries some changes have been made to the Kannada script. These changes consist of:

1. Modification of existing glyphs: In the early Kannada script, no orthographic distinction was made between the short mid [e, o] ಎ, ಒ and long mid [eː, oː] ಏ, ಓ. However, distinct signs were employed to denote the special consonants viz. the trill [r] ಱ the retroflex lateral [ɭ] ಳ and the retroflex rhotic [ɻ] ೞ, by the 5th century.

== Vowels ==
There are thirteen vowel letters (ಸ್ವರ svara) in modern Kannada. The Kannada script is an abugida, where when a vowel follows a consonant, it is written with a diacritic rather than as a separate letter. There are also three obsolete vowels, corresponding to vowels in Sanskrit.

Written Kannada is composed of akshara or kagunita, corresponding to syllables. The letters for consonants combine with diacritics for vowels. The consonant letter without any diacritic, such as ಕ ka, has the inherent vowel a ಅ. A consonant without a vowel is marked with a 'killer' stroke, such as ಕ್ k. This silencing diacritic and process is known as ಹಲಂತ halanta, whereas the resulting letter is called an ಅರ್ಧಾಕ್ಷರ ardhākshara (lit. 'half letter').

Kannada has a phonemic vowel length distinction, so like many other Brahmic scripts, the writing system has two sets of diacritics, one for short vowels and one for long vowels. Short vowels are referred to as ಹ್ರಸ್ವ hrasva, while long vowels are referred to as ದೀರ್ಘ dīrgha.

Vowels with their corresponding diacritics and akshara with ಅ
Independent	ಅ a	ಆ ā	ಇ i	ಈ ī	ಉ u	ಊ ū	ಋ r̥	ೠ r̥̄ (Note: Obsolete in modern Kannada.)	ಌ l̥	ೡ l̥̄	ಎ e	ಏ ē	ಐ ai	ಒ o	ಓ ō	ಔ au
Diacritic template	- a	ಾ ā	ಿ i	ೀ ī	ು u	ೂ ū	ೃ r̥	ೄ r̥̄	ೢ l̥	ೣ l̥̄	ೆ e	ೇ ē	ೈ ai	ೊ o	ೋ ō	ೌ au
Diacritic with ದ	ದ + ದ IPA: /d̪a/	ದ + ಾ ದಾ IPA: /d̪aː/	ದ + ಿ ದಿ IPA: /d̪i/	ದ + ೀ ದೀ IPA: /d̪iː/	ದ + ು ದು IPA: /d̪u/	ದ + ೂ ದೂ IPA: /d̪uː/	ದ + ೃ ದೃ IPA: /d̪ru/	ದ + ೄ ದೄ IPA: /d̪ruː/	ದ + ೢ ದೢ IPA: /d̪ruː/	ದ + ೣ ದೣ IPA: /d̪ruː/	ದ + ೆ ದೆ IPA: /d̪e/	ದ + ೇ ದೇ IPA: /d̪eː/	ದ + ೈ ದೈ IPA: /dai/	ದ + ೊ ದೊ IPA: /d̪o/	ದ + ೋ ದೋ IPA: /d̪oː/	ದ + ೌ ದೌ IPA: /d̪au/

=== Yōgavāha ===
There are two yōgavāha (part-vowel, part consonant) letters, known as ardhavisarga, used in modern Kannada and two others used in Sanskrit transcription.

yōgavāha with their corresponding diacritics and akshara with ಅ and ದ
Diacritic template	ಂ ṁ	ಃ ḥ	ೱ ḥ (Note: Not used in modern Kannada, but used in Sanskrit transcription.)	ೲ ḫ
Diacritic with ಅ	ಅಂ aṁ	ಅಃ aḥ	ಅೱ ḥ	ಅೲ ḫ
Diacritic with ದ	ದ + ಂ ದಂ IPA: /d̪am̃/	ದ + ಃ ದಃ IPA: /d̪ah/	ದ + ೱ ದೱ IPA: [x] (Note: Changes the sound of ಕ from k to kh.)	ದ + ೲ ದೲ IPA: [ɸ] (Note: Changes the sound of ಪ from p to ph, similar to the f in fan but without the lips touching the teeth.)

== Consonant letters ==
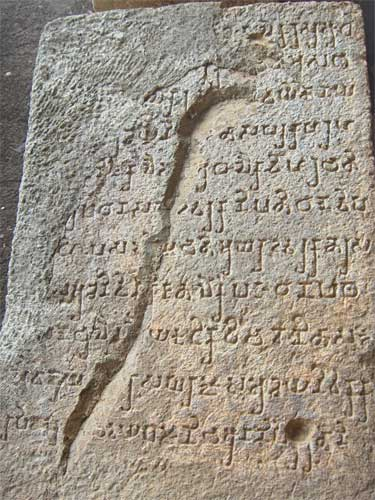
Brahmi script, Kanheri Caves

Two categories of consonant letters (ವ್ಯಂಜನ vyan̄jana) are defined in Kannada: the structured consonants and the unstructured consonants.

=== Structured consonants ===
The structured consonants are classified according to their place of articulation, that is, where the tongue touches the palate.

Structured consonants
	voiceless	voiceless aspirated	voiced	voiced aspirated	Nasal
velar - throat	ಕ್ಕ ka	ಖ್ಖ kha	ಗ್ಗ ga	ಘ್ಘ gha	ಙ್ಙ ṅa
palatal - middle of the mouth	ಚ್ಚ ca	ಛ್ಛ cha	ಜ್ಜ ja	ಝ್ಝ jha	ಞ್ಞ ña
retroflex - roof of the mouth	ಟ್ಟ ṭa	ಠ್ಠ ṭha	ಡ್ಡ ḍa	ಢ್ಢ ḍha	ಣ್ಣ ṇa
dental - teeth	ತ್ತ ta	ಥ್ಥ tha	ದ್ದ da	ಧ್ಧ dha	ನ್ನ na
labial - lips	ಪ್ಪ pa	ಫ್ಫ pha	ಬ್ಬ ba	ಭ್ಭ bha	ಮ್ಮ ma

=== Unstructured consonants ===
The unstructured consonants are consonants that do not fall into any of the above structures:

Unstructured consonants
ಯ್ಯ ya	ರ್ರ ra	ಱ್ಱ ṟa (Note: Obsolete in modern Kannada.)	ಲ್ಲ la	ವ್ವ va	ಶ್ಶ śa	ಷ್ಷ ṣa	ಸ್ಸ sa	ಹ್ಹ ha	ಳ್ಳ ḷa	ೞ್ೞ ḻa

=== Obsolete Kannada letters ===
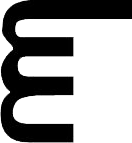
Historical form of representing ನ್ in Kannada script.

Kannada literary works employed the letters ಱ (transliterated 'ṟ' or 'rh') and ೞ (transliterated 'ḻ', 'lh' or 'zh'), whose manner of articulation most plausibly could be akin to those in present-day Malayalam and Tamil. The letters dropped out of use in the 12th and 18th centuries, respectively. Later Kannada works replaced 'rh' and 'lh' with ರ (ra) and ಳ (la) respectively.

It is still used to write the Badaga language and a vowel + virama + ḻ is used to transcribe its retroflex vowels.

Another letter (or unclassified vyanjana (consonant)) that has become extinct is 'nh' or 'inn'. Likewise, this has its equivalent in Telugu, where it is called Nakaara pollu. The usage of this consonant was observed until the 1980s in Kannada works from the mostly coastal areas of Karnataka (especially the Dakshina Kannada district). Now, hardly any mainstream works use this consonant. This letter has been replaced by ನ್ (consonant n).

=== Consonant conjuncts ===
The Kannada script is rich in conjunct consonant clusters, with most consonants having a standard subjoined form and few true ligature clusters. A table of consonant conjuncts follows although the forms of individual conjuncts may differ according to the font.

Of special note is the sequence concerning the letter ರ (ra). Unlike other letters, the conjunct form called arkaavotthu ಅರ್ಕಾವೊತ್ತು is written second even if it is pronounced first in the sequence.

For example, the /rnaː/ in the word Karnāṭaka (ಕರ್ನಾಟಕ) is written ರ್ನಾ rather than ರ‍್ನಾ.

The nasal consonants ಙ (ṅa), ಞ (ña), ಣ (ṇa), ನ (na), and ಮ (ma) are usually written as an anusvara ಂ when preceding another consonant rather than a consonant conjunct.

For example, the /ŋg/ in the word Beṅgaḷūru (ಬೆಂಗಳೂರು) is usually written ಂಗ rather than ಙ್ಗ (ಬೆಙ್ಗಳೂರು).

=== Complete list of consonant conjuncts ===
Kannada Consonant Conjuncts
	ಕ	ಖ	ಗ	ಘ	ಙ	ಚ	ಛ	ಜ	ಝ	ಞ	ಟ	ಠ	ಡ	ಢ	ಣ	ತ	ಥ	ದ	ಧ	ನ	ಪ	ಫ	ಬ	ಭ	ಮ	ಯ	ರ	ಱ	ಲ	ವ	ಶ	ಷ	ಸ	ಹ	ಳ	ೞ
ಕ	ಕ್ಕ	ಕ್ಖ	ಕ್ಗ	ಕ್ಘ	ಕ್ಙ	ಕ್ಚ	ಕ್ಛ	ಕ್ಜ	ಕ್ಝ	ಕ್ಞ	ಕ್ಟ	ಕ್ಠ	ಕ್ಡ	ಕ್ಢ	ಕ್ಣ	ಕ್ತ	ಕ್ಥ	ಕ್ದ	ಕ್ಧ	ಕ್ನ	ಕ್ಪ	ಕ್ಫ	ಕ್ಬ	ಕ್ಭ	ಕ್ಮ	ಕ್ಯ	ಕ್ರ	ಕ್ಱ	ಕ್ಲ	ಕ್ವ	ಕ್ಶ	ಕ್ಷ	ಕ್ಸ	ಕ್ಹ	ಕ್ಳ	ಕ್ೞ
ಖ	ಖ್ಕ	ಖ್ಖ	ಖ್ಗ	ಖ್ಘ	ಖ್ಙ	ಖ್ಚ	ಖ್ಛ	ಖ್ಜ	ಖ್ಝ	ಖ್ಞ	ಖ್ಟ	ಖ್ಠ	ಖ್ಡ	ಖ್ಢ	ಖ್ಣ	ಖ್ತ	ಖ್ಥ	ಖ್ದ	ಖ್ಧ	ಖ್ನ	ಖ್ಪ	ಖ್ಫ	ಖ್ಬ	ಖ್ಭ	ಖ್ಮ	ಖ್ಯ	ಖ್ರ	ಖ್ಱ	ಖ್ಲ	ಖ್ವ	ಖ್ಶ	ಖ್ಷ	ಖ್ಸ	ಖ್ಹ	ಖ್ಳ	ಖ್ೞ
ಗ	ಗ್ಕ	ಗ್ಖ	ಗ್ಗ	ಗ್ಘ	ಗ್ಙ	ಗ್ಚ	ಗ್ಛ	ಗ್ಜ	ಗ್ಝ	ಗ್ಞ	ಗ್ಟ	ಗ್ಠ	ಗ್ಡ	ಗ್ಢ	ಗ್ಣ	ಗ್ತ	ಗ್ಥ	ಗ್ದ	ಗ್ಧ	ಗ್ನ	ಗ್ಪ	ಗ್ಫ	ಗ್ಬ	ಗ್ಭ	ಗ್ಮ	ಗ್ಯ	ಗ್ರ	ಗ್ಱ	ಗ್ಲ	ಗ್ವ	ಗ್ಶ	ಗ್ಷ	ಗ್ಸ	ಗ್ಹ	ಗ್ಳ	ಗ್ೞ
ಘ	ಘ್ಕ	ಘ್ಖ	ಘ್ಗ	ಘ್ಘ	ಘ್ಙ	ಘ್ಚ	ಘ್ಛ	ಘ್ಜ	ಘ್ಝ	ಘ್ಞ	ಘ್ಟ	ಘ್ಠ	ಘ್ಡ	ಘ್ಢ	ಘ್ಣ	ಘ್ತ	ಘ್ಥ	ಘ್ದ	ಘ್ಧ	ಘ್ನ	ಘ್ಪ	ಘ್ಫ	ಘ್ಬ	ಘ್ಭ	ಘ್ಮ	ಘ್ಯ	ಘ್ರ	ಘ್ಱ	ಘ್ಲ	ಘ್ವ	ಘ್ಶ	ಘ್ಷ	ಘ್ಸ	ಘ್ಹ	ಘ್ಳ	ಘ್ೞ
ಙ	ಙ್ಕ	ಙ್ಖ	ಙ್ಗ	ಙ್ಘ	ಙ್ಙ	ಙ್ಚ	ಙ್ಛ	ಙ್ಜ	ಙ್ಝ	ಙ್ಞ	ಙ್ಟ	ಙ್ಠ	ಙ್ಡ	ಙ್ಢ	ಙ್ಣ	ಙ್ತ	ಙ್ಥ	ಙ್ದ	ಙ್ಧ	ಙ್ನ	ಙ್ಪ	ಙ್ಫ	ಙ್ಬ	ಙ್ಭ	ಙ್ಮ	ಙ್ಯ	ಙ್ರ	ಙ್ಱ	ಙ್ಲ	ಙ್ವ	ಙ್ಶ	ಙ್ಷ	ಙ್ಸ	ಙ್ಹ	ಙ್ಳ	ಙ್ೞ
ಚ	ಚ್ಕ	ಚ್ಖ	ಚ್ಗ	ಚ್ಘ	ಚ್ಙ	ಚ್ಚ	ಚ್ಛ	ಚ್ಜ	ಚ್ಝ	ಚ್ಞ	ಚ್ಟ	ಚ್ಠ	ಚ್ಡ	ಚ್ಢ	ಚ್ಣ	ಚ್ತ	ಚ್ಥ	ಚ್ದ	ಚ್ಧ	ಚ್ನ	ಚ್ಪ	ಚ್ಫ	ಚ್ಬ	ಚ್ಭ	ಚ್ಮ	ಚ್ಯ	ಚ್ರ	ಚ್ಱ	ಚ್ಲ	ಚ್ವ	ಚ್ಶ	ಚ್ಷ	ಚ್ಸ	ಚ್ಹ	ಚ್ಳ	ಚ್ೞ
ಛ	ಛ್ಕ	ಛ್ಖ	ಛ್ಗ	ಛ್ಘ	ಛ್ಙ	ಛ್ಚ	ಛ್ಛ	ಛ್ಜ	ಛ್ಝ	ಛ್ಞ	ಛ್ಟ	ಛ್ಠ	ಛ್ಡ	ಛ್ಢ	ಛ್ಣ	ಛ್ತ	ಛ್ಥ	ಛ್ದ	ಛ್ಧ	ಛ್ನ	ಛ್ಪ	ಛ್ಫ	ಛ್ಬ	ಛ್ಭ	ಛ್ಮ	ಛ್ಯ	ಛ್ರ	ಛ್ಱ	ಛ್ಲ	ಛ್ವ	ಛ್ಶ	ಛ್ಷ	ಛ್ಸ	ಛ್ಹ	ಛ್ಳ	ಛ್ೞ
ಜ	ಜ್ಕ	ಜ್ಖ	ಜ್ಗ	ಜ್ಘ	ಜ್ಙ	ಜ್ಚ	ಜ್ಛ	ಜ್ಜ	ಜ್ಝ	ಜ್ಞ	ಜ್ಟ	ಜ್ಠ	ಜ್ಡ	ಜ್ಢ	ಜ್ಣ	ಜ್ತ	ಜ್ಥ	ಜ್ದ	ಜ್ಧ	ಜ್ನ	ಜ್ಪ	ಜ್ಫ	ಜ್ಬ	ಜ್ಭ	ಜ್ಮ	ಜ್ಯ	ಜ್ರ	ಜ್ಱ	ಜ್ಲ	ಜ್ವ	ಜ್ಶ	ಜ್ಷ	ಜ್ಸ	ಜ್ಹ	ಜ್ಳ	ಜ್ೞ
ಝ	ಝ್ಕ	ಝ್ಖ	ಝ್ಗ	ಝ್ಘ	ಝ್ಙ	ಝ್ಚ	ಝ್ಛ	ಝ್ಜ	ಝ್ಝ	ಝ್ಞ	ಝ್ಟ	ಝ್ಠ	ಝ್ಡ	ಝ್ಢ	ಝ್ಣ	ಝ್ತ	ಝ್ಥ	ಝ್ದ	ಝ್ಧ	ಝ್ನ	ಝ್ಪ	ಝ್ಫ	ಝ್ಬ	ಝ್ಭ	ಝ್ಮ	ಝ್ಯ	ಝ್ರ	ಝ್ಱ	ಝ್ಲ	ಝ್ವ	ಝ್ಶ	ಝ್ಷ	ಝ್ಸ	ಝ್ಹ	ಝ್ಳ	ಝ್ೞ
ಞ	ಞ್ಕ	ಞ್ಖ	ಞ್ಗ	ಞ್ಘ	ಞ್ಙ	ಞ್ಚ	ಞ್ಛ	ಞ್ಜ	ಞ್ಝ	ಞ್ಞ	ಞ್ಟ	ಞ್ಠ	ಞ್ಡ	ಞ್ಢ	ಞ್ಣ	ಞ್ತ	ಞ್ಥ	ಞ್ದ	ಞ್ಧ	ಞ್ನ	ಞ್ಪ	ಞ್ಫ	ಞ್ಬ	ಞ್ಭ	ಞ್ಮ	ಞ್ಯ	ಞ್ರ	ಞ್ಱ	ಞ್ಲ	ಞ್ವ	ಞ್ಶ	ಞ್ಷ	ಞ್ಸ	ಞ್ಹ	ಞ್ಳ	ಞ್ೞ
ಟ	ಟ್ಕ	ಟ್ಖ	ಟ್ಗ	ಟ್ಘ	ಟ್ಙ	ಟ್ಚ	ಟ್ಛ	ಟ್ಜ	ಟ್ಝ	ಟ್ಞ	ಟ್ಟ	ಟ್ಠ	ಟ್ಡ	ಟ್ಢ	ಟ್ಣ	ಟ್ತ	ಟ್ಥ	ಟ್ದ	ಟ್ಧ	ಟ್ನ	ಟ್ಪ	ಟ್ಫ	ಟ್ಬ	ಟ್ಭ	ಟ್ಮ	ಟ್ಯ	ಟ್ರ	ಟ್ಱ	ಟ್ಲ	ಟ್ವ	ಟ್ಶ	ಟ್ಷ	ಟ್ಸ	ಟ್ಹ	ಟ್ಳ	ಟ್ೞ
ಠ	ಠ್ಕ	ಠ್ಖ	ಠ್ಗ	ಠ್ಘ	ಠ್ಙ	ಠ್ಚ	ಠ್ಛ	ಠ್ಜ	ಠ್ಝ	ಠ್ಞ	ಠ್ಟ	ಠ್ಠ	ಠ್ಡ	ಠ್ಢ	ಠ್ಣ	ಠ್ತ	ಠ್ಥ	ಠ್ದ	ಠ್ಧ	ಠ್ನ	ಠ್ಪ	ಠ್ಫ	ಠ್ಬ	ಠ್ಭ	ಠ್ಮ	ಠ್ಯ	ಠ್ರ	ಠ್ಱ	ಠ್ಲ	ಠ್ವ	ಠ್ಶ	ಠ್ಷ	ಠ್ಸ	ಠ್ಹ	ಠ್ಳ	ಠ್ೞ
ಡ	ಡ್ಕ	ಡ್ಖ	ಡ್ಗ	ಡ್ಘ	ಡ್ಙ	ಡ್ಚ	ಡ್ಛ	ಡ್ಜ	ಡ್ಝ	ಡ್ಞ	ಡ್ಟ	ಡ್ಠ	ಡ್ಡ	ಡ್ಢ	ಡ್ಣ	ಡ್ತ	ಡ್ಥ	ಡ್ದ	ಡ್ಧ	ಡ್ನ	ಡ್ಪ	ಡ್ಫ	ಡ್ಬ	ಡ್ಭ	ಡ್ಮ	ಡ್ಯ	ಡ್ರ	ಡ್ಱ	ಡ್ಲ	ಡ್ವ	ಡ್ಶ	ಡ್ಷ	ಡ್ಸ	ಡ್ಹ	ಡ್ಳ	ಡ್ೞ
ಢ	ಢ್ಕ	ಢ್ಖ	ಢ್ಗ	ಢ್ಘ	ಢ್ಙ	ಢ್ಚ	ಢ್ಛ	ಢ್ಜ	ಢ್ಝ	ಢ್ಞ	ಢ್ಟ	ಢ್ಠ	ಢ್ಡ	ಢ್ಢ	ಢ್ಣ	ಢ್ತ	ಢ್ಥ	ಢ್ದ	ಢ್ಧ	ಢ್ನ	ಢ್ಪ	ಢ್ಫ	ಢ್ಬ	ಢ್ಭ	ಢ್ಮ	ಢ್ಯ	ಢ್ರ	ಢ್ಱ	ಢ್ಲ	ಢ್ವ	ಢ್ಶ	ಢ್ಷ	ಢ್ಸ	ಢ್ಹ	ಢ್ಳ	ಢ್ೞ
ಣ	ಣ್ಕ	ಣ್ಖ	ಣ್ಗ	ಣ್ಘ	ಣ್ಙ	ಣ್ಚ	ಣ್ಛ	ಣ್ಜ	ಣ್ಝ	ಣ್ಞ	ಣ್ಟ	ಣ್ಠ	ಣ್ಡ	ಣ್ಢ	ಣ್ಣ	ಣ್ತ	ಣ್ಥ	ಣ್ದ	ಣ್ಧ	ಣ್ನ	ಣ್ಪ	ಣ್ಫ	ಣ್ಬ	ಣ್ಭ	ಣ್ಮ	ಣ್ಯ	ಣ್ರ	ಣ್ಱ	ಣ್ಲ	ಣ್ವ	ಣ್ಶ	ಣ್ಷ	ಣ್ಸ	ಣ್ಹ	ಣ್ಳ	ಣ್ೞ
ತ	ತ್ಕ	ತ್ಖ	ತ್ಗ	ತ್ಘ	ತ್ಙ	ತ್ಚ	ತ್ಛ	ತ್ಜ	ತ್ಝ	ತ್ಞ	ತ್ಟ	ತ್ಠ	ತ್ಡ	ತ್ಢ	ತ್ಣ	ತ್ತ	ತ್ಥ	ತ್ದ	ತ್ಧ	ತ್ನ	ತ್ಪ	ತ್ಫ	ತ್ಬ	ತ್ಭ	ತ್ಮ	ತ್ಯ	ತ್ರ	ತ್ಱ	ತ್ಲ	ತ್ವ	ತ್ಶ	ತ್ಷ	ತ್ಸ	ತ್ಹ	ತ್ಳ	ತ್ೞ
ಥ	ಥ್ಕ	ಥ್ಖ	ಥ್ಗ	ಥ್ಘ	ಥ್ಙ	ಥ್ಚ	ಥ್ಛ	ಥ್ಜ	ಥ್ಝ	ಥ್ಞ	ಥ್ಟ	ಥ್ಠ	ಥ್ಡ	ಥ್ಢ	ಥ್ಣ	ಥ್ತ	ಥ್ಥ	ಥ್ದ	ಥ್ಧ	ಥ್ನ	ಥ್ಪ	ಥ್ಫ	ಥ್ಬ	ಥ್ಭ	ಥ್ಮ	ಥ್ಯ	ಥ್ರ	ಥ್ಱ	ಥ್ಲ	ಥ್ವ	ಥ್ಶ	ಥ್ಷ	ಥ್ಸ	ಥ್ಹ	ಥ್ಳ	ಥ್ೞ
ದ	ದ್ಕ	ದ್ಖ	ದ್ಗ	ದ್ಘ	ದ್ಙ	ದ್ಚ	ದ್ಛ	ದ್ಜ	ದ್ಝ	ದ್ಞ	ದ್ಟ	ದ್ಠ	ದ್ಡ	ದ್ಢ	ದ್ಣ	ದ್ತ	ದ್ಥ	ದ್ದ	ದ್ಧ	ದ್ನ	ದ್ಪ	ದ್ಫ	ದ್ಬ	ದ್ಭ	ದ್ಮ	ದ್ಯ	ದ್ರ	ದ್ಱ	ದ್ಲ	ದ್ವ	ದ್ಶ	ದ್ಷ	ದ್ಸ	ದ್ಹ	ದ್ಳ	ದ್ೞ
ಧ	ಧ್ಕ	ಧ್ಖ	ಧ್ಗ	ಧ್ಘ	ಧ್ಙ	ಧ್ಚ	ಧ್ಛ	ಧ್ಜ	ಧ್ಝ	ಧ್ಞ	ಧ್ಟ	ಧ್ಠ	ಧ್ಡ	ಧ್ಢ	ಧ್ಣ	ಧ್ತ	ಧ್ಥ	ಧ್ದ	ಧ್ಧ	ಧ್ನ	ಧ್ಪ	ಧ್ಫ	ಧ್ಬ	ಧ್ಭ	ಧ್ಮ	ಧ್ಯ	ಧ್ರ	ಧ್ಱ	ಧ್ಲ	ಧ್ವ	ಧ್ಶ	ಧ್ಷ	ಧ್ಸ	ಧ್ಹ	ಧ್ಳ	ಧ್ೞ
ನ	ನ್ಕ	ನ್ಖ	ನ್ಗ	ನ್ಘ	ನ್ಙ	ನ್ಚ	ನ್ಛ	ನ್ಜ	ನ್ಝ	ನ್ಞ	ನ್ಟ	ನ್ಠ	ನ್ಡ	ನ್ಢ	ನ್ಣ	ನ್ತ	ನ್ಥ	ನ್ದ	ನ್ಧ	ನ್ನ	ನ್ಪ	ನ್ಫ	ನ್ಬ	ನ್ಭ	ನ್ಮ	ನ್ಯ	ನ್ರ	ನ್ಱ	ನ್ಲ	ನ್ವ	ನ್ಶ	ನ್ಷ	ನ್ಸ	ನ್ಹ	ನ್ಳ	ನ್ೞ
ಪ	ಪ್ಕ	ಪ್ಖ	ಪ್ಗ	ಪ್ಘ	ಪ್ಙ	ಪ್ಚ	ಪ್ಛ	ಪ್ಜ	ಪ್ಝ	ಪ್ಞ	ಪ್ಟ	ಪ್ಠ	ಪ್ಡ	ಪ್ಢ	ಪ್ಣ	ಪ್ತ	ಪ್ಥ	ಪ್ದ	ಪ್ಧ	ಪ್ನ	ಪ್ಪ	ಪ್ಫ	ಪ್ಬ	ಪ್ಭ	ಪ್ಮ	ಪ್ಯ	ಪ್ರ	ಪ್ಱ	ಪ್ಲ	ಪ್ವ	ಪ್ಶ	ಪ್ಷ	ಪ್ಸ	ಪ್ಹ	ಪ್ಳ	ಪ್ೞ
ಫ	ಫ್ಕ	ಫ್ಖ	ಫ್ಗ	ಫ್ಘ	ಫ್ಙ	ಫ್ಚ	ಫ್ಛ	ಫ್ಜ	ಫ್ಝ	ಫ್ಞ	ಫ್ಟ	ಫ್ಠ	ಫ್ಡ	ಫ್ಢ	ಫ್ಣ	ಫ್ತ	ಫ್ಥ	ಫ್ದ	ಫ್ಧ	ಫ್ನ	ಫ್ಪ	ಫ್ಫ	ಫ್ಬ	ಫ್ಭ	ಫ್ಮ	ಫ್ಯ	ಫ್ರ	ಫ್ಱ	ಫ್ಲ	ಫ್ವ	ಫ್ಶ	ಫ್ಷ	ಫ್ಸ	ಫ್ಹ	ಫ್ಳ	ಫ್ೞ
ಬ	ಬ್ಕ	ಬ್ಖ	ಬ್ಗ	ಬ್ಘ	ಬ್ಙ	ಬ್ಚ	ಬ್ಛ	ಬ್ಜ	ಬ್ಝ	ಬ್ಞ	ಬ್ಟ	ಬ್ಠ	ಬ್ಡ	ಬ್ಢ	ಬ್ಣ	ಬ್ತ	ಬ್ಥ	ಬ್ದ	ಬ್ಧ	ಬ್ನ	ಬ್ಪ	ಬ್ಫ	ಬ್ಬ	ಬ್ಭ	ಬ್ಮ	ಬ್ಯ	ಬ್ರ	ಬ್ಱ	ಬ್ಲ	ಬ್ವ	ಬ್ಶ	ಬ್ಷ	ಬ್ಸ	ಬ್ಹ	ಬ್ಳ	ಬ್ೞ
ಭ	ಭ್ಕ	ಭ್ಖ	ಭ್ಗ	ಭ್ಘ	ಭ್ಙ	ಭ್ಚ	ಭ್ಛ	ಭ್ಜ	ಭ್ಝ	ಭ್ಞ	ಭ್ಟ	ಭ್ಠ	ಭ್ಡ	ಭ್ಢ	ಭ್ಣ	ಭ್ತ	ಭ್ಥ	ಭ್ದ	ಭ್ಧ	ಭ್ನ	ಭ್ಪ	ಭ್ಫ	ಭ್ಬ	ಭ್ಭ	ಭ್ಮ	ಭ್ಯ	ಭ್ರ	ಭ್ಱ	ಭ್ಲ	ಭ್ವ	ಭ್ಶ	ಭ್ಷ	ಭ್ಸ	ಭ್ಹ	ಭ್ಳ	ಭ್ೞ
ಮ	ಮ್ಕ	ಮ್ಖ	ಮ್ಗ	ಮ್ಘ	ಮ್ಙ	ಮ್ಚ	ಮ್ಛ	ಮ್ಜ	ಮ್ಝ	ಮ್ಞ	ಮ್ಟ	ಮ್ಠ	ಮ್ಡ	ಮ್ಢ	ಮ್ಣ	ಮ್ತ	ಮ್ಥ	ಮ್ದ	ಮ್ಧ	ಮ್ನ	ಮ್ಪ	ಮ್ಫ	ಮ್ಬ	ಮ್ಭ	ಮ್ಮ	ಮ್ಯ	ಮ್ರ	ಮ್ಱ	ಮ್ಲ	ಮ್ವ	ಮ್ಶ	ಮ್ಷ	ಮ್ಸ	ಮ್ಹ	ಮ್ಳ	ಮ್ೞ
ಯ	ಯ್ಕ	ಯ್ಖ	ಯ್ಗ	ಯ್ಘ	ಯ್ಙ	ಯ್ಚ	ಯ್ಛ	ಯ್ಜ	ಯ್ಝ	ಯ್ಞ	ಯ್ಟ	ಯ್ಠ	ಯ್ಡ	ಯ್ಢ	ಯ್ಣ	ಯ್ತ	ಯ್ಥ	ಯ್ದ	ಯ್ಧ	ಯ್ನ	ಯ್ಪ	ಯ್ಫ	ಯ್ಬ	ಯ್ಭ	ಯ್ಮ	ಯ್ಯ	ಯ್ರ	ಯ್ಱ	ಯ್ಲ	ಯ್ವ	ಯ್ಶ	ಯ್ಷ	ಯ್ಸ	ಯ್ಹ	ಯ್ಳ	ಯ್ೞ
ರ	**ರ್ಕ**	**ರ್ಖ**	**ರ್ಗ**	**ರ್ಘ**	**ರ್ಙ**	**ರ್ಚ**	**ರ್ಛ**	**ರ್ಜ**	**ರ್ಝ**	**ರ್ಞ**	**ರ್ಟ**	**ರ್ಠ**	**ರ್ಡ**	**ರ್ಢ**	**ರ್ಣ**	**ರ್ತ**	**ರ್ಥ**	**ರ್ದ**	**ರ್ಧ**	**ರ್ನ**	**ರ್ಪ**	**ರ್ಫ**	**ರ್ಬ**	**ರ್ಭ**	**ರ್ಮ**	**ರ್ಯ**	ರ್ರ	**ರ್ಱ**	**ರ್ಲ**	**ರ್ವ**	**ರ್ಶ**	**ರ್ಷ**	**ರ್ಸ**	**ರ್ಹ**	**ರ್ಳ**	**ರ್ೞ**
ಱ	ಱ್ಕ	ಱ್ಖ	ಱ್ಗ	ಱ್ಘ	ಱ್ಙ	ಱ್ಚ	ಱ್ಛ	ಱ್ಜ	ಱ್ಝ	ಱ್ಞ	ಱ್ಟ	ಱ್ಠ	ಱ್ಡ	ಱ್ಢ	ಱ್ಣ	ಱ್ತ	ಱ್ಥ	ಱ್ದ	ಱ್ಧ	ಱ್ನ	ಱ್ಪ	ಱ್ಫ	ಱ್ಬ	ಱ್ಭ	ಱ್ಮ	ಱ್ಯ	ಱ್ರ	ಱ್ಱ	ಱ್ಲ	ಱ್ವ	ಱ್ಶ	ಱ್ಷ	ಱ್ಸ	ಱ್ಹ	ಱ್ಳ	ಱ್ೞ
ಲ	ಲ್ಕ	ಲ್ಖ	ಲ್ಗ	ಲ್ಘ	ಲ್ಙ	ಲ್ಚ	ಲ್ಛ	ಲ್ಜ	ಲ್ಝ	ಲ್ಞ	ಲ್ಟ	ಲ್ಠ	ಲ್ಡ	ಲ್ಢ	ಲ್ಣ	ಲ್ತ	ಲ್ಥ	ಲ್ದ	ಲ್ಧ	ಲ್ನ	ಲ್ಪ	ಲ್ಫ	ಲ್ಬ	ಲ್ಭ	ಲ್ಮ	ಲ್ಯ	ಲ್ರ	ಲ್ಱ	ಲ್ಲ	ಲ್ವ	ಲ್ಶ	ಲ್ಷ	ಲ್ಸ	ಲ್ಹ	ಲ್ಳ	ಲ್ೞ
ವ	ವ್ಕ	ವ್ಖ	ವ್ಗ	ವ್ಘ	ವ್ಙ	ವ್ಚ	ವ್ಛ	ವ್ಜ	ವ್ಝ	ವ್ಞ	ವ್ಟ	ವ್ಠ	ವ್ಡ	ವ್ಢ	ವ್ಣ	ವ್ತ	ವ್ಥ	ವ್ದ	ವ್ಧ	ವ್ನ	ವ್ಪ	ವ್ಫ	ವ್ಬ	ವ್ಭ	ವ್ಮ	ವ್ಯ	ವ್ರ	ವ್ಱ	ವ್ಲ	ವ್ವ	ವ್ಶ	ವ್ಷ	ವ್ಸ	ವ್ಹ	ವ್ಳ	ವ್ೞ
ಶ	ಶ್ಕ	ಶ್ಖ	ಶ್ಗ	ಶ್ಘ	ಶ್ಙ	ಶ್ಚ	ಶ್ಛ	ಶ್ಜ	ಶ್ಝ	ಶ್ಞ	ಶ್ಟ	ಶ್ಠ	ಶ್ಡ	ಶ್ಢ	ಶ್ಣ	ಶ್ತ	ಶ್ಥ	ಶ್ದ	ಶ್ಧ	ಶ್ನ	ಶ್ಪ	ಶ್ಫ	ಶ್ಬ	ಶ್ಭ	ಶ್ಮ	ಶ್ಯ	ಶ್ರ	ಶ್ಱ	ಶ್ಲ	ಶ್ವ	ಶ್ಶ	ಶ್ಷ	ಶ್ಸ	ಶ್ಹ	ಶ್ಳ	ಶ್ೞ
ಷ	ಷ್ಕ	ಷ್ಖ	ಷ್ಗ	ಷ್ಘ	ಷ್ಙ	ಷ್ಚ	ಷ್ಛ	ಷ್ಜ	ಷ್ಝ	ಷ್ಞ	ಷ್ಟ	ಷ್ಠ	ಷ್ಡ	ಷ್ಢ	ಷ್ಣ	ಷ್ತ	ಷ್ಥ	ಷ್ದ	ಷ್ಧ	ಷ್ನ	ಷ್ಪ	ಷ್ಫ	ಷ್ಬ	ಷ್ಭ	ಷ್ಮ	ಷ್ಯ	ಷ್ರ	ಷ್ಱ	ಷ್ಲ	ಷ್ವ	ಷ್ಶ	ಷ್ಷ	ಷ್ಸ	ಷ್ಹ	ಷ್ಳ	ಷ್ೞ
ಸ	ಸ್ಕ	ಸ್ಖ	ಸ್ಗ	ಸ್ಘ	ಸ್ಙ	ಸ್ಚ	ಸ್ಛ	ಸ್ಜ	ಸ್ಝ	ಸ್ಞ	ಸ್ಟ	ಸ್ಠ	ಸ್ಡ	ಸ್ಢ	ಸ್ಣ	ಸ್ತ	ಸ್ಥ	ಸ್ದ	ಸ್ಧ	ಸ್ನ	ಸ್ಪ	ಸ್ಫ	ಸ್ಬ	ಸ್ಭ	ಸ್ಮ	ಸ್ಯ	ಸ್ರ	ಸ್ಱ	ಸ್ಲ	ಸ್ವ	ಸ್ಶ	ಸ್ಷ	ಸ್ಸ	ಸ್ಹ	ಸ್ಳ	ಸ್ೞ
ಹ	ಹ್ಕ	ಹ್ಖ	ಹ್ಗ	ಹ್ಘ	ಹ್ಙ	ಹ್ಚ	ಹ್ಛ	ಹ್ಜ	ಹ್ಝ	ಹ್ಞ	ಹ್ಟ	ಹ್ಠ	ಹ್ಡ	ಹ್ಢ	ಹ್ಣ	ಹ್ತ	ಹ್ಥ	ಹ್ದ	ಹ್ಧ	ಹ್ನ	ಹ್ಪ	ಹ್ಫ	ಹ್ಬ	ಹ್ಭ	ಹ್ಮ	ಹ್ಯ	ಹ್ರ	ಹ್ಱ	ಹ್ಲ	ಹ್ವ	ಹ್ಶ	ಹ್ಷ	ಹ್ಸ	ಹ್ಹ	ಹ್ಳ	ಹ್ೞ
ಳ	ಳ್ಕ	ಳ್ಖ	ಳ್ಗ	ಳ್ಘ	ಳ್ಙ	ಳ್ಚ	ಳ್ಛ	ಳ್ಜ	ಳ್ಝ	ಳ್ಞ	ಳ್ಟ	ಳ್ಠ	ಳ್ಡ	ಳ್ಢ	ಳ್ಣ	ಳ್ತ	ಳ್ಥ	ಳ್ದ	ಳ್ಧ	ಳ್ನ	ಳ್ಪ	ಳ್ಫ	ಳ್ಬ	ಳ್ಭ	ಳ್ಮ	ಳ್ಯ	ಳ್ರ	ಳ್ಱ	ಳ್ಲ	ಳ್ವ	ಳ್ಶ	ಳ್ಷ	ಳ್ಸ	ಳ್ಹ	ಳ್ಳ	ಳ್ೞ
ೞ	ೞ್ಕ	ೞ್ಖ	ೞ್ಗ	ೞ್ಘ	ೞ್ಙ	ೞ್ಚ	ೞ್ಛ	ೞ್ಜ	ೞ್ಝ	ೞ್ಞ	ೞ್ಟ	ೞ್ಠ	ೞ್ಡ	ೞ್ಢ	ೞ್ಣ	ೞ್ತ	ೞ್ಥ	ೞ್ದ	ೞ್ಧ	ೞ್ನ	ೞ್ಪ	ೞ್ಫ	ೞ್ಬ	ೞ್ಭ	ೞ್ಮ	ೞ್ಯ	ೞ್ರ	ೞ್ಱ	ೞ್ಲ	ೞ್ವ	ೞ್ಶ	ೞ್ಷ	ೞ್ಸ	ೞ್ಹ	ೞ್ಳ	ೞ್ೞ

=== Full list of consonant + vowel combinations ===
ಅ	ಆ	ಇ	ಈ	ಉ	ಊ	ಋ	ೠ	ಎ	ಏ	ಐ	ಒ	ಓ	ಔ	ಅಂ	ಅಃ	—
ಕ	ಕಾ	ಕಿ	ಕೀ	ಕು	ಕೂ	ಕೃ	ಕೄ	ಕೆ	ಕೇ	ಕೈ	ಕೊ	ಕೋ	ಕೌ	ಕಂ	ಕಃ	ಕ್
ಖ	ಖಾ	ಖಿ	ಖೀ	ಖು	ಖೂ	ಖೃ	ಖೄ	ಖೆ	ಖೇ	ಖೈ	ಖೊ	ಖೋ	ಖೌ	ಖಂ	ಖಃ	ಖ್
ಗ	ಗಾ	ಗಿ	ಗೀ	ಗು	ಗೂ	ಗೃ	ಗೄ	ಗೆ	ಗೇ	ಗೈ	ಗೊ	ಗೋ	ಗೌ	ಗಂ	ಗಃ	ಗ್
ಘ	ಘಾ	ಘಿ	ಘೀ	ಘು	ಘೂ	ಘೃ	ಘೄ	ಘೆ	ಘೇ	ಘೈ	ಘೊ	ಘೋ	ಘೌ	ಘಂ	ಘಃ	ಘ್
ಙ	**ಙಾ**	**ಙಿ**	**ಙೀ**	**ಙು**	**ಙೂ**	**ಙೃ**	ಙೄ	**ಙೆ**	**ಙೇ**	**ಙೈ**	**ಙೊ**	**ಙೋ**	**ಙೌ**	**ಙಂ**	**ಙಃ**	ಙ್
ಚ	ಚಾ	ಚಿ	ಚೀ	ಚು	ಚೂ	ಚೃ	ಚೄ	ಚೆ	ಚೇ	ಚೈ	ಚೊ	ಚೋ	ಚೌ	ಚಂ	ಚಃ	ಚ್
ಛ	ಛಾ	ಛಿ	ಛೀ	ಛು	ಛೂ	ಛೃ	ಛೄ	ಛೆ	ಛೇ	ಛೈ	ಛೊ	ಛೋ	ಛೌ	ಛಂ	ಛಃ	ಛ್
ಜ	ಜಾ	ಜಿ	ಜೀ	ಜು	ಜೂ	ಜೃ	ಜೄ	ಜೆ	ಜೇ	ಜೈ	ಜೊ	ಜೋ	ಜೌ	ಜಂ	ಜಃ	ಜ್
ಝ	ಝಾ	ಝಿ	ಝೀ	ಝು	ಝೂ	ಝೃ	ಝೄ	ಝೆ	ಝೇ	ಝೈ	ಝೊ	ಝೋ	ಝೌ	ಝಂ	ಝಃ	ಝ್
ಞ	**ಞಾ**	**ಞಿ**	**ಞೀ**	**ಞು**	**ಞೂ**	**ಞೃ**	ಞೄ	**ಞೆ**	**ಞೇ**	**ಞೈ**	**ಞೊ**	**ಞೋ**	**ಞೌ**	**ಞಂ**	**ಞಃ**	ಞ್
ಟ	ಟಾ	ಟಿ	ಟೀ	ಟು	ಟೂ	ಟೃ	ಟೄ	ಟೆ	ಟೇ	ಟೈ	ಟೊ	ಟೋ	ಟೌ	ಟಂ	ಟಃ	ಟ್
ಠ	ಠಾ	ಠಿ	ಠೀ	ಠು	ಠೂ	ಠೃ	ಠೄ	ಠೆ	ಠೇ	ಠೈ	ಠೊ	ಠೋ	ಠೌ	ಠಂ	ಠಃ	ಠ್
ಡ	ಡಾ	ಡಿ	ಡೀ	ಡು	ಡೂ	ಡೃ	ಡೄ	ಡೆ	ಡೇ	ಡೈ	ಡೊ	ಡೋ	ಡೌ	ಡಂ	ಡಃ	ಡ್
ಢ	ಢಾ	ಢಿ	ಢೀ	ಢು	ಢೂ	ಢೃ	ಢೄ	ಢೆ	ಢೇ	ಢೈ	ಢೊ	ಢೋ	ಢೌ	ಢಂ	ಢಃ	ಢ್
ಣ	ಣಾ	ಣಿ	ಣೀ	ಣು	ಣೂ	ಣೃ	ಣೄ	ಣೆ	ಣೇ	ಣೈ	ಣೊ	ಣೋ	ಣೌ	ಣಂ	ಣಃ	ಣ್
ತ	ತಾ	ತಿ	ತೀ	ತು	ತೂ	ತೃ	ತೄ	ತೆ	ತೇ	ತೈ	ತೊ	ತೋ	ತೌ	ತಂ	ತಃ	ತ್
ಥ	ಥಾ	ಥಿ	ಥೀ	ಥು	ಥೂ	ಥೃ	ಥೄ	ಥೆ	ಥೇ	ಥೈ	ಥೊ	ಥೋ	ಥೌ	ಥಂ	ಥಃ	ಥ್
ದ	ದಾ	ದಿ	ದೀ	ದು	ದೂ	ದೃ	ದೄ	ದೆ	ದೇ	ದೈ	ದೊ	ದೋ	ದೌ	ದಂ	ದಃ	ದ್
ಧ	ಧಾ	ಧಿ	ಧೀ	ಧು	ಧೂ	ಧೃ	ಧೄ	ಧೆ	ಧೇ	ಧೈ	ಧೊ	ಧೋ	ಧೌ	ಧಂ	ಧಃ	ಧ್
ನ	ನಾ	ನಿ	ನೀ	ನು	ನೂ	ನೃ	ನೄ	ನೆ	ನೇ	ನೈ	ನೊ	ನೋ	ನೌ	ನಂ	ನಃ	ನ್
ಪ	ಪಾ	ಪಿ	ಪೀ	ಪು	ಪೂ	ಪೃ	ಪೄ	ಪೆ	ಪೇ	ಪೈ	ಪೊ	ಪೋ	ಪೌ	ಪಂ	ಪಃ	ಪ್
ಫ	ಫಾ	ಫಿ	ಫೀ	ಫು	ಫೂ	ಫೃ	ಫೄ	ಫೆ	ಫೇ	ಫೈ	ಫೊ	ಫೋ	ಫೌ	ಫಂ	ಫಃ	ಫ್
ಬ	ಬಾ	ಬಿ	ಬೀ	ಬು	ಬೂ	ಬೃ	ಬೄ	ಬೆ	ಬೇ	ಬೈ	ಬೊ	ಬೋ	ಬೌ	ಬಂ	ಬಃ	ಬ್
ಭ	ಭಾ	ಭಿ	ಭೀ	ಭು	ಭೂ	ಭೃ	ಭೄ	ಭೆ	ಭೇ	ಭೈ	ಭೊ	ಭೋ	ಭೌ	ಭಂ	ಭಃ	ಭ್
ಮ	ಮಾ	ಮಿ	ಮೀ	ಮು	ಮೂ	ಮೃ	ಮೄ	ಮೆ	ಮೇ	ಮೈ	ಮೊ	ಮೋ	ಮೌ	ಮಂ	ಮಃ	ಮ್
ಯ	ಯಾ	ಯಿ	ಯೀ	ಯು	ಯೂ	ಯೃ	ಯೄ	ಯೆ	ಯೇ	ಯೈ	ಯೊ	ಯೋ	ಯೌ	ಯಂ	ಯಃ	ಯ್
ರ	ರಾ	ರಿ	ರೀ	ರು	ರೂ	ರೃ	ರೄ	ರೆ	ರೇ	ರೈ	ರೊ	ರೋ	ರೌ	ರಂ	ರಃ	ರ್
ಱ	ಱಾ	ಱಿ	ಱೀ	ಱು	ಱೂ	ಱೃ	ಱೄ	ಱೆ	ಱೇ	ಱೈ	ಱೊ	ಱೋ	ಱೌ	ಱಂ	ಱಃ	ಱ್
ಲ	ಲಾ	ಲಿ	ಲೀ	ಲು	ಲೂ	ಲೃ	ಲೄ	ಲೆ	ಲೇ	ಲೈ	ಲೊ	ಲೋ	ಲೌ	ಲಂ	ಲಃ	ಲ್
ವ	ವಾ	ವಿ	ವೀ	ವು	ವೂ	ವೃ	ವೄ	ವೆ	ವೇ	ವೈ	ವೊ	ವೋ	ವೌ	ವಂ	ವಃ	ವ್
ಶ	ಶಾ	ಶಿ	ಶೀ	ಶು	ಶೂ	ಶೃ	ಶೄ	ಶೆ	ಶೇ	ಶೈ	ಶೊ	ಶೋ	ಶೌ	ಶಂ	ಶಃ	ಶ್
ಷ	ಷಾ	ಷಿ	ಷೀ	ಷು	ಷೂ	ಷೃ	ಷೄ	ಷೆ	ಷೇ	ಷೈ	ಷೊ	ಷೋ	ಷೌ	ಷಂ	ಷಃ	ಷ್
ಸ	ಸಾ	ಸಿ	ಸೀ	ಸು	ಸೂ	ಸೃ	ಸೄ	ಸೆ	ಸೇ	ಸೈ	ಸೊ	ಸೋ	ಸೌ	ಸಂ	ಸಃ	ಸ್
ಹ	ಹಾ	ಹಿ	ಹೀ	ಹು	ಹೂ	ಹೃ	ಹೄ	ಹೆ	ಹೇ	ಹೈ	ಹೊ	ಹೋ	ಹೌ	ಹಂ	ಹಃ	ಹ್
ಳ	ಳಾ	ಳಿ	ಳೀ	ಳು	ಳೂ	ಳೃ	ಳೄ	ಳೆ	ಳೇ	ಳೈ	ಳೊ	ಳೋ	ಳೌ	ಳಂ	ಳಃ	ಳ್
ೞ	ೞಾ	ೞಿ	ೞೀ	ೞು	ೞೂ	ೞೃ	ೞೄ	ೞೆ	ೞೇ	ೞೈ	ೞೊ	ೞೋ	ೞೌ	ೞಂ	ೞಃ	ೞ್

The formations shown boldface above are seldom used.

== Numerals ==
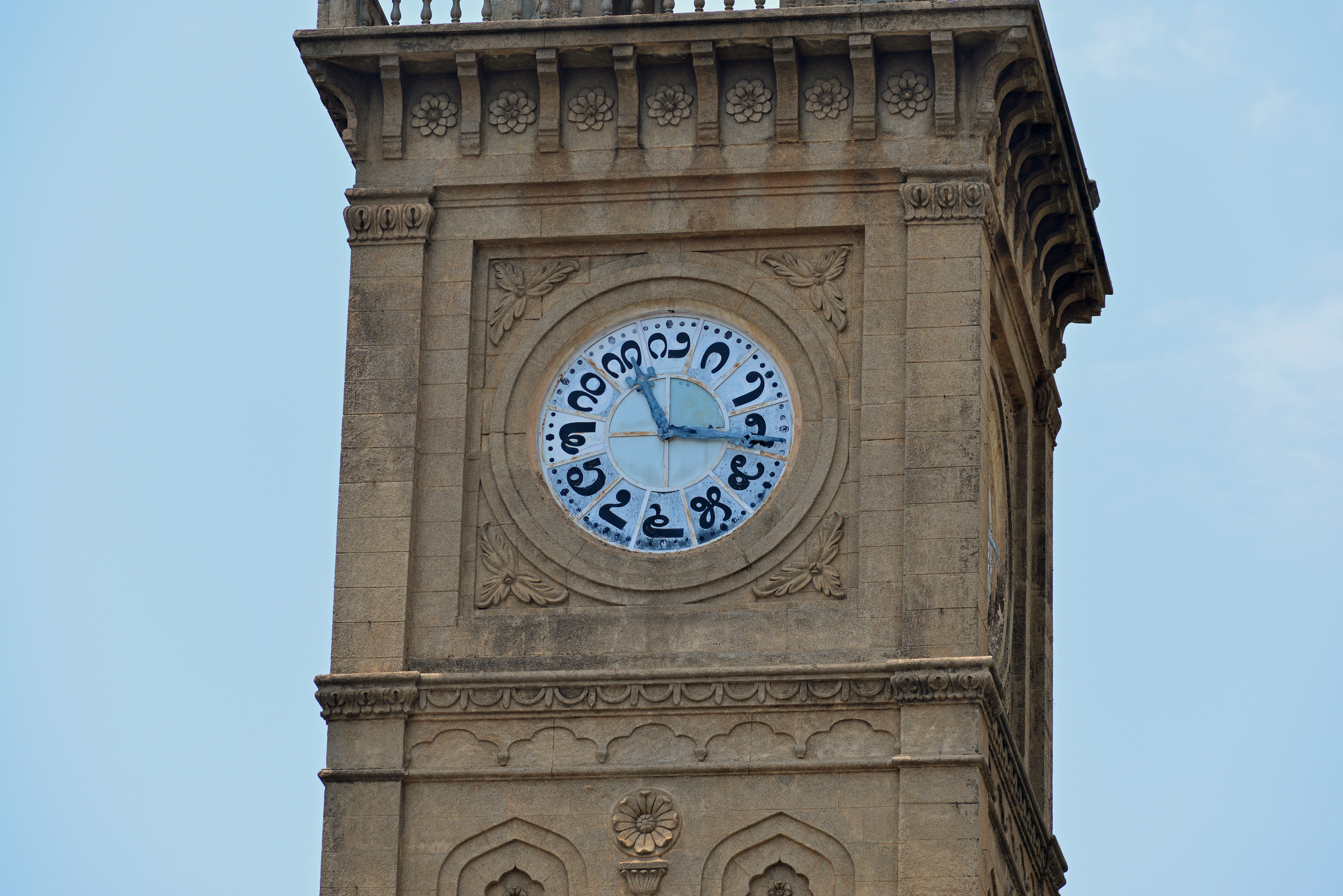
Clock in Mysore with Kannada numerals. Note that the rotation of digits is not uniform along the outer ring: numerals 3 (left), 6 (bottom), 9 (right) and 12 (top) are upright, numbers 1, 2, 4, 7 and 8 are slightly rotated to the right, numbers 5, 10 and 11 are slightly rotated to the left, so they are all readable as if they were all upright (with numbers 10, 11 and 12 read normally from left to right, ignoring the slight rotations).

The decimal numerals in the script are:

Kannada numerals
0 sonne ೦	1 ondu ೧	2 eraḍu ೨	3 mūru ೩	4 nālku ೪	5 aidu ೫	6 āru ೬	7 ēḷu ೭	8 enṭu ೮	9 oṃbattu ೯

== Transliteration ==
Several transliteration schemes/tools are used to type Kannada characters using a standard keyboard. These include Baraha (based on ITRANS), Pada Software and several internet tools like Google transliteration, Quillpad (predictive transliterator). Nudi, the Government of Karnataka's standard for Kannada Input, is a phonetic layout loosely based on transliteration.

== In popular culture ==
Due to its resemblance to an eye and an eyebrow, the Kannada letter ಠ ṭha is used in the "look of disapproval" (displayed as "ಠ_ಠ"), a popular emoticon used to convey disapproval or contempt. Similarly, the akshara ರೃ rr̥a has been used in emoticons to represent a monocle, while ಥ tha has been used to represent a tearing eye.

== Unicode ==
Kannada script was added to the Unicode Standard in October 1991 with the release of version 1.0.

The Unicode block for Kannada is U+0C80–U+0CFF:

Kannada^{[1]}^{[2]} Official Unicode Consortium code chart (PDF)
	0	1	2	3	4	5	6	7	8	9	A	B	C	D	E	F
U+0C8x	ಀ	ಁ	ಂ	ಃ	಄	ಅ	ಆ	ಇ	ಈ	ಉ	ಊ	ಋ	ಌ		ಎ	ಏ
U+0C9x	ಐ		ಒ	ಓ	ಔ	ಕ	ಖ	ಗ	ಘ	ಙ	ಚ	ಛ	ಜ	ಝ	ಞ	ಟ
U+0CAx	ಠ	ಡ	ಢ	ಣ	ತ	ಥ	ದ	ಧ	ನ		ಪ	ಫ	ಬ	ಭ	ಮ	ಯ
U+0CBx	ರ	ಱ	ಲ	ಳ		ವ	ಶ	ಷ	ಸ	ಹ			಼	ಽ	ಾ	ಿ
U+0CCx	ೀ	ು	ೂ	ೃ	ೄ		ೆ	ೇ	ೈ		ೊ	ೋ	ೌ	್		
U+0CDx						ೕ	ೖ						೜	ೝ	ೞ	
U+0CEx	ೠ	ೡ	ೢ	ೣ			೦	೧	೨	೩	೪	೫	೬	೭	೮	೯
U+0CFx		ೱ	ೲ	ೳ												
Notes 1.As of Unicode version 18.0 2.Grey areas indicate non-assigned code points

== See also ==
- Pyu script
- Goykanadi
- Bhattiprolu script
- Kannada Braille
- Kannada grammar
- Kannada literature
- Kannada poetry
- Lari
- Official script
- Telugu script
- Grantha script
- ISO 15919
