= Kadamba script =

Historic abugida of South India

- Script type: Abugida
- Period: 4–7th century CE
- Direction: Left-to-right
- Languages: Old Kannada; Old Telugu; Sanskrit; Konkani

Related scripts
- Parent systems: Egyptian hieroglyphs: Proto-Sinaitic; Phoenician; Aramaic; Brahmi; Kadamba script
- Child systems: Kannada-Telugu alphabet, Goykanadi, Pyu script

The Kadamba script is the first writing system designed specifically for writing Kannada, and later adopted to write Telugu language. Thus became important precursor to both Kannada and Telugu Scripts.The Kadamba script is also known as Pre-Old-Kannada script.

The Kadamba script is one of the oldest scripts of the southern group of writing systems that developed from the ancient Brahmi script. By the 5th century CE it became distinct from other Brahmi variants and was used in what are now the South Indian states of Karnataka, Telangana and Andhra Pradesh. It evolved into the Kannada-Telugu script by the 10th century CE and was used to write the Kannada and Telugu languages. It is also distantly related to the Sinhala script.

== History ==
Kadamba coinage

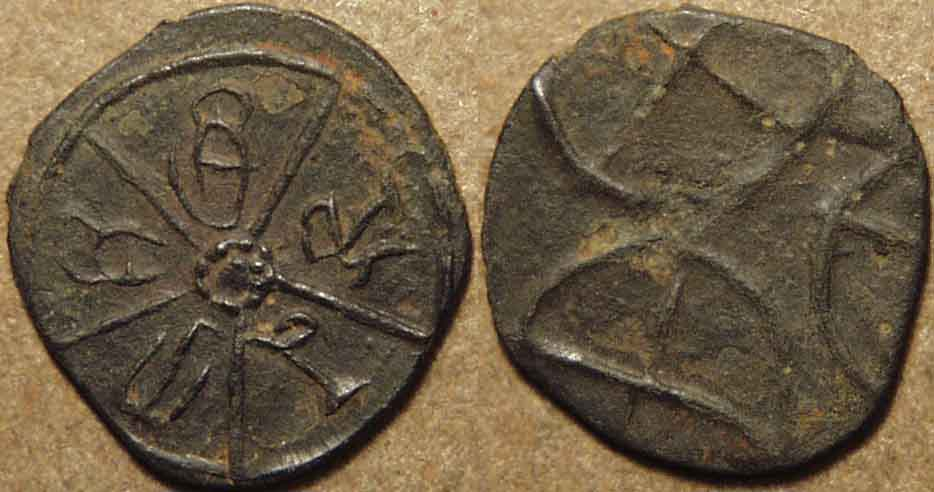
Coin of Kadamba king Sri Manarashi, name written in Kadamba script

Sri manarashi written in Kadamba script on Kadamba coin

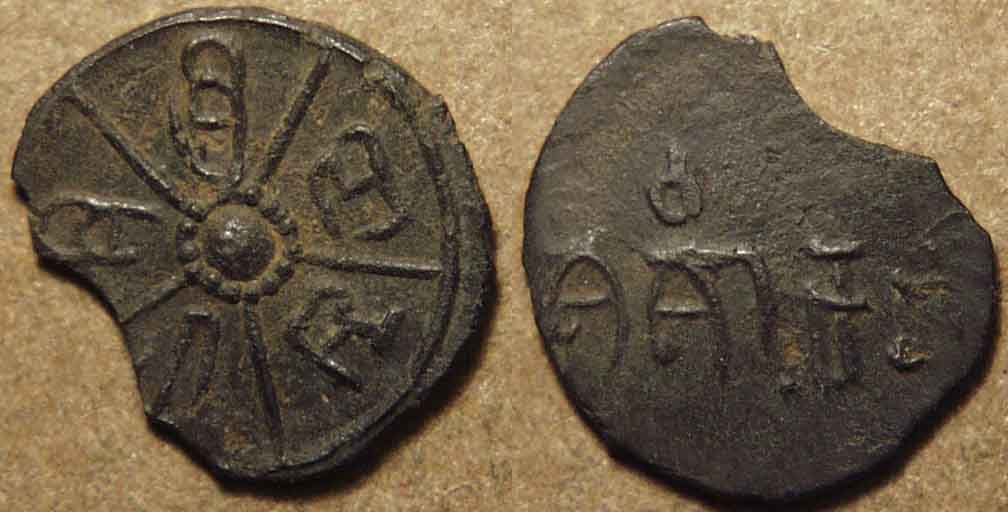
Coin of the Kadambas written in Kadamba script as sri dosharashi and other side Shri shashankaha

Sri dosharashi written in Kadamba script on Kadamba coin

During the rule of Kadamba dynasty (325-550), major change in the Brahmi script resulted in the Kadamba script, letters were shorter and round in shape. During (325 to 1000 AD) the rule of the Western Ganga dynasty in the southern parts of Karnataka the Kannada script used differently (also known as Ganga script) in rock edicts and copper plate inscriptions. During 6th to 10th century, the Telugu-Kannada alphabet stabilized during the rule of the Chalukyas of Badami from 500-1000 and Rastrakutas.

== Inscriptions in Kadamba script ==
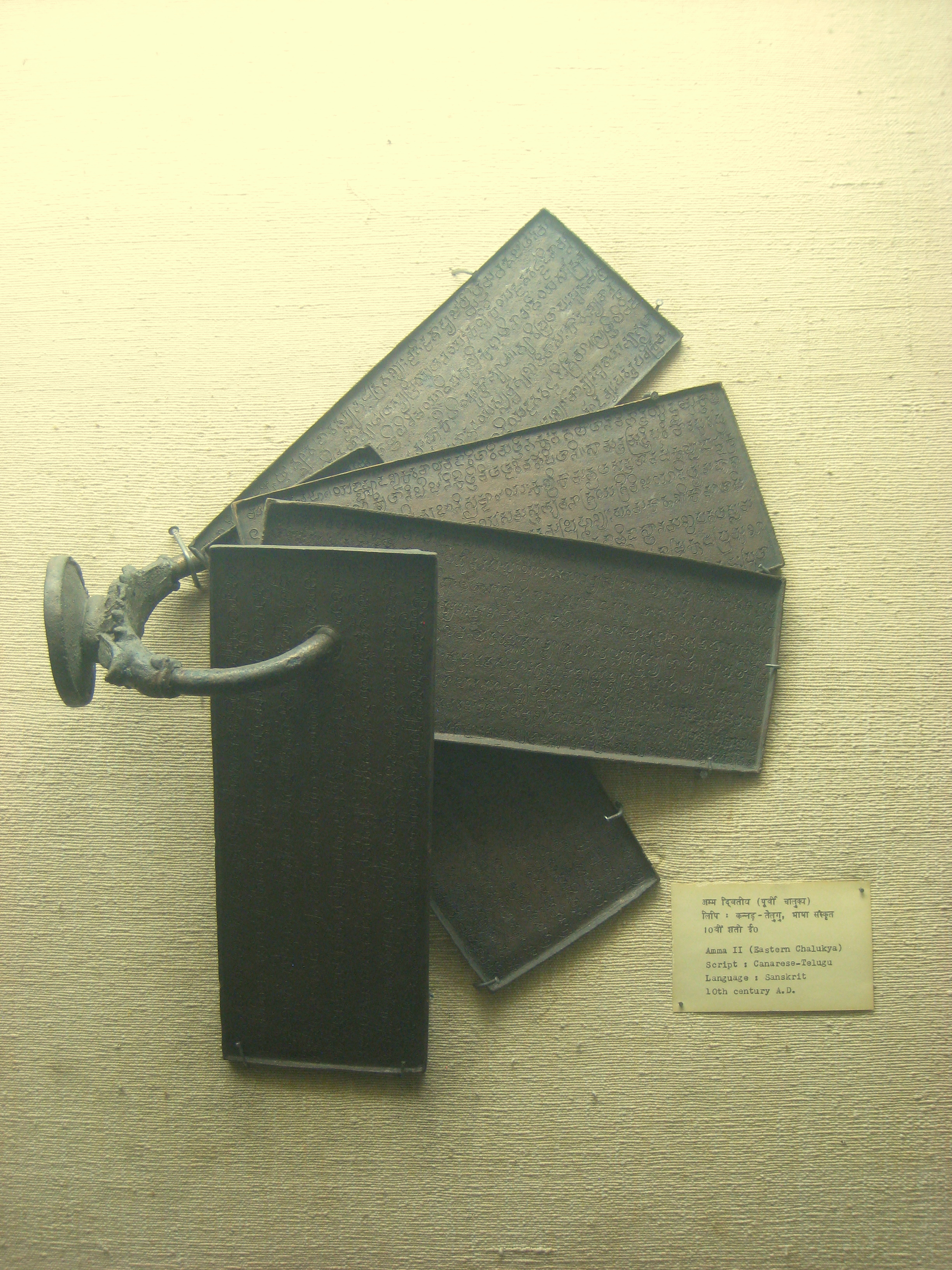
Sanskrit language written in Kannada-Telugu script of Eastern Chalukyas in 10th century AD

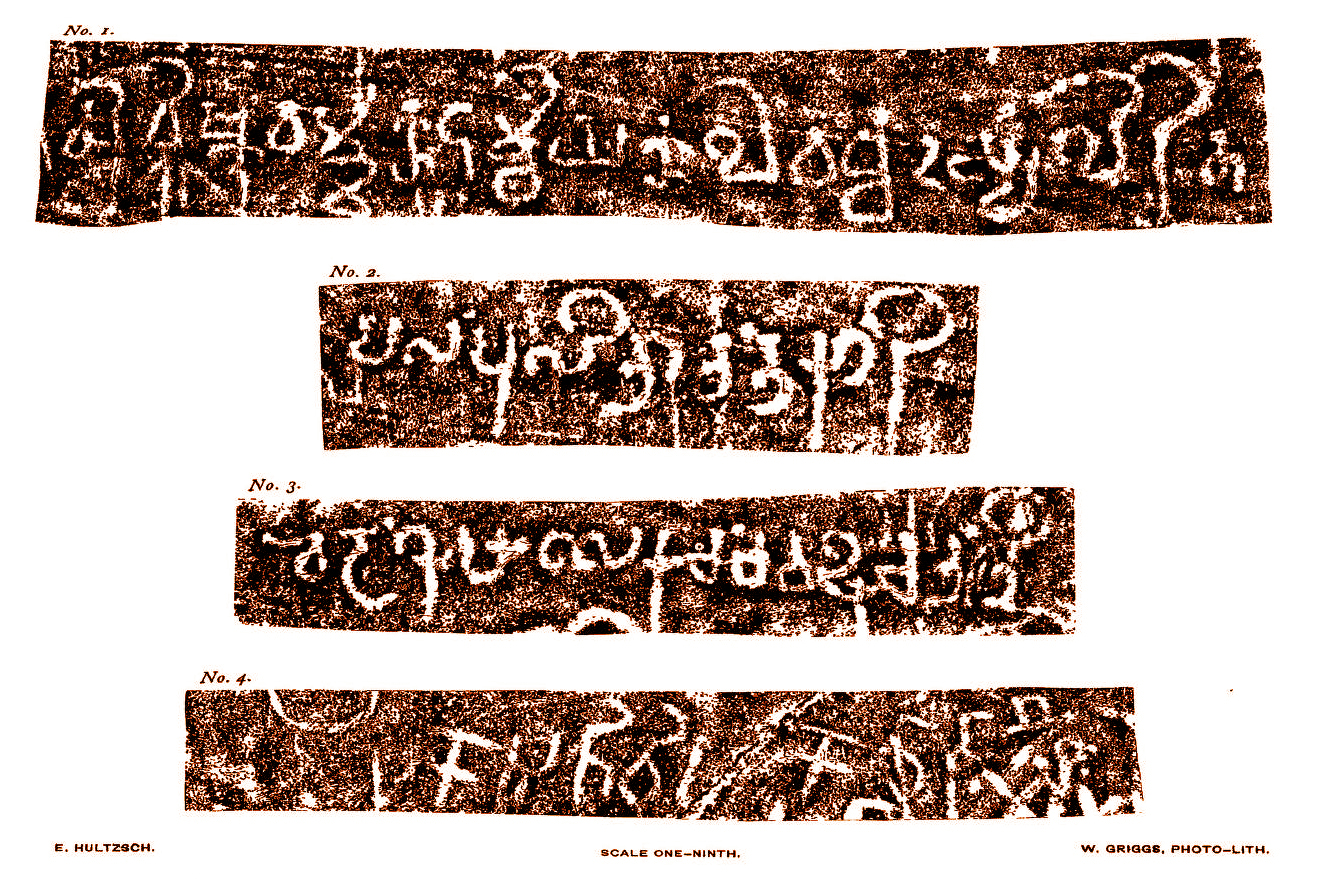
Prakrit Grantha inscription of Kadamba ruler Vishnuvarman (c. 5th-6th century CE) from Edakkal (northern Kerala)

- Gudnapur Inscription on 20-foot-long stone pillar written in Kadamba script
- Copper plate inscriptions in Kadamba (Pre - Chalukya) script, Kadamba-Pallava script, Kannada-Telugu script are available at Chennai museum
- Halmidi inscription
- Talagunda pillar inscription

== Similarity with other scripts ==
The Kadamba script shares similarities with scripts of certain languages belonging to the alphasyllabary or abugida family, including Goykanadi, Bhattiprolu script, Salankayana script, Pallava script, Gupta script, as well as its descendent, the Kannada script.

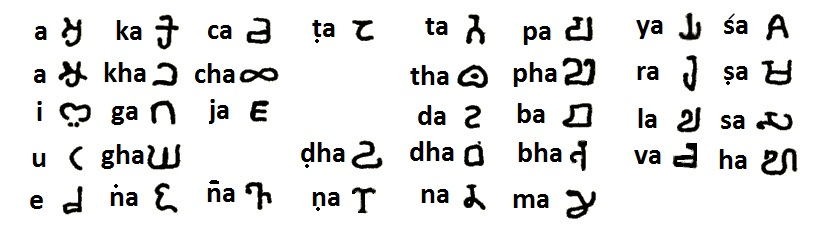
Latin symbols corresponding to Kadamba script.

== See also ==
- Ancient Philippine scripts
- Kalinga script
- Kannada script
- Palaeography-Kannada
- Telugu script
