= Goykanadi =

Script used to write konkani language

Goykānaḍī script Kandavī script
- Right side text is Goykanadi
- Script type: Abugida
- Period: 6th century – 17th century
- Languages: Konkani, Marathi

Related scripts
- Parent systems: Egyptian: Proto-Sinaitic; Phoenician; Aramaic; Brahmi script; Kadamba script; Telugu-Kannada alphabet; Kannada script; Goykānaḍī script

Goykānaḍī or Kandavī is a Brahmic script that was once used in the territory of Goa to write Konkani and sometimes Marathi in the Konkan coast. Similarly, it was used by the trading Saraswat and Daivajna families along with the Modi script to maintain their accounts.

== Overview ==
Goykanadi was used in Goa since the times of the Kadambas, although it lost its popularity after the 17th century. Goykanadi is very different from the Old Kannada script, with strikingly similar features. Unlike Old Kannada, Kandevi/Goykanadi letters were usually written with a distinctive horizontal bar, like the Nagari scripts. This script may have been evolved out of the Kadamba script, which was extensively used in Goa and Konkan.

== Usage and extinction ==
The inquisition of Goa is seen as a blot in the history of the Konkani language. According to the orders of the Goa inquisition, it was an offence to remain in possession of books in the local languages. All books, whatever their subject matter, written in Konkani, Marathi, and Sanskrit were seized by the inquisition and burnt on the suspicion that they might deal with idolatry. It is probable that valuable non-religious literature dealing with art, literature, sciences, etc., were destroyed indiscriminately as a consequence. For instance, even before the inquisition orders in a letter dated 24 November 1548, João Afonso de Albuquerque proudly reports his achievement in this direction.

Many Konkani manuscripts that are now found in museums in Portugal are Roman transliterations of Kandavi manuscripts of Hindu epics. The earliest document written in this script is found in a petition addressed by Ravala Śeṭī, a Gaunkar of Caraim in the islands of Goa, to the king of Portugal. This 15th-century document bears a signature in Konkani that says Ravala Śeṭī baraha ("writing of Ravala Sethi"). It is believed that most of the pre-Portuguese documents and books in Kandavi were burnt by the Portuguese missionaries.
