= Mario Nudi =

Italian police officer (1912–1945)

- Born: 17 July 1912; Rome, Kingdom of Italy
- Died: 28 April 1945 (aged 32); Dongo, Italy
- Military career
- Allegiance: Kingdom of Italy; Italian Social Republic
- Branch: Royal Italian Army; MVSN; Republican Police Corps
- Rank: Captain
- Conflicts: Second Italo-Ethiopian War; World War II

Mario Nudi (17 July 1912 – 28 April 1945) was an Italian soldier and police officer, the last commander of Benito Mussolini's personal bodyguard.

== Biography ==
He participated in the conquest of Ethiopia as an officer in the Royal Corps of Colonial Troops, in the same battalion as Indro Montanelli, who described him as "a good athlete, simple and courageous". Nudi later became capomanipolo (Lieutenant) of the Voluntary Militia for National Security and a member of the Moschettieri del Duce, Mussolini's honor guard, while also serving as president of the Fascist Confederation of Agricultural Workers. After the armistice of Cassibile he joined the Italian Social Republic, with the rank of captain of the VIII Black Brigade "Aldo Resega" of Milan. On 28 October 1944 he was transferred to the Republican Police Corps, being appointed questore and assuming command of Mussolini's escort, the so-called presidenziale, in place of Colonel Emilio Bigazzi Capanni.

In charge of the Duce's escort, during the twilight of the Italian Social Republic in late April 1945 he also became his driver, after the two men who had previously held this position, Angelo Assi and Giuseppe Cesarotti, disappeared in Como on 26 April 1945 in Como. While retreating towards Switzerland, he was captured by the 52nd Garibaldi Brigade "Luigi Clerici" along with Mussolini and other Fascist leaders, and shot in Dongo on 28 April 1945. His body was among those put on display in Piazzale Loreto in Milan.
