= Nudi (software) =

Software for using Kannada script

Nudi is a computer program used for typing in the Kannada script.

The Karnataka government funded the development of Nudi vide G.O. ITD 234 A da vi 2001, Bangalore, dated 27 December 2001. It was published by Kannada Ganaka Parishat, a non-profit organization. Up to version 5.0, it was developed based on the monolingual font-encoding standard prescribed by the Government of Karnataka. From Nudi 6.0 onwards, it has been based on Unicode. Nudi 6.1 was developed using AutoHotKey scripting.

Nudi supports most Windows-based desktop applications. In 2026, Nudi was expanded to mobile and web platforms with the release of applications for Android and iOS devices, along with a web-based version known as Nudi Web.
