= Telugu-Kannada alphabet =

Historic abugida

Telugu-Kannada script Kannada-Telugu script
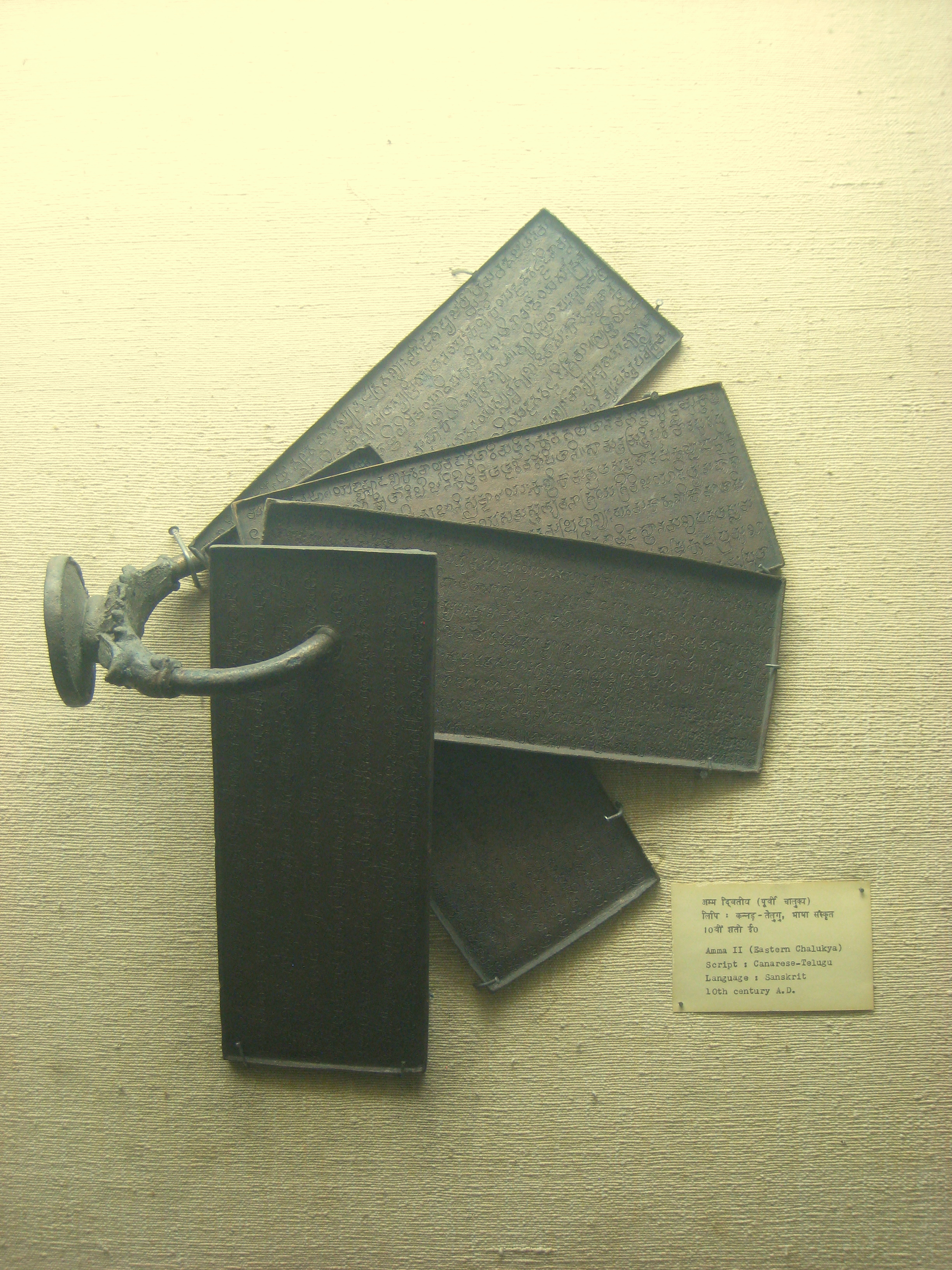
- Copper plate inscriptions in Kannada–Telugu script
- Script type: Abugida
- Period: 7th century –14th century
- Direction: Left-to-right
- Languages: Kannada; Telugu; Tulu; Konkani; Sanskrit

Related scripts
- Parent systems: Proto-Sinaitic script: Phoenician alphabet; Aramaic alphabet; Brahmi script; Kadamba script; Telugu-Kannada script
- Child systems: Kannada script, Telugu script
- Sister systems: Pyu

The Telugu–Kannada script (or Kannada–Telugu script) was a writing system used in Southern India. Despite some significant differences, the scripts used for the Telugu and Kannada languages remain quite similar and highly mutually intelligible. Satavahanas and Chalukyas influenced the similarities between Telugu and Kannada scripts.

== History ==
The Dravidian family comprises about 73 languages including Telugu, Tamil, Kannada, and Malayalam. Satavahanas introduced the Brahmi to present-day Telugu and Kannada-speaking regions. But according to Georg Bühler, it seems more likely that the Bhattiprolu script represents a provincial offshoot of early Brahmi in the south, rather than a separate line of development from a hypothetical Semitic prototype itself, as Bühler believed.

During the 5th to 7th centuries the early Bādāmi Chālukyās and early Banavasi Kadambās used an early form of the Kadamba script in inscriptions. When Chalukya empire extended towards Telugu speaking regions they established another branch in Vengi, namely the Eastern Chalukyas or the Chalukyas of Vengi who later introduced Kadamba script to Telugu language which developed into the Telugu-Kannada script which was used between the 7th and 11th centuries CE.

Between 1100 CE and 1400 CE, the Telugu and Kannada scripts separated from the Telugu-Kannada script. Both the Telugu and Kannada scripts were standardised at the beginning of the nineteenth century.

== Comparison ==
The following sections visualize the differences between modern-day Telugu (displayed on the left) and corresponding Kannada letters (displayed on the right).

=== Consonants ===
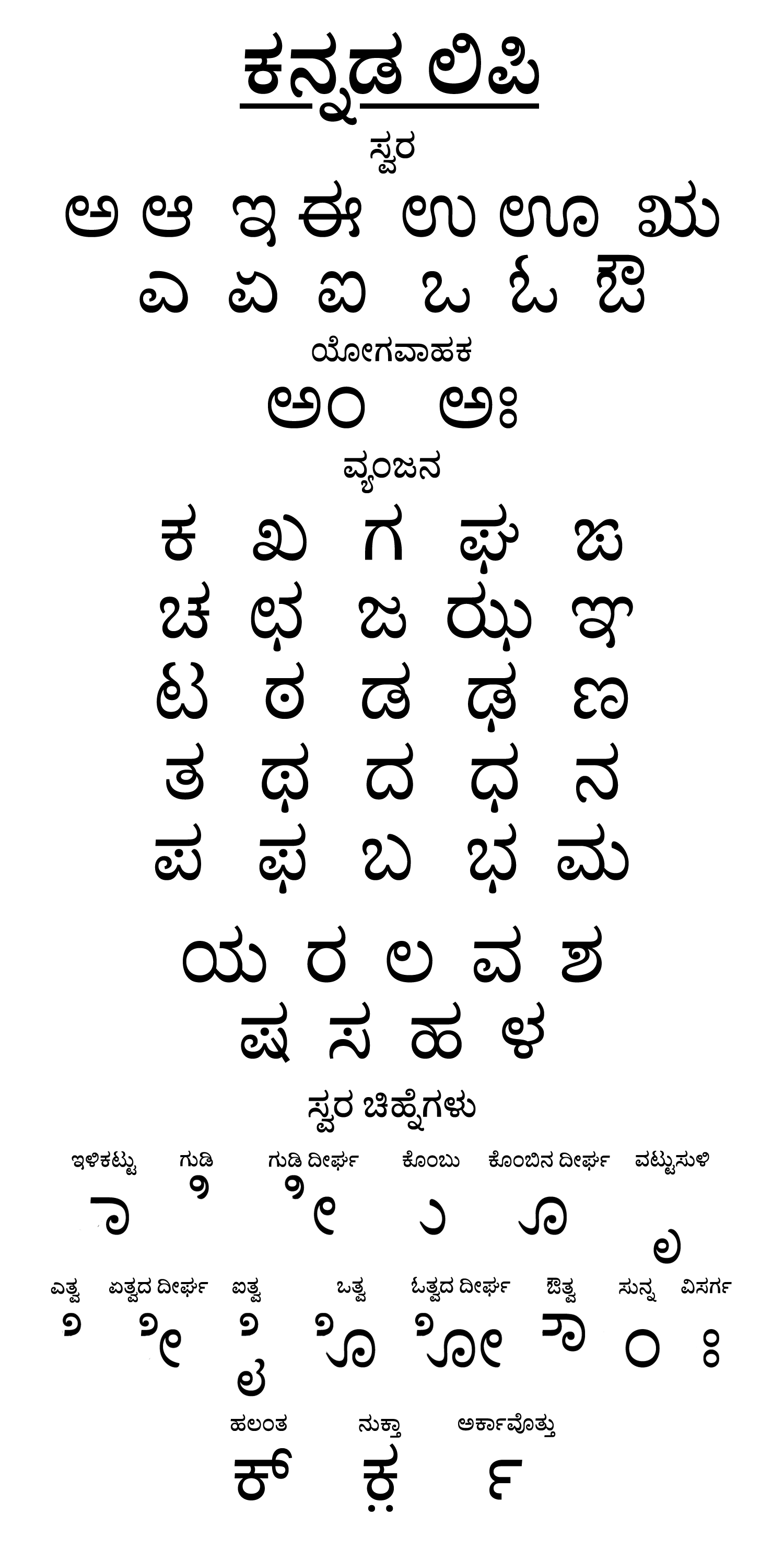
Kannada Aksharamala

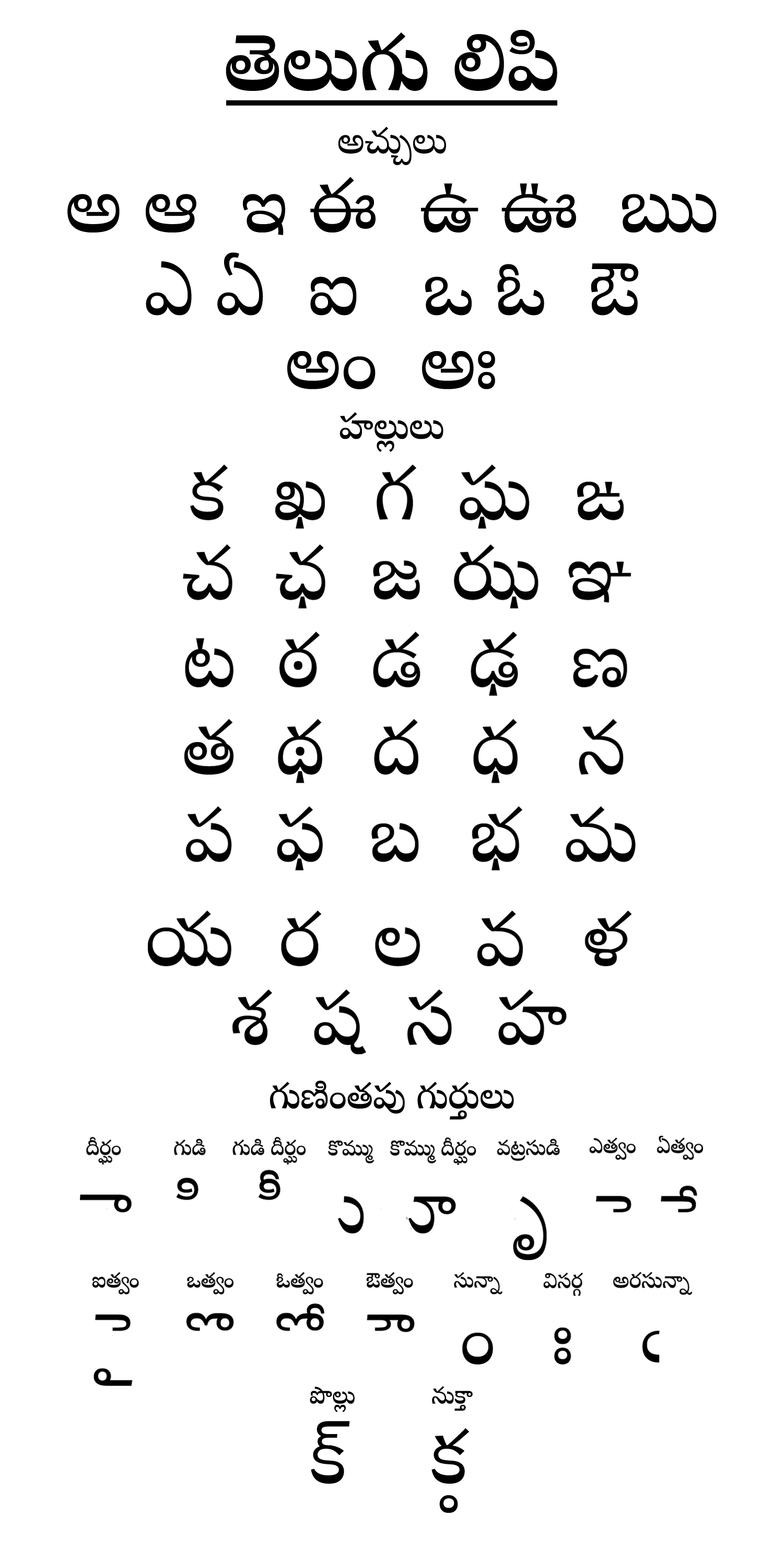
Telugu Aksharamala

కಕ ka IPA: /ka/	ఖಖ kha IPA: /kʰa/	గಗ ga IPA: /ɡa/	ఘಘ gha IPA: /ɡʱa/	ఙಙ ṅa IPA: /ŋa/
చಚ ca IPA: /tʃa/	ఛಛ cha IPA: /tʃʰa/	జಜ ja IPA: /dʒa/	ఝಝ jha IPA: /dʒʱa/	ఞಞ ña IPA: /ɲa/
టಟ ṭa IPA: /ʈa/	ఠಠ ṭha IPA: /ʈʰa/	డಡ ḍa IPA: /ɖa/	ఢಢ ḍha IPA: /ɖʱa/	ణಣ ṇa IPA: /ɳa/
తತ ta IPA: /t̪a/	థಥ tha IPA: /t̪ʰa/	దದ da IPA: /d̪a/	ధಧ dha IPA: /d̪ʱa/	నನ na IPA: /n̪a/
పಪ pa IPA: /pa/	ఫಫ pha IPA: /pʰa/	బಬ ba IPA: /ba/	భಭ bha IPA: /bʱa/	మಮ ma IPA: /ma/
యಯ ya IPA: /ja/	రರ ra IPA: /ɾa/	లಲ la IPA: /la/	వವ va IPA: /ʋa/	ళಳ ḷa IPA: /ɭa/
శಶ śa IPA: /ʃa/	షಷ ṣa IPA: /ʂa/	సಸ sa IPA: /sa/	హಹ ha IPA: /ha/	ఱಱ ṟa IPA: /ra/

There is another legacy consonant ೞ/ఴ (ḻa) used to represent /ɻa/, but currently not in use.

=== Vowels ===
==== Independent vowels ====
అಅ a IPA: /a/	ఆಆ ā IPA: /aː/	ఇಇ i IPA: /i/	ఈಈ ī IPA: /iː/
ఉಉ u IPA: /u/	ఊಊ ū IPA: /uː/	ఋಋ r̥ IPA: /ɾu/	ౠೠ r̥̄ IPA: /ɾuː/
ఌಌ l̥ IPA: /lu/	ౡೡ l̥̄ IPA: /luː/	ఎಎ e IPA: /e/	ఏಏ ē IPA: /eː/
ఒಒ o IPA: /o/	ఓಓ ō IPA: /oː/	ఐಐ ai IPA: /aj/	ఔಔ au IPA: /aw/

=== Numerals ===
౦೦ 0	౧೧ 1	౨೨ 2	౩೩ 3	౪೪ 4	౫೫ 5	౬೬ 6	౭೭ 7	౮೮ 8	౯೯ 9

== Unicode ==
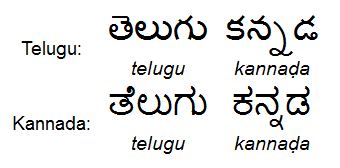
Telugu Kannada comparison

Although the alphabets for Telugu and Kannada languages could have been encoded under a single Unicode block with language-specific fonts to differentiate the styles, they were encoded separately by the governments due to socio-political reasons. Both the script variants were added to the Unicode Standard in October 1991 with the release of version 1.0.

== See also ==
- Culture of Andhra Pradesh § Literature
- Kannada inscriptions
- Palaeography § South India
- Linguistic history of the Indian subcontinent
- Pallava script
