= Baumeister =

Baumeister (German for builder) is a German surname. Notable people with the surname include:

- Alfred Baumeister (1934–2011), American psychologist
- Bernhard Baumeister (1827–1917), German actor
- Christian Baumeister (born 1971), German cinematographer
- Edward Baumeister (1848–1933), American politician
- Ernst Baumeister (born 1957), Austrian footballer
- Friedrich Christian Baumeister (1709–1785), German philosopher
- Herb Baumeister (1947–1996), U.S. serial killer
- Jackson Baumeister (born 2002), American baseball player
- Karin Baumeister-Rehm (born 1971), German artist
- Melitta Baumeister (born 1986), German fashion designer
- Muriel Baumeister (born 1972), German-Austrian actress
- Ralf Baumeister (born 1961), German biologist
- Reinhard Baumeister (1833–1917), German engineer and urban planner
- Roy Baumeister (born 1953), U.S. social psychologist
- Stefan Baumeister (born 1993), German snowboarder
- Truus Baumeister (1907–2000), Dutch swimmer
- Willi Baumeister (1889–1955), German painter and graphic artist
