= List of architecture magazines =

List of popular magazines that cover architecture and design

Architecture magazines and journals cover new architectural works, architects, and design. Architectural Forum, Architectural Record, and Architectural Review are among the oldest; each began publication in the 1890s.

== English or multilingual ==
=== Andorra ===
- L'Art de Viure, monthly magazine about architecture & design from Andorra, since 1996

=== Australia ===
- Architecture Australia, bi-monthly magazine published in Australia by the Australian Institute of Architects since 1915
- POL Oxygen, Australian and international architecture and design (2001 – 2008)

=== Austria ===
- architektur.aktuell, bilingual architecture magazine based in Vienna, since 1967

=== Canada ===
- Azure Magazine, architecture and design magazine based in Toronto

=== Croatia ===
- Oris, architecture and art

=== Finland ===
- Arkkitehti, a.k.a. Finnish Architectural Review, bilingual Finnish/English language magazine for architecture and planning, published since 1903, currently 6 times a year.

=== Germany ===
- DETAIL, German-based international architecture magazine
- Junk Jet, architecture
- Bauwelt, architecture
- Arch+, architecture

=== India ===
- Building Giants, Indian quarterly magazine, published by ABS Publication since 2010.

=== Iran ===
- 2A Magazine, architecture and art magazine based in Tehran

=== Israel ===
- Architecture of Israel, bilingual international - English/ Hebrew language magazine for architecture design and environment, published quarterly and online-only since 1988

=== Italy ===
- Abitare, international architecture and design magazine (bilingual: Italian and English), published monthly since 1961
- Casabella, Italian and international architecture magazine
- Domus, Italian and international architecture magazine
- Interni, Italian and international architecture, interiors, and design magazine

=== The Netherlands ===
- A10 - new European architecture
- Architectura, Published Weekly, founded by the Architectura et Amicitia Society (1893-1926)
- De Architect, Founded by the Architectura et Amicitia Society (1893-current)
- Bouwkundige Bijdragen, Published Annually by the Maatschappij tot Bevordering der Bouwkunst (1842-1881)
- Bouwkundig Weekblad, Published Weekly by the Maatschappij tot Bevordering der Bouwkunst (1881-1926)
- Bouwkundig Weekblad Architectura, Published Weekly (1927-1946)
- Frame, international design
- Volume Magazine, international architecture based in The Netherlands
- Wendingen, An Amsterdam School style Monthly Publication (1918-1931)

=== New Zealand ===
- Design Review, New Zealand (1948–54)

=== Republic of Ireland ===
- Plan, architecture, design, art and urban planning

=== Spain ===
- Arquitecturas Bis (1974–1985)
- El Croquis, Spanish-English bi-monthly magazine publishing monographs, est. 1982

=== Thailand ===
- art4d, English-Thai monthly magazine for architecture, art and design in Southeast Asia, based in Bangkok since 1995

=== United Kingdom ===
- Architects' Journal, British weekly magazine
- Architectural Design, UK-based architectural journal first launched in 1930 which today presents bi-monthly theme-based issues
- Architectural Digest
- Architectural Review, monthly, published in London since 1896
- Blueprint, British architecture and design monthly established in 1983
- Building Design, British weekly magazine, online-only since 2014
- Icon Magazine, monthly architecture and design based in London
- RIBA Journal, official journal of the Royal Institute of British Architects
- enki magazine

=== United States ===
- Architect, a U.S. architecture magazine with focus on design, practice and technology
- The Architect's Newspaper, founded in 2003 and published in New York, Los Angeles, and Chicago
- Architectural Forum (1892–1974), also known as The Brickbuilder and The Magazine of Building
- Architectural Record, an American magazine founded in 1891
- Architecture, monthly published in New York by Forbes & Co., Ltd., from 1900 to 1917 and C. Scribner's Sons from 1917 to 1936
- Architecture, monthly published in Washington, DC, by the American Institute of Architects from 1983 to 2006
- ArchitectureWeek, international, English-language magazine of design and building, published weekly and online-only since 2000
- The Classicist, annual journal of The Institute of Classical Architecture and Art which highlights New Classical Architecture, primarily buildings constructed in the United States
- Dwell, architecture and lifestyle
- Log, observations on architecture and the contemporary city published three times a year, based in New York City.
- New York Review of Architecture, cultural and political magazine rooted in architecture, based in New York City.
- The Next American City, architecture, design, and urban planning
- Metropolis Magazine, architecture and design
- Progressive Architecture, architecture, design, and technology (1945-1995); subsumed by Architecture magazine, published by the American Institute of Architects
- SOILED, periodical for architectural stories, based in Chicago, Illinois since 2011
- Surface Magazine, architecture, design, and fashion

== Other languages ==
- AG magazin, Serbian magazine for construction
- Baumeister, German monthly
- Byggekunst, defunct Norwegian magazine
- Deutsche Bauzeitung, German monthly
