= Anuthin Wongsunkakon =

Thai typographer

Anuthin Wongsunkakon (Thai: อนุทิน วงศ์สรรคกร; born 1973) is a Thai type designer and one of the founding partners of Cadson Demak, a Thai communication design firm. He began studying graphic design at Rangsit University during the time when the Thai design industry made its shift from pre-computer to computer based design. After completing his bachelor's degree he continued his studies in New York at Pratt Institute, choosing it for the city it's in rather than for its prestigiousness or distinction.

Anuthin and two of his close friends founded Cadson Demak in 2002, however, they eventually steered the company to communication and type design, which were their main services from then on.

Much of his work deals with print, logotype, and lettering, but he is best known for his contribution to Thai typography and for reintroducing custom font design service to the local business industry. Anuthin had provided fonts for many leading companies including Advance Info Service, Creative Technology, Men's Health (Thai Edition), Arena (Thai Edition), and Wallpaper* (Thai Edition), which he collaborated with Christian Schwartz to design Amplitude THAI. One of his more frequent collaborator is Ekaluck Peanpanawate, who worked closely on numerous projects such as dtac, Nokia Sans THAI, CAT, and Tesco Lotus (TL Family). Aside from his custom-made ones, his Thai and Latin typefaces has been used by various enterprises, most notably in local and international magazines such as Blue, Wired, and Snowboarding. Some of them appear on book covers, consumer products, and record sleeves e.g. Matchbox 20, Five for Fighting, etc. Additionally, his typefaces have been employed in identities for multinational companies such as Choice Hotel Group. His work has also been published and recognized by Type Directors Club New York.

Besides being a designer, Anuthin is known as a writer and design educator. He frequently write for several influential Thai magazines including Wallpaper* (Thai Edition) and art4d. In education, he first started his teaching career at Rangsit University, and later Bangkok University and Chulalongkorn University. Most of the articles from his controversy book on graphic design education in Thailand, Note The Norm, along with his various essays can be viewed at anuthin.org, a graphic design and typographic design archive weblog he found in 1999.

In 2010, his company organized BITS (Bangkok International Typographic Symposium), the first international typographic conference to be held in Southeast Asia. And the year after that, they officially established their partnership with Linotype.

== Typefaces ==
Latin typefaces designed by Anuthin Wongsunkakon include:

- Aspirin, 1999
- Metamorphosis, 1999
- Son Gothic, 1999
- Reform Set, 2001 (with Italic version by Christian Schwartz)
- Hydrous Set, 2002
- Aspirin Advance, 2005
- Do Gothic, 2006
- Penn Station, 2006
- Automate, 2008
- Carbon, 2008 (famously used in the Modern Warfare series of the video game Call of Duty)
- Bangkokean, 2009
- Carbon Plus, 2009
- Option Sans, 2009
- Amino, 2010
- Enzyme, 2010

Thai typefaces designed by Anuthin Wongsunkakon include:

- SMB Advance, 2000
- WongJonPidd, 2000
- Anuparp, 2004
- Amplitude THAI, 2005 (with Christian Schwartz)
- Ut Sa Ha Gumm, 2005
- dtac, 2007 (with Ekaluck Peanpanawate)
- TL Family, 2007 (with Ekaluck Peanpanawate)
- CAT, 2008
- Federbräu Sans, 2008
- Anuparp Thai, 2009 (for Linotype)
- Chang Sans, 2009
- DinDan, 2009
- Manop Mai, 2009
- Sukhumvit, 2009
- Ut Sa Ha Gumm Thai, 2009 (for Linotype)
- Blend, 2010 (with Supakit Chalermlarp)
- CPAC, 2010
- Kod, 2010
- Nakorn, 2010 (with Nirut Krusuansombat)
- Nokia THAI, 2010
- S&P, 2010 (with Supakit Chalermlarp)
