= Schwabach =

- Town
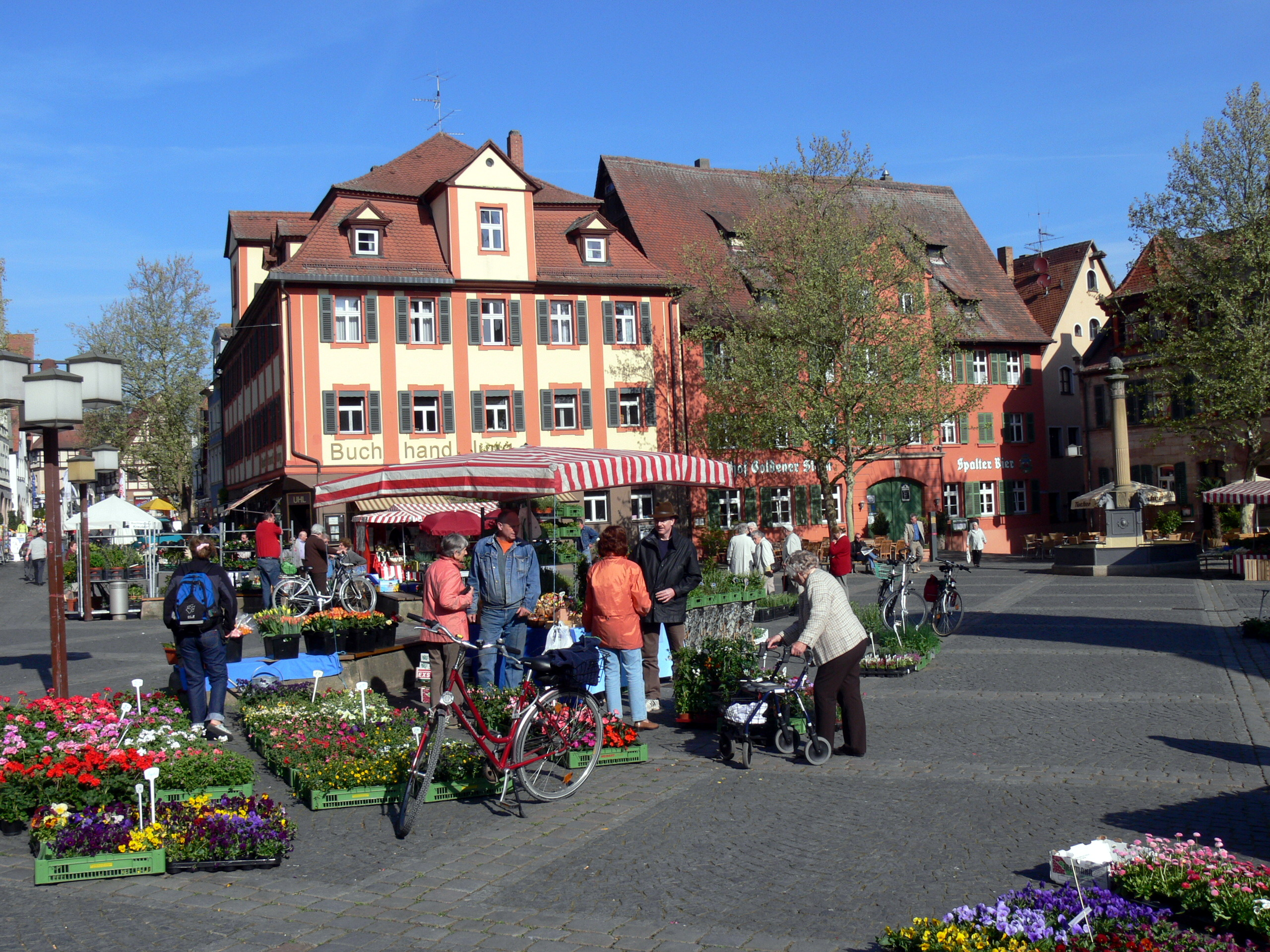
- Market square

- Flag Coat of arms
- Interactive map of Schwabach
- Location within Germany Location within Bavaria
- Coordinates: 49°19′45″N 11°1′15″E
- Country: Germany
- State: Bavaria
- Admin. region: Middle Franconia
- District: Urban district

Government
  - Mayor (2020–26): Peter Reiß (SPD)

Area
  - Total: 40.8 km^{2} (15.8 sq mi)
- Elevation: 326 m (1,070 ft)

Population (2025-12-31)
  - Total: 40,702
  - Density: 998/km^{2} (2,580/sq mi)
- Time zone: UTC+01:00 (CET)
  - Summer (DST): UTC+02:00 (CEST)
- Postal codes: 91101–91126
- Dialling codes: 09122, 0911
- Vehicle registration: SC
- Website: www.schwabach.de

Schwabach (German pronunciation: [ˈʃvaːbax]) is a German city of about 40,000 inhabitants near Nuremberg in the centre of the region of Franconia in the north of Bavaria. Together with the neighboring cities of Nuremberg, Fürth and Erlangen, Schwabach forms one of the three metropolitan areas in Bavaria. The city is an autonomous administrative district (kreisfreie Stadt). Schwabach is also the name of the river which runs through the city prior to joining the Rednitz.

Schwabach is famous for its crafts made of gold, particularly gold foil. In 2004, Schwabach celebrated this tradition with an anniversary festival, marking "500 years gold foil in Schwabach".

Around 1500, a local typesetter developed the "Schwabacher" font. This font was used for printing the first Bible in German, which had been worked out by Martin Luther.

== Etymology ==
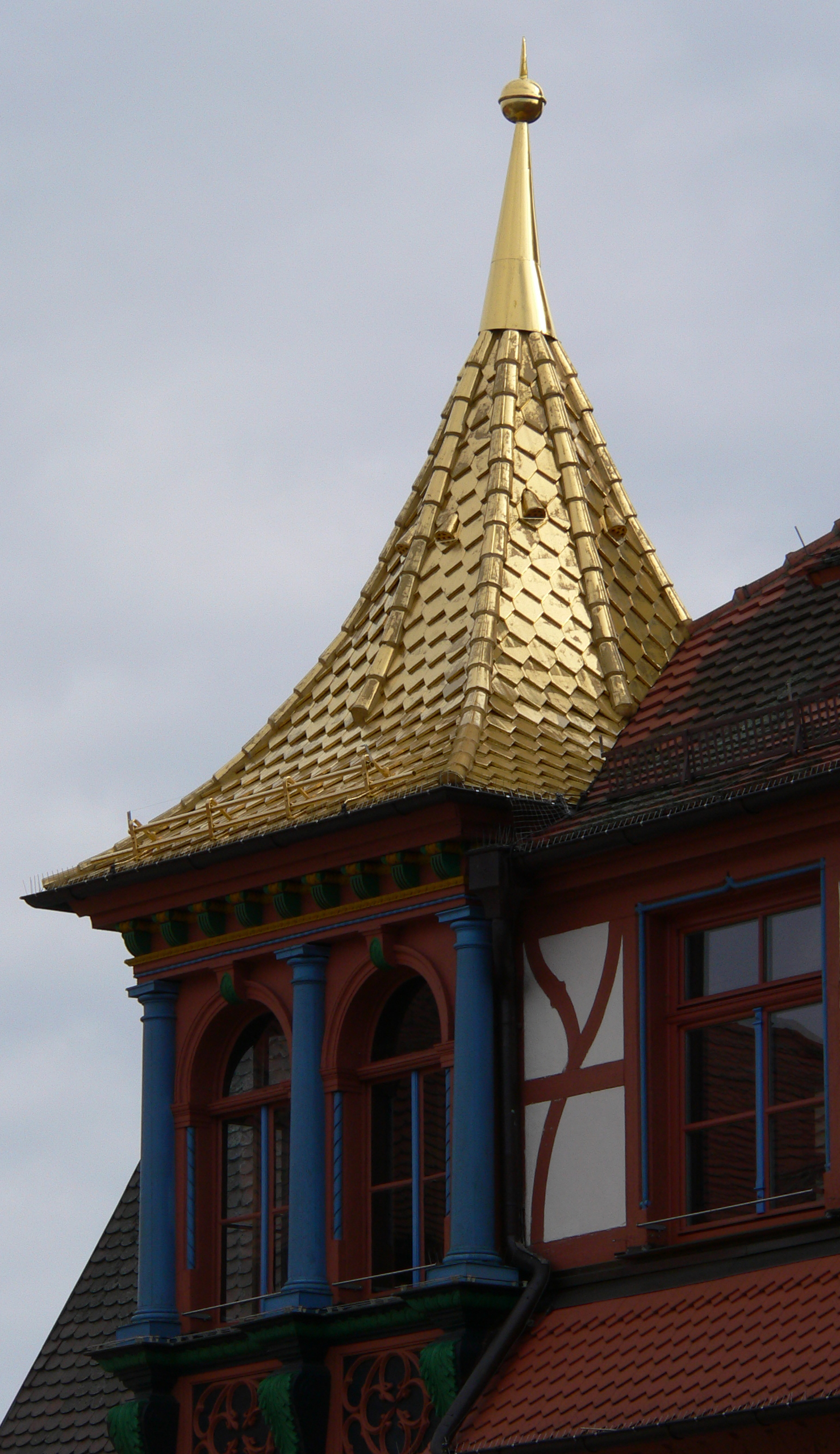
The gold roof of the city hall

The name derives from the old Franconian name Suapaha (later Suabaha, then Villa Suabach) which translates as "Schwaben-Bach" in modern German, which means "Swabian stream", the first part of the name was given by the Franconians who came to the area about a millennium after the Hallstatt culture to the people living on the banks of that stream, which were perceived as "Swabians" by them, while the second part of the name is a reference to the stream which flows through the city.

== Timeline ==
- 750 BC–AD 500: Archaeological evidence of settlement.
- 600–700: Name Schwabach first used to refer to the settlement and the river.
- 1346: City wall built.
- 1371: Municipal law established.
- 1469: Town church built (still in use).
- 1500: (ca.) Schwabacher font invented.
- 1528: City hall built (still in use).
- 1633: First needle factory established in Schwabach.
- 1723: Schwabach river flooded to highest point ever. Markings of the flood are still visible.
- 1768: The landmark Old Linden Tree planted (still there).
- 1792: Schwabach became part of Prussia.
- 1797: Goethe stayed overnight in Schwabach.
- 1806: Schwabach became part of Bavaria.
- 1849: Railway station built.
- 1941: Schwabach bombed in World War II
- 1945: American military base established in Schwabach.
- 1953: City coat-of-arms introduced.
- 1972: Schwabach became an autonomous administrative district.
- 1980: Schwabach receives the European Union prize for cultural heritage.
- 1992: US Army to be withdrawn from Schwabach and surrounding areas.
- 2004: 500-year anniversary celebration of the gold foil industry.

== Companies ==
- Apollo-Optik, optics company

== Twin towns – sister cities ==
Schwabach is twinned with:

- Les Sables-d'Olonne, France (1975)
- Kemer, Turkey (1998)
- Kalabaka, Greece (2002)
- Coronel Suárez, Argentina (2018)

== Notable people ==
- Jean-Philippe Baratier (1721 - 1740), german scholar, child prodigy
- Johann Gottfried Zinn (1727–1759), anatomist and botanist
- Adolf von Henselt (1814–1889), composer and pianist
- Hans Schuberth (1897–1976), politician (CSU), Federal Minister for affairs of telecommunication
- Matthias Volz (1910–2004), artistic gymnast, Olympic champion
- Manfred Ritschel (born 1946), football player
- Walter Zimmermann (born 1949), composer
- Ralf Baumeister (born 1961), professor of bioinformatics and molecular genetics
- Bernhard Grill (born 1961), electrical engineer, MP3 format developer
