= Jean-Philippe Baratier =

German scholar (1721–1740)

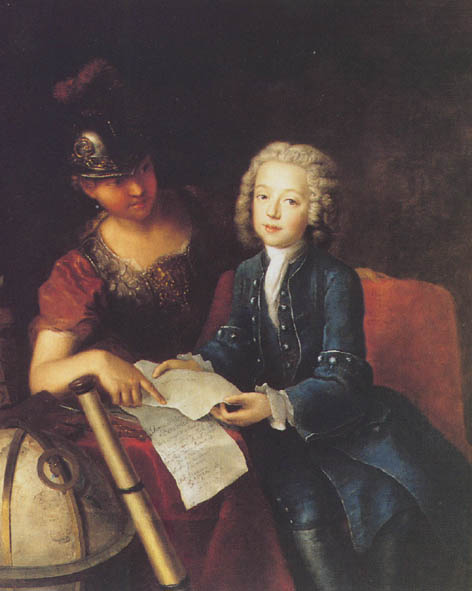
Johann Philipp Baratier, attended by Minerva, goddess of wisdom

Jean-Philippe Baratier (also Johann Philipp Baratier; 19 January 1721 – 5 October 1740) was a German scholar. A noted child prodigy of the 18th century, he published eleven works and authored a great quantity of unpublished manuscripts.

== Life ==
Jean-Philippe Baratier was born on 19 January 1721 in the town of Schwabach, near Nuremberg to Francois Baratier (1682–1751), a Huguenot minister at the local French church, and Anne Charles.

Under his father's careful conducting of his education, Baratier made progress in his early years. At the age of three, his father taught him, without the use of books or paper, the ability to read and write. His father then taught him Latin by gradually incorporating more Latin in his conversations with him, so that he was as familiar with Latin as he was with his native French and German by his fourth birthday. At the age of 4, his father began to teach him Greek, and by the end of 15 months (aged 5) he was reportedly able to translate the historical books of the Bible from Greek to Latin. He was at the age of 5 years and 8 months introduced to Hebrew, and by a year later he knew perfectly well entire parts of the Hebrew Bible. At the end of three years, he was said to be so well-versed in Hebrew that he was able to translate with ease even the difficult books of the Hebrew Bible (Job, Proverbs, Psalms, Isaiah), and knew all the Psalms by heart at the age of 7.

His progress was so rapid that by the time he was five years of age he could speak French, Latin and Dutch with ease, and read Greek fluently. He then studied Hebrew, and in three years was able to translate the Hebrew Bible into Latin or French. He collected materials for a dictionary of rare and difficult Hebrew words, with critical and philological observations; and when he was about eleven years old translated from the Hebrew Tudela’s Itinerarium.

At 14, he was admitted Master of Arts at Halle, and received into the Prussian Academy of Sciences, while working on a method to calculate longitude at sea. The last years of his short life he devoted to the study of history of the Jewish people and antiquities, did translations, and had collected materials for histories of the Thirty Years' War and of Antitrinitarianism, and for an inquiry concerning Egyptian antiquities. His health, which had always been weak, gave way completely under these labours, and he died at the age of nineteen.

In 1741, Johann Heinrich Samuel Formey wrote a biography of him, published at Utrecht. Samuel Johnson also wrote a biography of him, first published in 1740 in The Gentleman's Magazine.
