= Manoptica =

Thai typeface

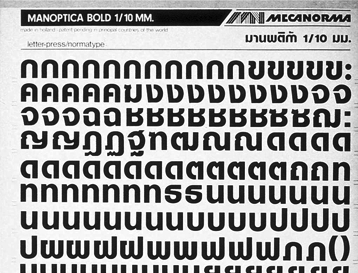
Partial original Manoptica dry transfer sheet

Manoptica is a Thai typeface based on Helvetica. Manoptica was developed between 1973 and 1987 by graphic designer and typographer Manop Srisomporn. Manoptica characters do not have the circular heads typical of other Thai fonts.

== Variants ==
Variants of Manoptica include:

- DB Manoptica
- DB Manoptica Italic
- DB Manoptica Condensed
- DB Manoptica Medium
- DB Manoptica Bold
- DB Manoptica Extended

== Use and reception ==
Manoptica is among the most widely used fonts in Thailand. It is commonly used in headings in advertisement and commercial art, and on street signage. In the Manoptica family, Manop 2 and Manop 5 are the most well-known. Manop 2 is mostly used in government services and individual companies. Manop 5 is mostly used in signage, with its unique opaque circular head and mixed light and bold proportions.
