= Creativeans =

Design company in Singapore

Creativeans is a branding and design consultancy based in Singapore, Milan, and Jakarta. The company is co-founded by Kimming Yap and Yulia Saksen, and works across disciplines from branding, UI/UX Design, packaging design, communication design, business design, product design, experience design, sustainable design to corporate training.

Creativeans' work has been on display in museums including Triennale Design Museum and Musée d’Art Moderne de la Ville de Paris, and featured in business and design publications such as Elle Decor, The Business Times, Cubes, Dwell and art4d.

From 2011 to 2012, they curated Treasures of the Little Red Dot - an exhibition held in Milan Furniture Fair that showcases design objects inspired by Singapore's culture. Creativeans also received a special mention at the Salone Satellite Award 2012 for Pod. Pod is a fabric-reinforced polypropylene food container, recognised for its creative use of materials.

In April 2013, Creativeans is one of the seven design companies selected by Singapore Furniture Industries Council to represent Singapore at Milan, Tortona Design Week where they presented new designs for brands Artifeq and NUUZO. In April 2017, Creativeans once again represented Singapore at Shenzhen Design Week - Global "City of Design".

In 2017, Creativeans released the book titled 'Are You Brand Dead?'

In 2022, Creativeans launched Singapore's first antimicrobial Chinese red packet design for Filos Community Services to support the needy in the community.

In September 2022, Creativeans marked their 10th anniversary by hosting 'Ten Designs in a New Decade' exhibition, which was held as part of Singapore Design Week 2022. The event was also attended by Senior Minister of State for Foreign Affairs, Ms. Sim Ann.

In 2023, Creativeans initiated the Care For Each Otter campaign in collaboration with the Jane Goodall Institute Singapore (JGIS). The objective was to enhance public awareness and knowledge concerning wildlife conservation in Singapore. This campaign was implemented as a component of their Chinese New Year fundraising initiative.

In May 2023, Creativeans announced the launch of The Project Matters. The launch was featured on various Indonesian media outlets including Medcom, Marketeers, Suara, JPNN, and Merdeka.

In 2024, Creativeans collaborated with the Jane Goodall Institute (Singapore) on “Coexistence by Design,” an official Singapore Design Week programme comprising guided nature walks, a panel discussion and a kokedama workshop. Later that year, Creativeans served as a creative partner for Dr Jane Goodall’s “Tour of Hope 2024” events in Singapore (7–10 December), held to mark Goodall’s 90th year.

In 2025, Creativeans co-founder Kimming Yap was named to Campaign Asia-Pacific’s “40 Under 40” list, which recognises emerging marketing and communications leaders across 14 Asia-Pacific markets.

In September 2025, Creativeans launched and curated Design WAH! Showcase, a Singapore Design Week official programme co-organised with Franchising and Licensing Asia (FLAsia) and supported by the DesignSingapore Council. The initiative spotlights Singapore’s emerging design intellectual properties (IPs) created by young designers and students, bridging creativity and commerce. Featuring character-based IPs, product concepts, and world-building narratives, the showcase aims to nurture a new generation of Singaporean designers by empowering them to take ownership of their creative works and explore their commercial potential. It reflects Creativeans’ ongoing commitment to developing Singapore’s creative economy through design innovation and IP commercialisation, aligning with the nation’s “Design 2050 Masterplan” vision of becoming a “nation by design.”

In October 2025, Creativeans announced BrandsBuilder.ai, described as Singapore’s first AI-powered brand consultant, launched at Tech in Asia 2025 in Jakarta, as it was selected to showcase at the Tech in Asia Conference Indonesia 2025 Startup Factory. This AI-powered brand consultant is built on the firm’s BrandBuilder® methodology to streamline brand audits, positioning and identity work. The platform has been noted in trade coverage as automating brand strategy tasks typically handled by consultants, and as part of Creativeans’ push to apply AI to brand governance and consistency at scale.

== Awards ==
The awards won by Creativeans include:

- Indigo Design Award 2025:

Project: Red Lips Category: Branding for Food - Other Award: Gold

Project:Lawe Category: Branding for Social Change Award: Gold

Project: Lawe Category: Websites Design for Social Change Award: Silver

Project: Minimax Category: Branding for Graphic Design Award: Silver

Project: Minimax Category: Branding for Interior: Silver

- Project: Ho Nuts - Singapore Packaging Star Award 2024
- Indigo Design Award 2024:

Project: Aeris Dynamics Category: Branding for Services - Other Award: Gold

Project: Aeris Dynamics Category: UX, Interface & Navigation for Digital Design Award: Silver

Project: Mascot Enterprise Category: Character Design for Graphic Design Award: Gold

Project: Mascot Enterprise Category: UX, Interface & Navigation for Digital Design Award: Silver

Project: Mascot Enterprise Category: Branding for Services - Other Award: Bronze

Project: Farmer Brand Category: Branding for Food - Other Award: Gold

Project: Farmer Brand Category: Packaging Design for Graphic Design Award: Silver

- Indigo Design Award 2023:

Project: Malt & Wine Asia Category: Branding for Alcoholic Beverages - Wine Award: Gold

Project: Malt & Wine Asia Category: Branding for Alcoholic Beverages - Other Award: Gold

Project: Panda Century Education Category: Branding for Kids Award: Gold

Project: Panda Century Education Category: Branding for Technology Award: Silver

Project: Vorel Category: Branding for Technology Award: Gold

Project: Chupitos Category: Branding for Restaurants/Cafe Award: Silver

- Indigo Design Award 2022:

Project: InstaProtection Category: Technology Award: Gold

Project: Blue Aqua Category: Food Award: Gold

Project: Evolta Go Category: Technology Award: Silver

Project: FYNXT Category: Technology Award: Bronze
