= Christopher John Rogers =

American fashion designer

- Born: Baton Rouge, LA
- Education: Savannah College of Art and Design
- Occupation: Fashion designer
- Website: christopherjohnrogers.com

Christopher John Rogers is an American fashion designer, born and raised in Baton Rouge, Louisiana, and currently based in Brooklyn, New York. Rogers debuted his first collection in fall 2018 at age 24, and in 2019 received the top prize at the 16th CFDA/Vogue Fashion Fund.

== Early life and education ==
Rogers was born and raised in Baton Rouge, Louisiana. His family has artistic roots: his mother, Johnell, was a former ballet dancer who became a medical technologist, and his father, Christopher, studied photography before making a career in library technology at Southern University.

As a high schooler at Baton Rouge Magnet High School, he began designing a line for New Orleans Fashion Week. He has described his early inspirations as including anime, the works of Paul Gauguin, and the monochromatic outfits worn by his grandmother and other members of the Baptist church his family attended.

For college, Rogers applied to Parsons School of Design, but after his acceptance letter was lost in the mail, he was accepted to and attended the Savannah College of Art and Design (SCAD). Rogers graduated from SCAD in 2016.

== Career and brand ==
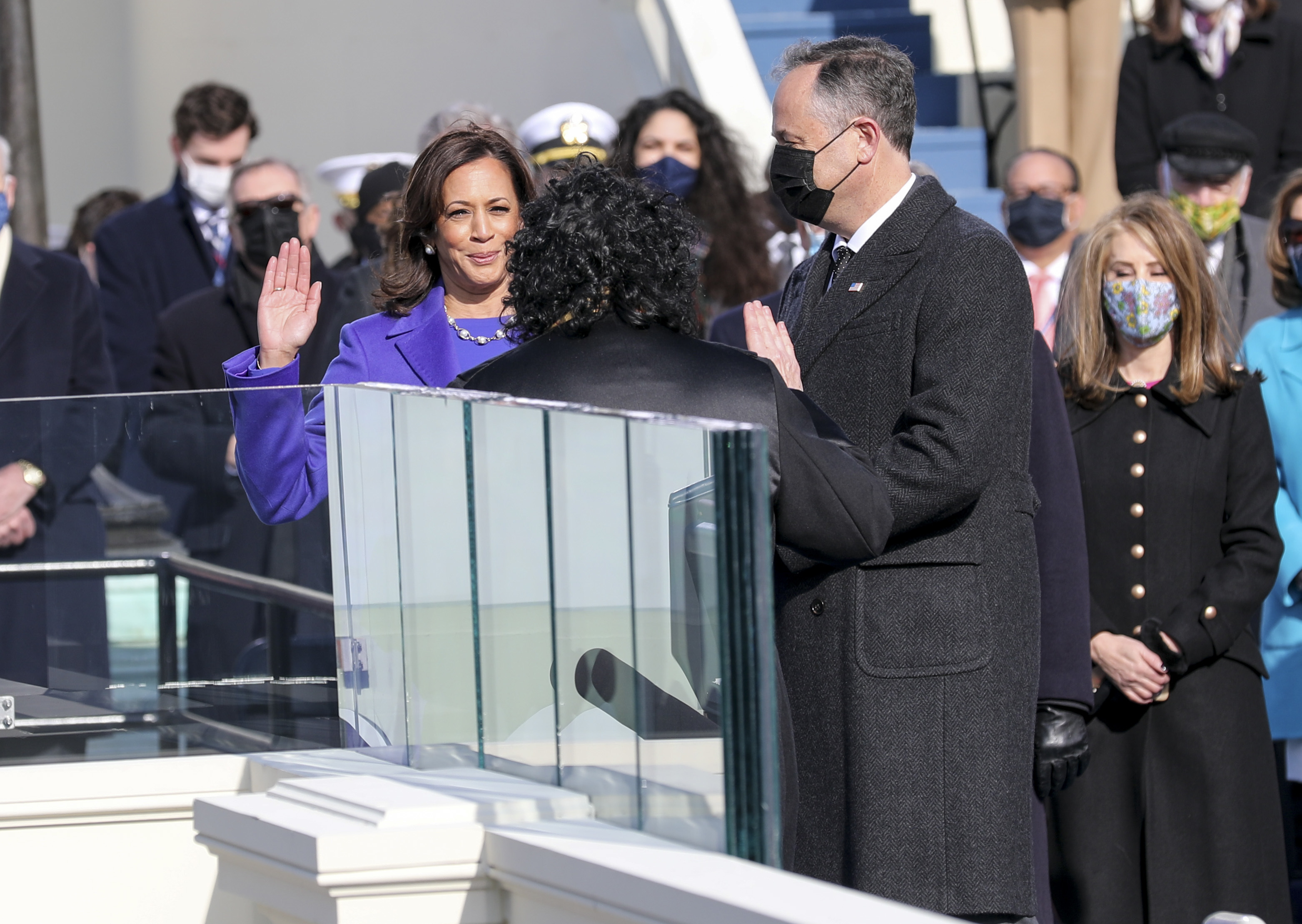
Kamala Harris wearing a jacket designed by Christopher John Rogers at the inauguration ceremony

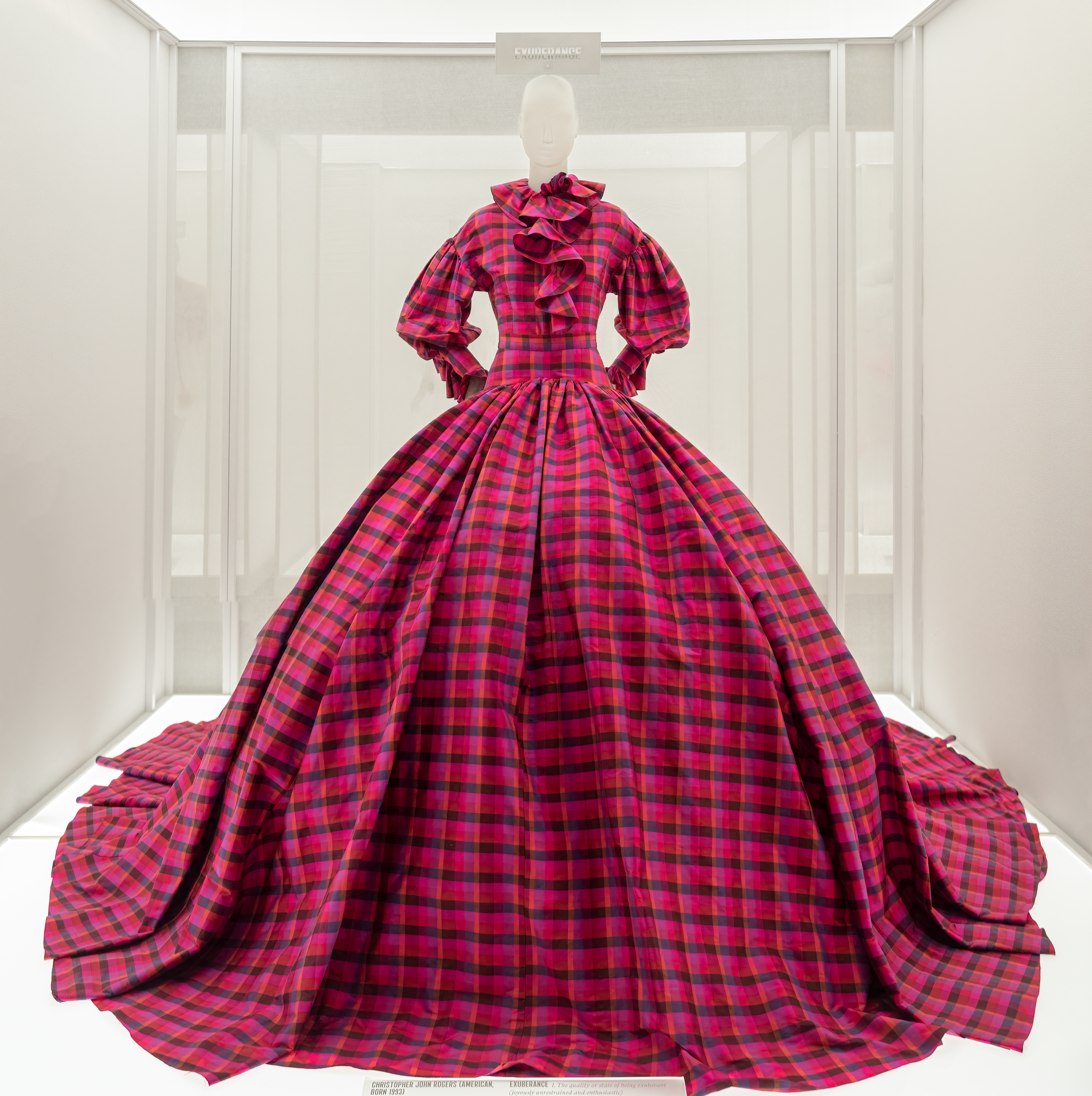
Ensemble by Christopher John Rogers from 2020-21 at the Metropolitan Museum of Art Part of the exhibit In America: A Lexicon of Fashion

After college, Rogers moved to Brooklyn to begin his career in fashion. He started by waiting tables, but soon landed a job at Diane von Fürstenberg, where he worked as an assistant to knitwear designer Henry Zankov. One of his first clients for his own designs was Cardi B, who wore a jacket from Rogers' graduation collection at the 2017 BET awards.

Rogers created his eponymous brand in 2016, and released his debut collection in fall 2018 at age 24, taking inspiration from his Southern Baptist upbringing, midcentury-modern couture and a deserted Californian beach. The collection premiered in Chinatown’s Martos Gallery. In 2019, he debuted his second collection at New York Fashion Week, and described it as "a debutante ball thrown at Stonehenge and illustrated by Dr. Seuss."

In 2019, Rogers received top prize of $400,000 at the 16th CFDA/Vogue Fashion Fund, and in 2020, he was awarded the first American Emerging Designer of the Year award by the Council of Fashion Designers of America (CFDA). The CFDA described Rogers's bold fashions as "emphasiz[ing] quality manufacturing and timeless appeal while encouraging its customers to take up space." That same year, he was named one of Forbes 30 Under 30 for 2020.

In 2021, Rogers' designs were featured in a fictionalized fashion in season one of the Gossip Girl reboot, in which character Julien Calloway (played by Jordan Alexander) walks in the show. The same year, Vice President Kamala Harris wore a design by Rogers in her inauguration ensemble. His brand also released a 70-piece collection with ALEXIS and RIO for Target in 2021.

Rogers returned from a two-year hiatus in 2022, with Collection 10 debuting in Brooklyn. The collection was titled "Playdough," and featured footwear designed by Christian Louboutin exclusively for Rogers. The same year, the Metropolitan Museum of Art displayed his work in its annual fashion exhibit, which that year was titled "In America: A Lexicon of Fashion."

One of his signature design elements is the "strawberry skirt," featuring a voluminous and structured exaggerated hip and a nipped waistline and hemline.

In 2024, J. Crew launched a collaboration collection with Christopher John Rogers featuring 48 pieces across all womenswear categories.
