= Architecture (magazine, 1900–1936) =

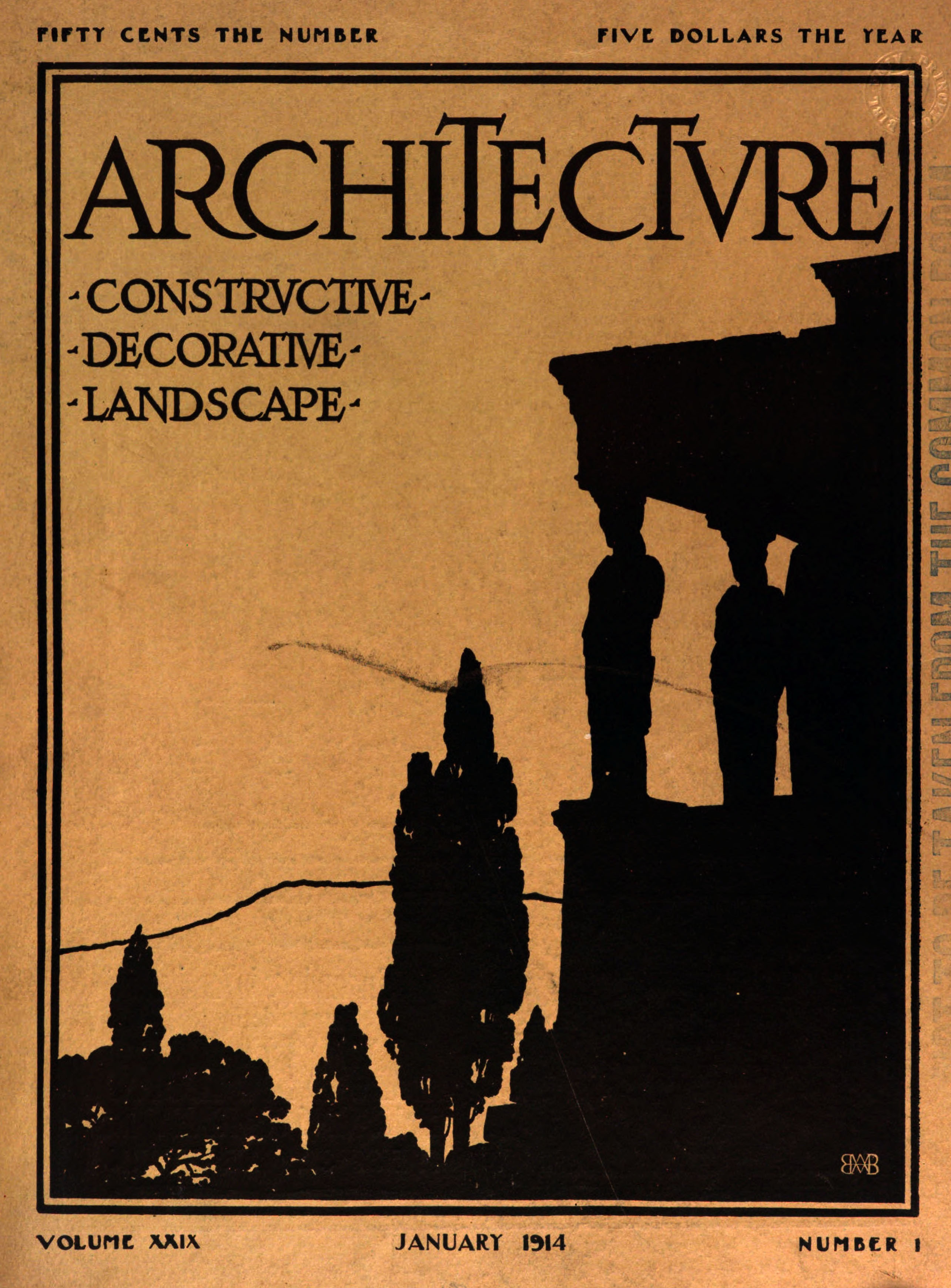
- 1914 cover
- Editor: A. Holland Forbes (1900–1903)
- Categories: Architecture
- Frequency: Monthly
- First issue: January 15, 1900
- Final issue: May 1936
- Company: Forbes & Co., Ltd. (1900); Charles Scribner's Sons (1917)
- Country: United States
- Based in: New York, NY
- Language: English

Architecture was a monthly magazine on architecture, established by A. Holland Forbes in 1900 with its first issue dated January 15. Each issue was lavishly illustrated with photographs and architectural drawings. The magazine was published by Forbes & Company, Ltd., initially located at 160 Fifth Avenue, New York, and beginning with the issue of May 15, 1907, at 225 Fifth Avenue. A. Holland Forbes was listed on the masthead as the editor until June 15, 1903, when these duties were taken over by a Board of Architects "in the interests of the profession."

In the July 1917 issue, it was announced that Charles Scribner's Sons had purchased Forbes & Company, Ltd., and that Architecture would thereafter be published by them. The last issue appears to have been published in May 1936.

== See also ==
- List of architecture magazines
