= SOILED =

Architecture magazine

- Architect/Educator: Joseph Altshuler
- Graphic designer: Matthew Harlan
- Writer and editor: Hollen Reischer
- Editorial assistant/Collaborator: Mariel Tishma
- Categories: Architecture
- Frequency: Annually
- Founder: Joseph Altshuler
- First issue: 2010; 16 years ago
- Company: Could Be Design
- Country: United States
- Based in: Chicago
- Language: English
- Website: soiledzine.org
- ISSN: 2375-3072
- OCLC: 794344686

SOILED is an architecture magazine released periodically that centers on architecture, design, and the interactions between humans and space. It incorporates the visual elements of design magazines and publishes original writing in the style of a literary magazine. It aims to break down boundaries between architects and non-architects through this combination. Its open submission format allows the publication "to extend the architectural dialogue beyond the community of the discipline to engage the larger public."

SOILED is produced out of the archizine tradition. This movement aims to "celebrate(s) and promote(s) the recent resurgence of alternative and independent architectural publishing from around the world." Archinect, a network of architecture professionals, said of the magazine, "SOILED gets its hands dirty unknitting the systems-fabric of the built environment's varied networks, through whatever collaborative means necessary."

The magazine, started in 2011, is based in Chicago, Illinois and published by the design practice Could Be Architecture. In 2013, the magazine pursued a Kickstarter campaign in order to fund production. There the team cited its mission as: "SOILED aims to push the potential of the printed page and reconnect with the materials and landscape from which its content originates." The magazine remains supported by donations at present.

To date, the magazine has published seven issues — Groundscrapers, Skinscrapers, Platescrapers, Windowscrapers, Cloudscrapers, Deathscrapers, and Animatescrapers. The publication is run by an all-volunteer team and releases issues annually.

It has been featured in exhibitions like Archzines and the Chicago Architecture Biennial. Issues and their releases have been featured in publications like Architizer and Coverjunkie.
