= Architecture: The AIA Journal =

American architecture magazine

Architecture
- Categories: Architecture
- Frequency: Monthly
- Founded: 1899
- Final issue: 2006
- Country: United States
- Based in: Washington, DC
- Language: English
- ISSN: 0746-0554

Architecture: the AIA journal was a monthly magazine published by the American Institute of Architects under various titles from 1899 to 2006.

== History ==
In 1899, The American Institute of Architects Quarterly Bulletin OCLC 4411296 was authorized.

In April 1900, The American Institute of Architects Quarterly Bulletin first issue appeared.

In 1913, Journal of the American Institute of Architects (Vol. #1, Issue #1) began, replacing the Quarterly Bulletin.

In 1929, The Octagon began, replacing the Journal of the American Institute of Architects.

In 1944, Journal of the American Institute of Architects began, replacing The Octagon.

In 1957, AIA Journal began, replacing the Journal of the American Institute of Architects.

In August 1976, publication of the AIA Journal ended. Then, Architecture was the official magazine of the American Institute of Architects.

In 1996, the Progressive Architecture magazine name and subscriber list was sold to BPI Communications, by Penton Publishing.

Until the end of 1996, Architecture, owned by BPI Communications, was the official magazine of the American Institute of Architects.

In 1997, Architectural Record became the official magazine of the American Institute of Architects.

In 2006, Architecture magazine was purchased and closed by Hanley-Wood, which replaced the magazine with a new title, Architect Magazine.

== See also ==
- List of architecture magazines#United States
