= Henry Zankov =

Russian-born American fashion designer

- Born: 1980 or 1981 (age 45–46); Saint Petersburg, Russia
- Education: Fashion Institute of Technology
- Label: Zankov
- Awards: CFDA American Emerging Designer of the Year (2024)
- Website: zankovstudio.com

Henry Zankov (born 1980 or 1981) is a Russian-born American fashion designer based in New York City. He founded the knitwear label Zankov in 2020, and in was named artistic director of Diane von Furstenberg in 2026.

Zankov was a runner-up for the 2023 CFDA/Vogue Fashion Fund and won the CFDA's American Emerging Designer of the Year award in 2024.

== Early life and education ==
Zankov was born in Saint Petersburg, Russia, and emigrated with his family to the United States at the age of nine. The family settled in Teaneck, New Jersey, chosen for its Jewish community and its proximity to relatives on his mother's side. He arrived speaking no English and learned about American culture largely through MTV; he also followed fashion programs such as FashionTelevision and Style with Elsa Klensch. As a child, he ran a make-believe clothing store from his bedroom, sketching designs and compiling a catalog. In 1994, at age 13, he watched a Donna Karan fashion show on television and decided he wanted to work in fashion.

While in high school, Zankov took sewing classes at the Fashion Institute of Technology (FIT), and on weekends he took the bus into Manhattan, where the Comme des Garçons store in SoHo made an impression on him. He enrolled at FIT to study women's design and gravitated toward knitwear. Encouraged by a professor, he interned at the cashmere label TSE, where he worked with luxury yarns and learned stitch technologies and handwork.

== Career ==
=== Early career ===
After graduating, Zankov joined Donna Karan as an assistant menswear designer, arriving, as he has recalled, "at the height of Donna Karan, just after LVMH bought the brand". He spent five years on the design teams at Donna Karan and DKNY, and later worked for Edun. In 2014, he joined Diane von Furstenberg (DVF) as design director of knitwear under then-creative director Jonathan Saunders, and stayed for four years. Zankov has said that working with von Furstenberg opened his eyes to color: "I was always afraid of it. I'm grateful for that opportunity to have somebody open my eyes when it comes to color." He also teaches at Parsons School of Design.

=== Zankov label ===
Zankov launched his own label, stylized ZANKOV, in February 2020 with a capsule of six sweaters for men and women. When the COVID-19 pandemic began weeks later, he repurposed the label's sweaters into pillows and blankets, which sold to a homebound audience. The label took its first wholesale account, Net-a-Porter, in 2021, and later produced a capsule sold at Bergdorf Goodman in collaboration with female immigrants from Russia and Georgia.

In 2023, Zankov was named a runner-up for the CFDA/Vogue Fashion Fund, receiving $100,000 and business mentorship; Melitta Baumeister won the top prize that year, and Rachel Scott of Diotima was the other runner-up. The label showed seasonal collections at New York Fashion Week, among them "You Found Me" for Spring/Summer 2025, presented in September 2024 on padel courts near the High Line and inspired by the post-punk and alternative rock bands Zankov had listened to in his school years, including Sonic Youth and The Breeders. In October 2024, he won the American Emerging Designer of the Year award at the CFDA Fashion Awards.

Zankov staged the label's first runway show in September 2025, for the Spring/Summer 2026 season, after several seasons of smaller presentations. The collection moved beyond knitwear into beading, embroidery, and tailoring, part of what Zankov has called "completing the wardrobe". A second runway show followed in February 2026, for Fall/Winter 2026, with mohair skirts and tops, modern takes on argyle in chartreuse and merlot, and paillette-covered pieces. Sweaters are priced in the mid-hundreds of dollars, with dresses and skirts in the thousands.

Zankov belongs to a circle of New York designers that includes Christopher John Rogers, who once worked as his assistant at DVF and whose knitwear Zankov has consulted on, and Rachel Scott of Diotima; Zankov and Scott shared a sales agent and held early presentations together. His collaborators have included eyewear designer Selima Salaun of Selima Optique and musician Troye Sivan, who became a fan of the label after buying one of its blankets during the pandemic.

In October 2026, the label appointed Jack Tobin as its first chief executive officer and business partner; over the previous two years, its international business had grown more than tenfold and its stockist network had doubled, adding retailers including Selfridges and Harrods in London and Galeries Lafayette in Paris.

=== Diane von Furstenberg ===
In September 2025, Zankov returned to DVF to design a capsule collection, DVF x Henry Zankov, which debuted at Bergdorf Goodman. In May 2026, the company named him its first artistic director, a newly created role with oversight of the brand's creative output from collections to visual identity. Nathan Jenden, who had returned to DVF in January 2024, continued as creative director, reporting to Zankov. Zankov kept designing his own label, moving its operations from Brooklyn into DVF's headquarters in the Meatpacking District.

Zankov's debut collection for DVF, for Spring/Summer 2027, was shown on September 10, 2026, on the High Line. A theme of "wrapping the body" ran through the collection, a nod to the wrap dress von Furstenberg introduced in 1974.

== Design approach ==
Zankov has called himself a "knitwear geek" and has said he avoids a traditional idea of what knitwear is: "We'll probably never do a fisherman or cable-knit sweater, or if we do it will be in our own way." His collections combine natural fibers such as virgin wool, mohair, merino, and alpaca with technical yarns, using techniques including intarsia, double-knit jacquard, and digital printing. He has cited Marimekko and Issey Miyake as models for building a recognizable brand, and his references include art, sculpture, 1960s typography, interior design, and the work of artists such as Fernand Léger, Pablo Picasso, Ellsworth Kelly, and Jasper Johns. His stated rule for color is that "it can be loud, but it can't be tacky".

The label's Fall/Winter 2024 collection was titled "Hold Me Closer", after customers told Zankov his clothes "feel like a hug". Its palette drew on the textiles and decor of Memphis Group co-founder Nathalie Du Pasquier, whose compositions mix bright colors with unexpected browns and grays. Zankov has said he likes combinations that are "not supposed to work together", because of the tension they create. Steven Kolb, chief executive of the CFDA, has described Zankov's strength as the way he "balances color, texture, and form".
