= Apollo-Optik =

German optician and eyewear retail chain owned by EssilorLuxottica

Apollo-Optik GmbH & Co. KG
- Type: GmbH & Co. KG
- Industry: Retail, health care
- Founded: 1972
- Headquarters: Schwabach, Germany
- Key people: Jörg Ehmer, chairman
- Services: Ophthalmic opticians, prescription eyewear and sunglass retail
- Revenue: €355 million (2009)
- Number of employees: 3,600
- Website: www.apollo.de

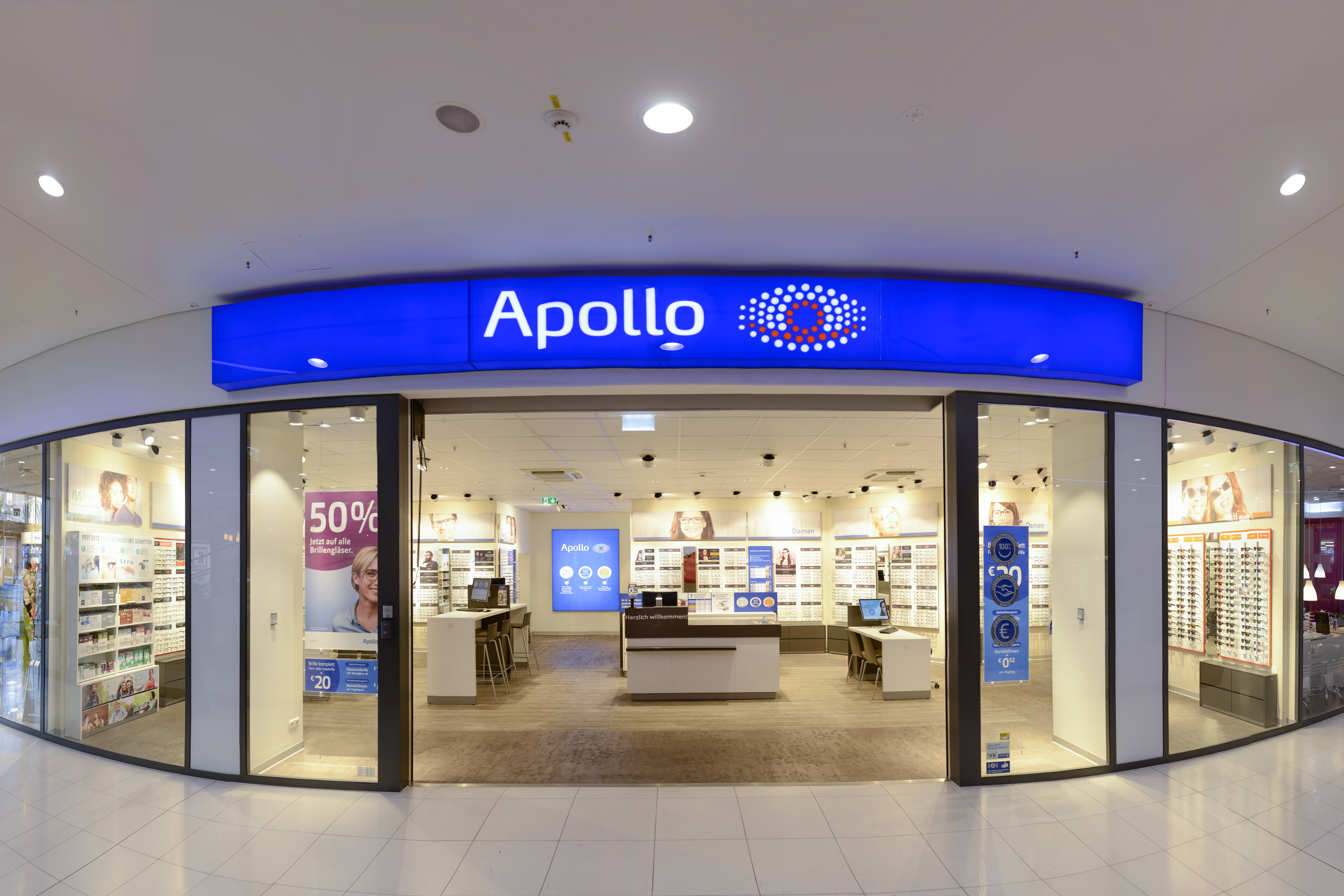
Apollo-Optik store

Apollo-Optik GmbH & Co. KG is a German optical retail company headquartered in Schwabach, Bavaria. It operates a nationwide chain of optical stores offering prescription eyewear, sunglasses, contact lenses and related optical services, as well as hearing-care services at some locations.

== History ==
Apollo Optik was founded 1972 in Schwabach and is operating in 40 countries.
