= Bernhard Baumeister =

German actor (1827–1917)

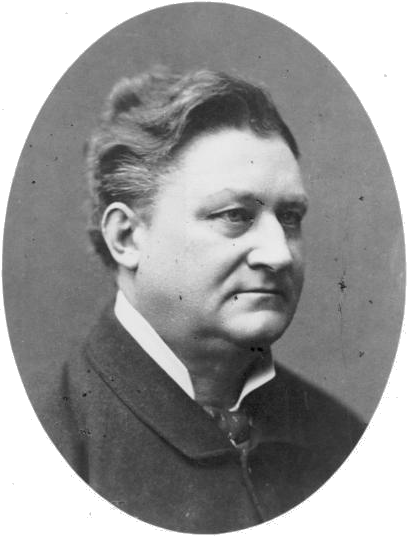
Photograph by Rudolf Krziwanek

Bernhard Baumeister (28 September 1827 – 25 October 1917) was a German actor, working for most of his career at the Burgtheater in Vienna.

He was born in Posen (now Poznań in Poland), son of a military official. Aged fifteen he appeared with an older brother at the court theatre in Schwerin; afterwards he played in various towns in Pomerania, and in 1849 in the court theatre of Hanover. From 1850 to 1852 he was at the Grand Ducal Theatre in Oldenburg.

After appearing in 1852 as a guest player at the Burgtheater in Vienna, Baumeister was engaged with the theatre by Heinrich Laube. He remained there until 1915, during this time playing more than 500 roles. He was known particularly for his portrayal of Falstaff; other notable roles included Werner in Minna von Barnhelm, the title roles in The Mayor of Zalamea and Otto Ludwig's play Der Erbförster, Walter Fürst in William Tell, Kapuziner in Wallensteins Lager and the title role in Götz von Berlichingen.

From 1874 he also taught at the Vienna Conservatory. He died in 1917 in Baden bei Wien.
