= Melitta Baumeister =

German fashion designer (born 1986)

- Born: 1986 (age 39–40)
- Education: Pforzheim University of Applied Sciences; Parsons School of Design (MFA)
- Label: Melitta Baumeister
- Partner: Michal Plata
- Awards: Winner, CFDA/Vogue Fashion Fund (2023); National Design Award for Fashion Design (2025)
- Website: melittabaumeister.com

Melitta Baumeister (born 1986) is a German fashion designer based in New York City. She founded her eponymous label in 2013 after graduating from the MFA Fashion Design and Society program at Parsons School of Design, and presented her first collection at New York Fashion Week in February 2014. Her designs are known for sculptural silhouettes that exaggerate volume, built with experimental materials and techniques. She won the CFDA/Vogue Fashion Fund in 2023 and the National Design Award for Fashion Design in 2025.

Rihanna wore a jacket from Baumeister's debut collection during Paris Fashion Week, and Dover Street Market was the first retailer to carry the label. She was a semi-finalist for the 2016 LVMH Prize. In 2026, the Costume Institute at the Metropolitan Museum of Art acquired her "Venus" dress and showed it in the exhibition Costume Art.

== Early life and education ==
Baumeister was born in 1986 and grew up in a small town in the Black Forest region of southern Germany. She went to tailoring school at sixteen, trained as a seamstress, and studied fashion design at the Pforzheim University of Applied Sciences, a school she has described as influenced by the Bauhaus, where the coursework began with painting and sculpture rather than fashion.

Shelley Fox, the founder and then director of the new master's program in Fashion Design and Society at Parsons, saw Baumeister's graduation collection while touring design schools, and a full scholarship persuaded her to move to New York. She graduated from the program's inaugural class in 2013, and her graduation collection was shown at New York Fashion Week, where she met the visual artist Paul Jung, a fashion photography MFA graduate of the School of Visual Arts.

== Career ==
=== Founding the label ===
Baumeister founded her label in New York in 2013 with Jung, though she has said she never planned to start a brand and expected to take a job at a Paris fashion house after graduating. After the director of VFiles saw her graduation show, he invited her to present her first collection, for Fall/Winter 2014, in the platform's group show at New York Fashion Week in February 2014. Mel Ottenberg, then Rihanna's stylist, wanted to borrow the entire collection; Baumeister could not afford to transport it and sent a single jacket, an oversized neoprene bomber that Rihanna wore to the Comme des Garçons show during Paris Fashion Week. Dover Street Market's New York, London, and Ginza stores were the first to carry the collection.

The label was selected for the 2015 Vogue Talents in Dubai, and Baumeister's work was featured in the 2016 design triennial exhibition at Cooper Hewitt, Smithsonian Design Museum. In 2016 she was a semi-finalist for the LVMH Prize.

In the mid-2010s, Baumeister's partner Michal Plata joined the label as art director. Plata, who is Polish, had studied car design at Pforzheim at the same time as Baumeister, though the two did not know each other then; they got together years later, when a delayed production left her stranded in Łódź over Christmas and he drove over in a rental car to keep her company. He had previously worked as a car and context designer at BMW Advanced Design, and he has since built the label's shop interiors and photographed its lookbooks himself.

The label went on to present its collections in Paris. When Baumeister and Plata presented the Fall/Winter 2018 collection there, Rei Kawakubo and Adrian Joffe visited the showroom to congratulate them. The label is independently financed. For years it produced its collections in Manhattan's Garment District, before moving production to Asia in 2024. During the COVID-19 pandemic, the label began connecting directly with its customers, whom Baumeister has described as entrepreneurs and self-made women, architects and art collectors among them.

=== CFDA/Vogue Fashion Fund ===
In September 2023, Baumeister returned to New York Fashion Week for the first time since 2014, making her solo debut with a Spring 2024 presentation in Chinatown as a nominee for the 2023 CFDA/Vogue Fashion Fund. On October 19, 2023, she was named the winner of the fund's 19th edition, receiving $300,000 and business mentorship; Linda Evangelista presented the prize at Vogue's Forces of Fashion event at One World Trade Center, and Henry Zankov of Zankov and Rachel Scott of Diotima were named runners-up. Bergdorf Goodman had picked up the line shortly before the win. For Fall 2024, Baumeister skipped the runway and released a lookbook with a series of TikTok-style videos instead.

=== Runway debut and recent work ===
Baumeister staged her first runway show on September 11, 2024, taking the closing slot of New York Fashion Week with a sport-themed Spring 2025 collection opened by the Paralympic athlete Scout Bassett. The Spring 2026 collection continued the sports theme ahead of the label's running-shoe collaboration with Nike, the first partnership the company had made around a performance sneaker.

Called "Run Like No One Is Watching", the project launched in the fall of 2025 with an event in New York that combined performance and footwear presentation. The hand-painted Vomero Premium and Pegasus Premium, in "Total Orange" and "Volt" colorways, were released in April 2026 through the label's website and SNKRS, the Pegasus Premium having been previewed with the Fall 2026 lookbook. The shoes carry graphics of Baumeister's own eyes, and the first online drop sold out within six minutes.

In 2026, the Costume Institute at the Metropolitan Museum of Art acquired the label's "Venus" dress, from the Fall/Winter 2022–23 collection, and displayed it in Costume Art.

== Design approach ==
Baumeister has called her approach "shape-driven", saying that she tries "to push fashion in terms of shape" and to make "shapes that are new and surprising". She has said that "sculpture has always been my main point", and rather than starting from sketches she works directly on the body, draping on herself to feel how the fabric moves.

The debut collection established the label's vocabulary of materials: boxy vinyl motorcycle jackets, silicone-cast cable-knit sweaters, and cropped tops decorated with clusters of cast bananas. The banana motif, she has said, began with blackened bananas on her kitchen table, an image of time passing, with reference points from Andy Warhol to Maurizio Cattelan. Accordion pleating and lampshade hemlines with foam inserts became recurring techniques, alongside materials such as crunchy nylon, foam padding, and a bomber jacket made from Tyvek, the material used for FedEx mailers.

Humor is a stated part of the work: "I do feel like we have a lot of humor in our collections", she said in 2024. Baumeister has named Martin Margiela, Rick Owens, and Simone Rocha as designers she admires.

== Awards ==
Baumeister was a semi-finalist for the LVMH Prize in 2016. She won the 2023 CFDA/Vogue Fashion Fund, with a $300,000 prize and business mentorship. In 2025 she received the National Design Award for Fashion Design from Cooper Hewitt, Smithsonian Design Museum, announced in January and presented at an April 3 dinner marking the awards' 25th anniversary.
