= Junk Jet =

German non-commercial publication platform

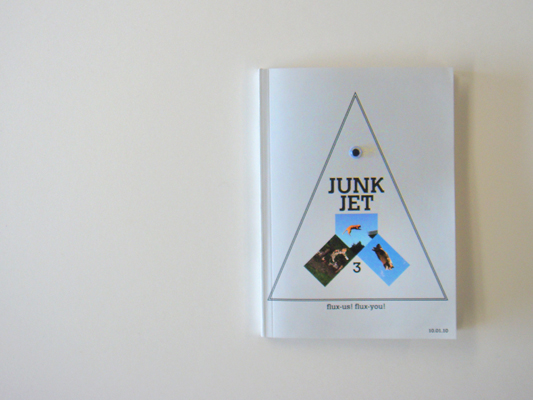
- Cover of Junk Jet n°3
- Editor in Chief: Mona Mahall, Asli Serbest
- Categories: Art, Architecture, New media
- Frequency: irregular
- Publisher: igmade.edition
- First issue: 2007
- Country: Germany
- Based in: Stuttgart
- Language: English
- Website: Junk Jet
- ISSN: 1865-9357

Junk Jet is a non-commercial publication platform, a collaborative format set up to discuss speculative works on topics of art, architecture and electronic media. It is published by independent igmade.edition, edited and designed by Mona Mahall and Asli Serbest (m-a-u-s-e-r).

== History ==
Self-published Magazine Junk Jet is founded in 2007 by the Berlin-based architects Mona Mahall and Asli Serbest. The magazine is part of the duo's research-based practice in architecture, exhibitions, and installations.

== Issues ==
Issue	Theme	Date	Description	Pages	Measurements	ISBN
1	Noise and failure	November 2007	JJ wants to capture and transfer junk’s ambiguities indicating non- function, or at least bad-function implied in the nature of technology, and various forms of mis-use for aesthetic purposes. What could be the aesthetic (non-) function of junk within clean computational aesthetics of electronic media? Therefore, relevant fields are all sorts of re-use, of wrong- and non-use, and of tinkering (bricoler, basteln) of forms and found objects, of theories and (small) narratives, of fashions and styles, and of course of computers and other electronic devices.	69	25 x 20 x 0.5 cm	
2	Speculative architecture	November 2008	For the second issue, Junk Jet was looking for the Speculative, focusing on works of unpredictable architectures and volatile spaces within real and virtual environments. The speculative haunts all systems of production, threatens them with the destruction of their order and with collapse. It continues to appear to all orthodoxies as artifice, as a black magic, which is to be unveiled, because it is somehow effective in an illusive, but absorbing way, which is characteristic to an occasion for a game and its stakes. It is not a rational process, but something that contradicts this frame, something that is recognized as irrational, as feverish, and that therefore is suspected to be dysfunctional, inhuman, or even monstrous.	100	24 x 16.5 x 0.7 cm	
3	Flux us flux you	February 2010	Junk Jet n°3 asked for fluxing architectures, boogie, buildings, rolling rocks, flying architectures, provisory pyramids, and temporary eternities; for all kinds of practical concepts and conceptual practices, for stable happenings and unstable thoughts, for lifted cellars and dugin landmarks, for curtains, mobiles, house boats, bubbles, zeppelins, flying saucers ...	120	18 x 13 x 1 cm	ISBN 978-3-00-030127-8
4	Statistics of mystics	October 2010	works and theories that make 1 become 2, 2 become 3, 3 ..., works that make something out of nothing or nothing out of something, that discover new – even if microscaled – galaxies, that believe in alchemy and maintain a certain kind of apocalyptic thought; works that move from mumbo-jumbo to real magic and back.	88	27 x 19 x 1 cm	ISBN 978-3-00-032228-0
5	Net heart	2012	Transfers internet things from their digital space into printed media. Collection of objects, internet blogs, and animations into a magazine of archived bits of the web.			
6	Here and Where	December 2012	About the local in the global culture.	144	14.8 x 10.5 x 0.8 cm	ISBN 978-3-9814748-2-4
