= AG magazin =

Serbian periodical

AG magazin is a Serbian magazine for architecture and construction, founded in 2001. The magazine was created for the purposes of revealing new information about world projects, new engineering achievements, trends in house building and environmental issues. It is based in Belgrade.
