= CU Writer =

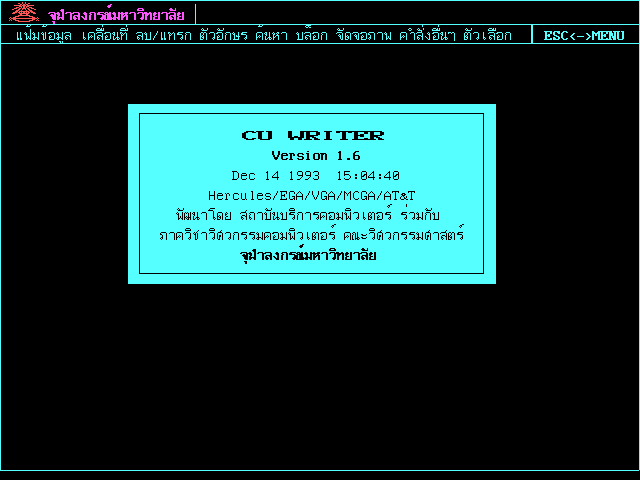

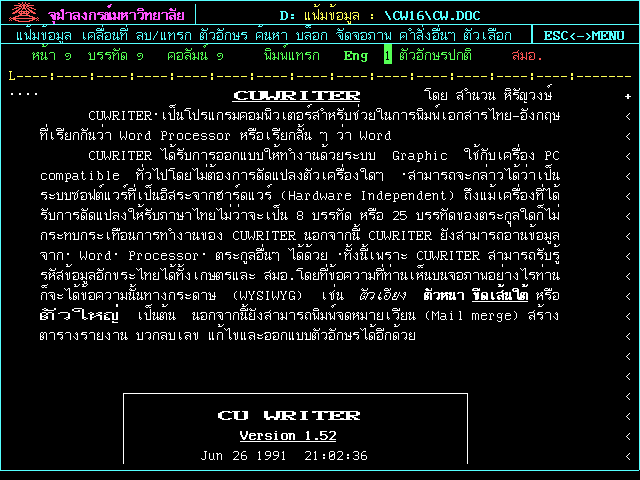
- Document editing screen
- Original author: Sumnuan Hirunwong
- Developer: Chulalongkorn University
- Initial release: April 1989
- Stable release: 1.6 / December 1993
- Written in: C and Assembly
- Operating system: MS-DOS
- Platform: IBM PC compatible
- Size: 1.17 MB
- Available in: Thai, English
- Type: Word processor
- License: Public domain

CU Writer, also known as "Word Chula", is a word processor capable of Thai language processing. First released to the public domain in 1989, the application runs on IBM PC compatibles, originally with Hercules graphics card. Later versions support VGA, EGA, EDA, and other graphic technologies. CU Writer was one of the most popular word processors in Thailand until Windows supplanted MS-DOS.
