= Edward Baumeister =

American politician

E. Baumeister
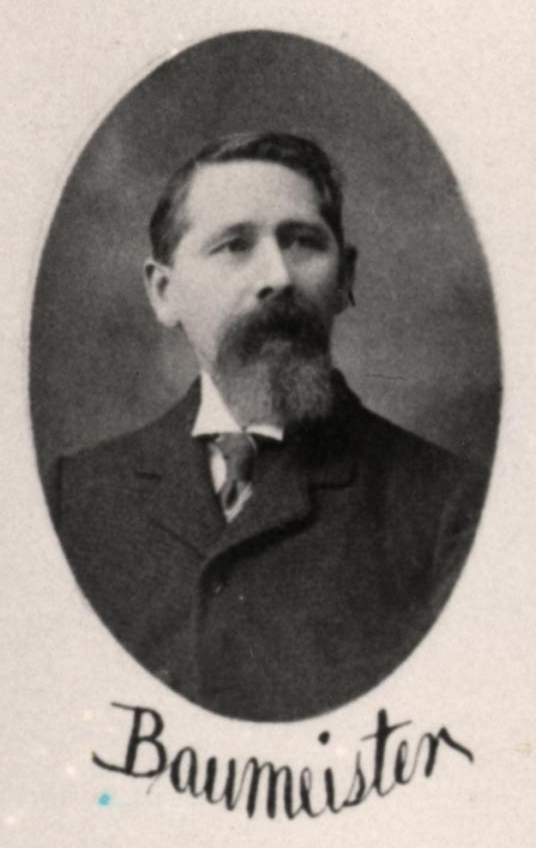
- Baumeister in 1901

Member of the Washington State Senate
- In office 1901–1903 (8th district); 1903–1905 (10th district)

Personal details
- Born: June 24, 1848 Saxe-Weimar, Kingdom of Prussia
- Died: May 26, 1933 (aged 84) Pullman, Washington, United States
- Party: Republican

Edward Baumeister (June 24, 1848 – May 26, 1933) was an American politician in the state of Washington. He served in the Washington State Senate from 1901 to 1905.
