= Ralf Baumeister =

German professor

- Born: September 1, 1961 (age 64)
- Citizenship: Germany
- Education: University of Erlangen, Germany Karolinska Institute, Stockholm; University of Berlin
- Awards: Philip-Morris Research Prize Alzheimer Research Prize by the Hans- and Ilse Breuer Foundation
- Scientific career
- Fields: Diseases, Drug Discovery, mTORC2, Autophagy
- Website: https://celegans.de/

Ralf Baumeister (born September 1, 1961 in Schwabach) is a German professor (Bioinformatics and Molecular Genetics).

He is currently co-director of the School of Life Sciences at Freiburg University's Institute of Advanced Studies. He uses the model organism Caenorhabditis elegans in his studies.
