= POL Oxygen =

Defunct magazine

POL Oxygen was an international design, art and architecture quarterly magazine. The magazine existed between 2001 and 2008. It contained extended profiles that look at the lives, ideas and work of people working internationally. It was edited in Sydney, art directed in London, printed in Hong Kong and distributed worldwide.
