= Reinhard Baumeister =

German engineer and urban planner (1833–1917)

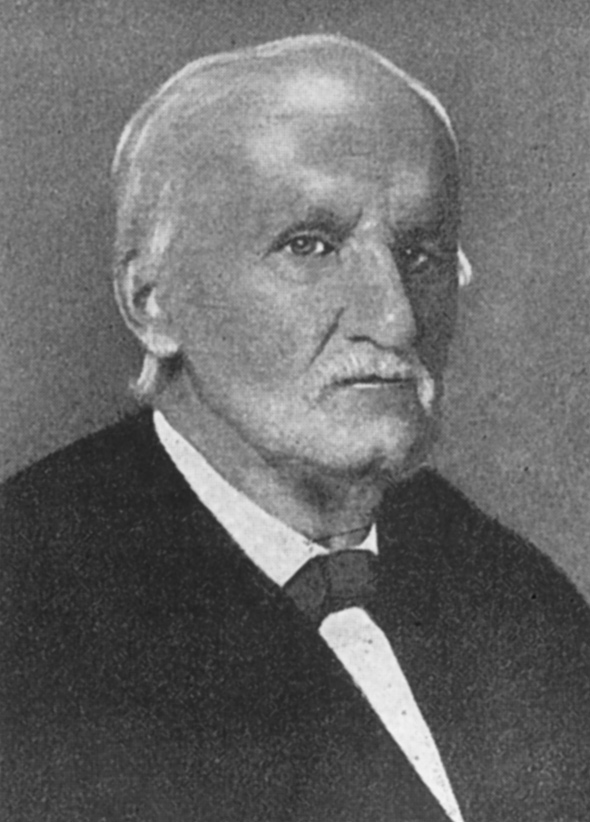
Reinhard Baumeister

Reinhard Baumeister (19 March 1833 in Hamburg – 11 February 1917 in Karlsruhe) was a German engineer and urban planner, the author of one of the earliest texts on urban planning Stadterweiterungen in technischer, baupolizeilicher und Wirtschaftlicher Beziehung (Town extensions: their links with technical and economic concerns and with building regulations) published in 1876. It was used as a textbook at the first urban planning course in Germany, at the college of technology in Aachen in 1880. An early translation of one of his writings into English was The Cleaning and Sewerage of Cities published in New York in 1891.

== Biography ==
Baumeister was a professor of civil engineering with experience in railway construction when he entered the field of planning by winning the 1872 competition for the urban extension of Mannheim.
