= Christian Baumeister =

German film director

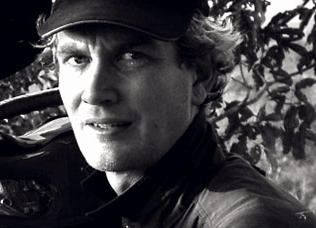
Christian Baumeister, producer, director and cinematographer

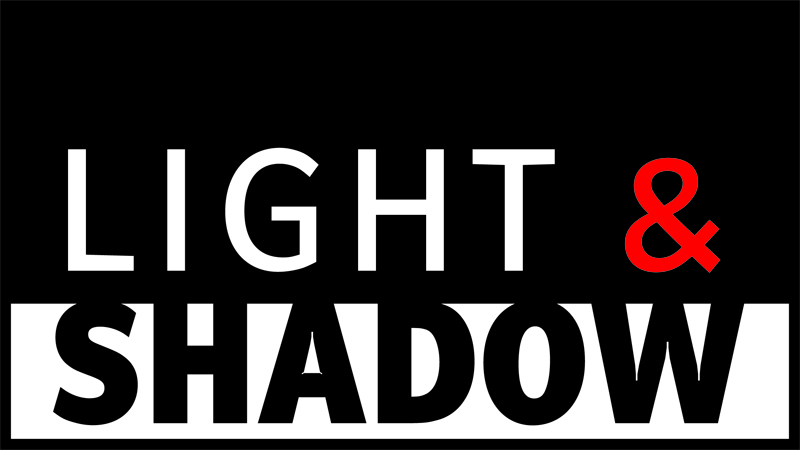
Light & Shadow Productions

Christian Baumeister (born 24 December 1971 in Münster) is a German cinematographer and award-winning director focusing on nature and wildlife productions.

== Career ==
Baumeister studied biology in Germany and wildlife filmmaking in the United Kingdom. He lived for eight years in Brazil and he is specialized in filming in Latin America.

In 2001 he established his own production company, Light & Shadow GmbH, with an office in Münster, Germany. In the past years, Baumeister has garnered international acclaim for his wildlife films, from audiences and critics around the world. His previous projects took him to Europe, Asia, Africa and South America. He has established himself with productions on the international television market and works with broadcasters such as ARD, ZDF, BBC, NDR, ARTE, ORF, Discovery Channel, Smithsonian Institution and Channel and the National Geographic Channel.

For his series about the Andes Mountains, Baumeister was nominated for "Outstanding Cinematography" and "Outstanding Music & Sound" at the 40th News & Documentary EMMY Awards 2019 in the US.

Currently he is producing a 6-part series about Europe's nature and wildlife.

== Filmography ==
=== Wildlife Series ===
- 2025: EUROPE - One Continent - Five Worlds 6 x 50 / 1 x 90 min - LIGHT & SHADOW for ARD, WDR, NDR, arte, ORF, hr, SVT, YLE, DR, NKR.
- 2022: Wild Argentina (UHD) 3 x 50 min / 1 x 90 min - LIGHT & SHADOW for WDR, NDR Naturfilm, arte, ORF and National Geographic
- 2018: The Wild Andes (UHD) 3 x 50 min / 1 x 90 min: LIGHT & SHADOW for WDR, Smithsonian Channel, NDR Naturfilm / Doclights, arte, ORF, SVT, SRF, Autentic Distribution
- 2014: Wild Brazil (HD) 5 x 50 min: LIGHT & SHADOW for Terra Mater Factual Studios, National Geographic Wild
- 2010: Amazon Alive (HD) 3 x 45 min: LIGHT & SHADOW for NDR Naturfilm, Arte, ORF, Parthenon Entertainment Ltd. / National Geographic Channel International, Animal Planet

=== Producer, Director & Cinematographer ===
- 2022: Nature's Magic Moments (UHD) 50 min - LIGHT & SHADOW for WDR, NDR, arte
- 2020: Accidental Wilderness - Europe's Everglades (UHD) 50 min - LIGHT & SHADOW for WDR, arte and Love Nature
- 2019: Portugal - Europe's Wild West (UHD) 50 min - LIGHT & SHADOW for WDR, NDR Naturfilm
- 2016: Iron Jungle - Nature's Return to the Ruhr Valley (HD) 43 min - LIGHT & SHADOW for WDR, NDR Naturfilm, Albatross World Sales
- 2012: Raccoons - The New Europeans (HD) 43 min - (director: Heiko de Groot) LIGHT & SHADOW for WDR, NDR Naturfilm, Albatross World Sales
- 2011: Jaguar – One Strike to the Kill - (HD) 50 min - LIGHT & SHADOW for NDR Naturfilm, Arte, National Geographic Channel
- 2011: Europe's Last Wild Horses - (HD) 50 min - LIGHT & SHADOW for WDR, NDR Naturfilm, Off-the-Fence
- 2010: The Real Guinea Pig - (HD) 43 min (Regie: Herbert Ostwald) - LIGHT & SHADOW for ZDF, Arte, ZDF Enterprises
- 2010: Russland – Im Reich der Tiger, Bären und Vulkane (cinema) 91 min - Narrator: Siegfried Rauch
- 2008: Kamchatka^{[1]} – Land of fire and Ice (HD) 50 min - LIGHT & SHADOW for NDR Naturfilm, WDR, Parthenon Entertainment, NGCI, Animal Planet US
- 2006: The Falls of Iguacu (HD) 50 min - LIGHT & SHADOW for NDR, BBC, ORF and Parthenon Entertainment / NGCI (HD)
- 2004: Wild Rio (HD) 50 min - LIGHT & SHADOW for NDR Naturfilm, ORF, Parthenon Entertainment Ltd. / National Geographic Channel International
- 2002: Viva Vicuña (HD) 50 min - LIGHT & SHADOW for ZDF, ARTE & Discovery Communications

=== Director of Photography ===
- 2005: Lang Lang in China (HD) - Nightfrog for ARD / Deutsche Grammophon

=== Cinematographer ===
- 2003: Camels - NDR Naturfilm for Parthenon Entertainment / NGCI
- 2002: Eaten Alive - BBC-NHU
- 2001: Bloody Suckers - NHNZ for PBS
- 1999: Wild Sex - NHNZ for Discovery Communications
- 1999: A Wild Life - NHNZ for Discovery Communications
- 1997: Skoovsgaard - Four-part series; Loke Film for TV2

=== Additional Photography/ Camera Assistant ===
- 2000: Inca Animals - Heinz von Matthey for ZDF, ORF & Discovery Communications Inc.
- 1998: Lions of Etosha - Rudolph Lammers for ZDF
- 1998: Animal Hospital - Engstfeld Film for ZDF
- 1998: Fabulous Animals - Gruppe 5 for WDR & CANAL+
- 1997: Dr. Knock - Dominic Graf for BR

== Awards (Selection) ==
  - Jackson Wild Film Festival 2025 - Nomination for Best Cinematography Link
  - 40th NEWS & DOCUMENTARY EMMY AWARD Nomination, USA, 2019 * Outstanding Music & Sound * Outstanding Cinematography
  - UNITED NATIONS - International Forest Film Awards, Special Jury Award 2010
  - New York Festivals 2019 TV & FILM Awards * SILVER MEDAL NATURE AND WILDLIFE * SILVER MEDAL FEATURE DOC * GOLD MEDAL CINEMATOGRAPHY
  - World Media Festival, Hamburg 2019 * INTERMEDIA AWARD GOLD, Nature & Wildlife
  - Green Screen, Deutschland, 2011: SH:Z Publikumspreis
  - Darsser Naturfilmfestival, Deutschland, 2011: Tiere und Lebensräume
  - Durban Wild Talk Africa, South Africa, 2011, Drehbuchpreis
  - FIFA / Albert, France, 2012, Wissenschaftspreis, Spezialpreis für das beste Drehbuch
  - Sichuan TV Festival, China, 2011, Finalist (Beste Kamera)
  - Namur, Belgium, 2011, Großer Preiis
  - New York Festivals Television Broadcasting, USA, 2008: SILVER WORLD MEDAL NATURE & WILDLIFE
  - Darsser Naturfilmfestival, Deutschland, 2007, Goldener Kranich
