= Art4d =

art4d is a magazine for Architecture, Design, Arts (11 annual issues, bilingual Thai-English). It was founded in 1995 and has been based in Bangkok, Thailand, since then. It is published by Corporation 4d, a Bangkok-based publisher specialized in architecture and design in Thailand. The magazine is devoted to architecture, interior design, product design, graphic design and arts. It focuses mainly on movements of design, artistic, and creative professional and participants in Thailand and Asia, especially Southeast Asia.

Since its beginning years, the editors of the magazine have constantly organized, with collaborations of private and public organizations, a series of cultural events to promote the community of design and artistic professional in Thailand as well as to connect the local community with an international scene. For example: Tomorrow Where Shall We Live? - a series of events held in Bangkok in 1996 with a lecture given by Toyo Ito and an architectural design workshop also guided by him, Bangkok on the Move: Cities on the Move 6 - a series of multi-media exhibitions designed to stimulate discussion of social changes and universal issues in visual and architectural cultures, curatorial concept by Hans Ulrich Obrist and Hou Hanru, scenography and co-curation by Ole Scheeren, held in Bangkok, Thailand, from 9–30 October 1999.

Since 2004, the magazine has organized Designers' Saturday - an annual lecture series about design, interior design and architecture held in Bangkok, inviting international architects and designers who are well known for their particular experimental approach. In 2007, it launched the first edition of Bangkok Design Festival - a yearly event about architecture, design, fashion and arts, together with Degree Show - an annual exhibition of selected final year student works with an open call for projects in seven design fields- architecture, interior, product, graphic, animation and motion graphic, fashion and jewelry - from all Thai universities. All of the three events are still held in Bangkok every year.

== See also ==
- List of architecture magazines
