= Product Sans =

Geometric sans-serif typeface by Google

- Category: Sans-serif
- Classification: Geometric
- Foundry: Google
- Date released: September 1, 2015
- License: Proprietary
- Design based on: Futura; Neuzeit Grotesk; Tempo; Avenir

Product Sans is a geometric sans-serif typeface created by Google for branding purposes. It replaced the old Google logo on September 1, 2015. As Google's branding was becoming more apparent on multiple device types, Google sought to adapt its design so that its logo could be portrayed in constrained spaces and remain consistent for its users across platforms.

== Design ==
The design team wanted to retain the simple and approachable styles in previous logos but also include geometric forms. It has been suggested that the design of Product Sans is inspired by Futura. The most notable difference between the two is the double-story 'a', which was implemented to contrast the circular shapes of the other characters. Product Sans prefers to end the stroke terminals at about 45 degrees, with the cut off being perpendicular to the tangent of the stroke.

Slight optical corrections were also made to the geometric forms. The uppercase "G" has its circular shape pulled inwards slightly where it meets the crossbar. The counters of the '6', '8', and '9' are almost perfect circles. These visual corrections were made for legibility.

== License ==
Product Sans is proprietary and was not released under an open source license. While variations of it have been freely released, Google has since reiterated Product Sans' status as a proprietary font.

== Usage ==
The Google logo used from September 1, 2015 to May 19, 2026

The Google logo used from 2015 to 2026 is based on Product Sans. Slight modifications do exist in the logo compared to the typeface; the most noticeable is the thickness and the slanted 'e'. The differences between the logo and Product Sans allows for distinction between the Google logotype and product name. Product Sans is mainly used in the text of Google's numerous services' logotypes such as Maps, Drive, News, and Earth. Variations such as Google Sans Text have become the standard user interface typeface for numerous services and applications, and the default typeface on Android devices with Google Pixel software.

== Google Sans ==
Google Sans
- Category: Geometric
- Foundry: Google; Colophon Foundry (now part of Monotype Imaging); Universal Thirst; Font Bureau; Pathfinders
- Date created: 2017
- Date released: December 10, 2025
- License: SIL Open Font License
- Design based on: Product Sans
- Variations: Google Sans Display; Google Sans Text; Google Sans Flex; Google Sans Code/Google Sans Mono

Google Sans is a size-optimized derivative of Product Sans designed for Google's customized and adapted version of Material Design, the "Google Material Theme". It was created in 2017 as a variable font alongside Google Sans Display, a variation designed for larger optical sizes. Notably, compared to Product Sans, Google Sans has a taller x-height, wider letterforms, among other changes, such as straightened terminals on some of the letters.

Other variants introduced later include Google Sans Text, a variation introduced in 2020 optimized for smaller optical sizes, and Google Sans Flex, a refactor utilizing the variable font technology created in 2024. Google Sans Mono, a fixed-width monospaced font was created in 2020, and was later overhauled into Google Sans Code, a programming-optimized version in 2025.

Google Sans Flex introduced multiple adjustable axes, including weight, width, optical size, and grade. It was designed to support modern responsive interfaces, utilizing variable axes to enable a wide range of typographic styles such as large display fonts and smaller user interface-oriented body fonts.

=== License ===
In August 2025, Google released Google Sans Code, a monospaced derivative of Google Sans designed for developer-facing and technical contexts, under the SIL Open Font License.

On November 18, 2025, Google released Google Sans Flex, a variable-font evolution of Google Sans, under the SIL Open Font License. Unlike Product Sans itself, Google Sans Flex is openly licensed and intended for broader typographic experimentation and use beyond Google’s internal branding systems.

On December 10, 2025, Google released Google Sans under the SIL Open Font License, marking the first time Google’s primary brand type family became widely available for public use.

== See also ==
- Cantarell (typeface)
- IBM Plex
- Roboto
- Noto fonts
- Segoe
- San Francisco (sans-serif typeface)
