= Lato (typeface) =

Humanist sans-serif typeface

- Category: Sans-serif
- Classification: Humanist
- Designer: Łukasz Dziedzic
- Date released: December 2010
- License: SIL Open Font License
- Website: www.latofonts.com/lato-free-fonts/
- Latest release version: 3.100.dev2

Lato is a humanist sans-serif typeface designed by Łukasz Dziedzic. It was released in 2010. The name "Lato" is Polish for "summer". Lato was published under the open-source Open Font License.

As of August 2018, Lato is used on more than 9.6 million websites, and is the third most served font on Google Fonts, with over one billion views per day.

== Use ==
Lato has been used in various physical publications, including information signs and election campaign billboards.

Lato has also been used for logotype of British international non-governmental organization (NGO) Save the Children since 2022.

== Development ==
Lato was created in 2010 for a Polish bank by Łukasz Dziedzic. When the bank changed its stylistic vision, he shelved the typeface, and released it later that year under the libre SIL Open Font License.

After Lato was added to Google Fonts it quickly gained popularity, becoming the third most used web font after Google's own Roboto and Open Sans, with over one billion views per day as of August 2018.

Carlito is a forked typeface, released by Google, that is very similar to Lato with metrics compatible with Microsoft's Calibri typeface.

== Language support ==
Lato supports all Latin alphabets, along with Cyrillic, Greek, and IPA. Lato was originally a type family of 400 symbols in 10 styles and is now 4000 symbols in 18 styles.

== Derivatives ==
Lato weights

Roman

Italic

The Lato typeface is available in nine weights from hairline to black, each of which has a distinct italic variant. Each of these 18 variants is additionally available in a Lato Latin version, containing just the subset of glyphs required for European languages based on the Latin alphabet; this allows for smaller file sizes.

An update to Lato was made in 2014 with additional glyphs. This updated version was marketed as "Lato 2.0".
