= Inter (typeface) =

- Category: Sans-serif
- Classification: Neo-grotesque
- Designer: Rasmus Andersson
- Date created: 2016
- Date released: August 22, 2017
- Glyphs: Over 2000
- License: SIL Open Font License
- Variations: Inter Tight, Inter Display
- Website: rsms.me/inter/ /rsms/inter on github
- Latest release version: 4.1
- Latest release date: November 16, 2024

Inter is a free and open-source neo-grotesque sans-serif typeface designed by Rasmus Andersson. Released in 2017, Inter was created to improve on-screen readability for user interface text, especially at small sizes. The typeface has since become widely used in applications and websites. Inter includes a wide range of OpenType features, support for over 140 languages, and is available as a variable font.

== Design characteristics ==
Inter was created during Andersson's tenure at Figma to address perceived limitations in existing typefaces like Roboto. The typeface is characterized by a tall x-height, open apertures, which make it optimized for readability on screens and at small text sizes. The variable font includes an optical size axis allowing it to adapt for readability at all font sizes, and a weight axis allowing the weight to be adjusted smoothly from Thin (100) to Black (900) without the need for additional font files.

Inter was initially metrically compatible with Roboto, but by 2018, it adopted its own vertical metrics and unique design features. The italics in Inter are true italics (rather than oblique type), and there is extensive support for Open Type features such as a choice between single and double story "a", tabular figures, square or round quote marks and commas, number variants, and various ligatures.

Inter is sometimes considered similar to the Apple system font, San Francisco.

== History ==
Inter was designed in 2016 by Rasmus Andersson who wanted a font that was easier to read on computer screens than Roboto while retaining its vertical proportions. Earlier versions of Inter (named "Interface" and "Inter UI") included glyphs and followed the vertical glyph metrics (ascender and descender) from Roboto, while Roboto glyphs were included as a fallback for characters that had not been redesigned in Inter.

Inter changed its vertical glyph metrics in 2018, making it different from that of Roboto. The typeface had to be released in two combined licenses: the SIL Open Font License for original glyph designs for Inter and Apache License for the fallback Roboto glyphs and outlines. This exception was removed in 2020 after Roboto was re-licensed from Apache to OFL.

== Variants ==
Inter Display is an experimental display version for large font sizes. This work has already been partially integrated into Inter with the introduction of optical sizing. Another variant with similar purpose, Inter Tight, was specifically designed for Google Workspace and other applications that do not support control over letter spacing. Inter Tight shares the same glyph shapes as Inter, while Inter Display contains redesigned glyphs.

GNOME uses Adwaita Sans which is a customized version of Inter.

The Inter files distributed by Google Fonts do not include many of Inter's font features, which have been removed to reduce the size of the files in order to make them faster to load.

== Usage ==
As well as serving as a UI typeface in applications such as Figma, Notion and Pixar Presto, and desktop environments Pantheon and GNOME, Inter is now found extensively on the internet, including high profile websites such as GitLab, ISO, Mozilla, and NASA.

Inter is one of the most widely used typefaces on the Internet. For the twelve months ending May 2025, Inter was accessed 414 billion times on Google Fonts, with 57% growth over the previous 12 months, making it the 16th most accessed font on Google Fonts.

Inter has been included in books on web development, been used to typeset books, used in academic studies, and is made available in major typesetting software such as CTAN and MiKTeX, making it accessible for academic and technical publishing.

== See also ==
- Neo-Grotesque
- Computer font
- Variable font
- Open-source Unicode typefaces
- List of typefaces
