= Ga Maamli font =

Typeface

The Ga Maamli font is a hand-drawn, all-caps digital format typeface that was created from an inspiration of art in Ga communities like Jamestown, Chorkor and Nungua. It was created by Afotey Clement Nii Odai, Ama Diaka, David Abbey-Thompson and released to Google Fonts and licensed under the SIL Open Font License.

== Background ==
The Ga Maamli font represents historic handwritten posters found in the vibrant coastal communities of Accra. These fonts were used to design poster announcements for parties, boxing matches and concerts.
