= National Fonts =

Freely-licensed Thai script fonts

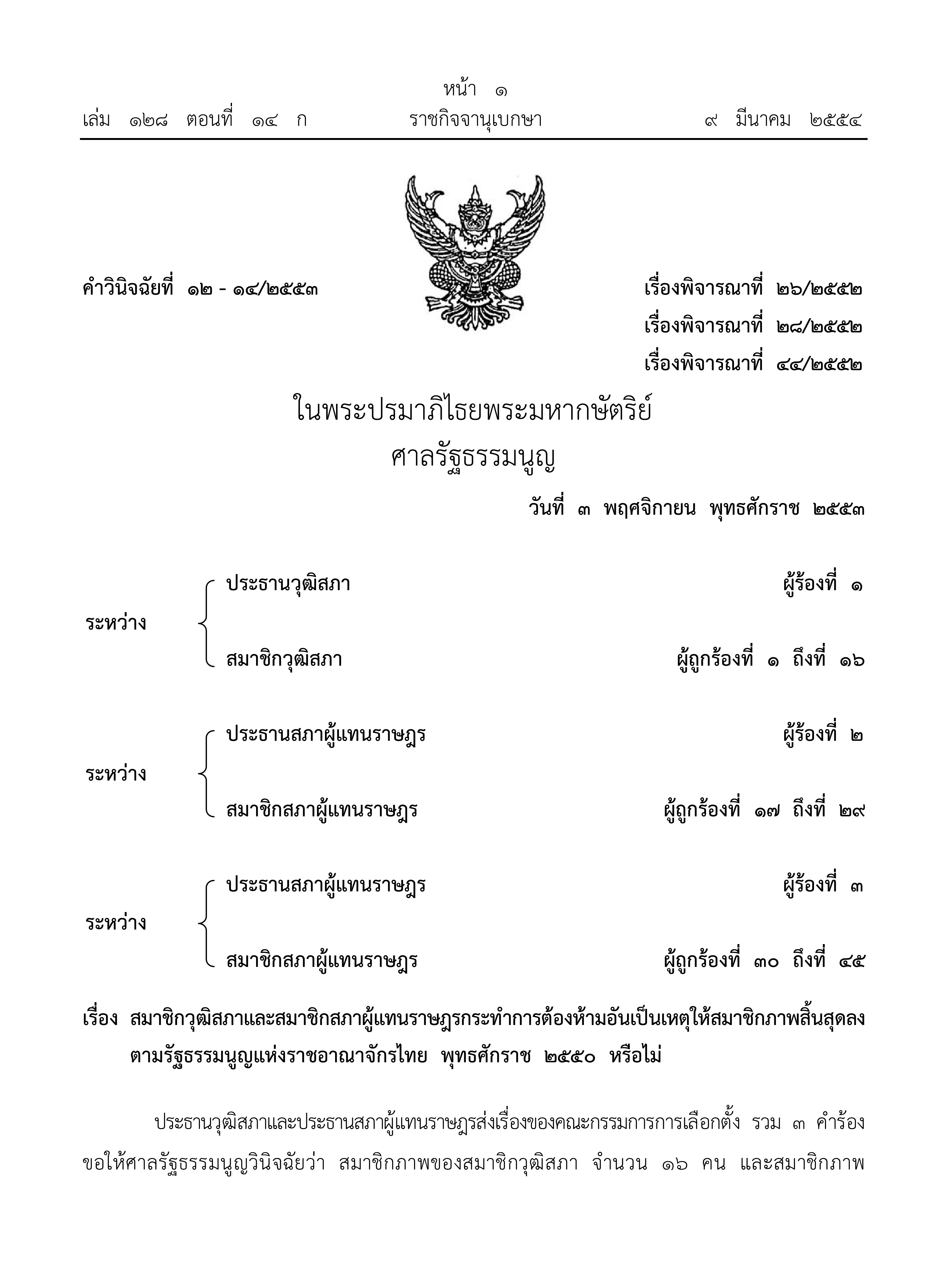
The 'Decision of the Constitutional Court No. 12-14/2553' which is published in the Government Gazette using the font "TH Sarabun PSK"

The National Fonts (Thai: ฟอนต์แห่งชาติ; RTGS: [font] haeng chat) are 2 sets of free and open-source computer fonts for the Thai script sponsored by the Thai government. In 2001, the first set of fonts was released by NECTEC. The 3 Thai typefaces in the set; Kinnari, Garuda and Norasi; were intended to be public alternatives to the widely used commercial typefaces. Later on, Thai Linux Working Group (TLWG) released these 3 typefaces alongside 10 others as Fonts-TLWG software package. In 2006, a computer font competition was held. 13 of these typefaces won the competition and later got adopted by the Government of Thailand as public and official fonts. Later in 2021, another typeface, Chulabhorn Likhit was selected as the 14th typeface in the set. Thus, the set has gained the nickname of fourteen National Fonts. The typefaces and all of their subsequently developed versions are released by the Software Industry Promotion Agency (SIPA), together with the Department of Intellectual Property through f0nt.com. Hence another nickname for the set, SIPA fonts (ฟอนต์ซิป้า). In 2018, 13 of these typefaces from this set have been revised by a local font foundry Cadson Demak (คัดสรร ดีมาก), along with Google Fonts.

== History ==
=== Typefaces by NECTEC and Thai Linux Working Group ===
In 2001, the first "National Fonts" set was released by NECTEC. It contains three Thai typefaces: Kinnari, Garuda, and Norasi. These typefaces were intended to be public alternatives to the widely used, yet licence-restricted, commercial typefaces that came bundled with major operating systems and applications. Later on, Thai Linux Working Group (TLWG) released these 3 typefaces alongside 10 others as Fonts-TLWG software package. Aside from Waree, the other 12 typefaces were released under GPL.

=== 2006 competition ===
On 2 August 2006, Abhisit Vejjajiva's Council of Ministers organised a competition to replace all existing fonts the Thai Government had bought from the private sector, including Microsoft's Angsana New, Browalia New, Cordia New, and EucrosiaUPC, which were extensively used at that time, with fonts created by Thai nationals. The competition was part of the "Standard Fonts for Thai Public Sectors" Project (โครงการฟอนต์มาตรฐานราชการไทย) proposed by the Ministry of Information and Communication Technology. The Ministry was quoted as saying: "...Various fonts are now used among the public agencies, that's why the state papers have never become standard. The fonts are also from the private companies which monopolise the rights over them, so we cannot use them as much as we should...".

On 7 September 2010, the Council of Ministers officially announced the thirteen fonts as the public fonts, naming them the "national fonts". The public agencies were ordered to use these fonts, especially TH Sarabun PSK, in their state papers. They were required to cease to use the private sector's fonts by 5 December 2010, King Bhumibol Adulyadej's 83rd birthday. The legislative branch and the judicial branch were also asked for cooperation.

=== Revision by Cadson Demak and Google Fonts ===
In 2018, Cadson Demak a local font foundry worked with Google Fonts to revise all existing 13 National Fonts, providing them with more hinting, a wider range of weights, and better Unicode support. There is also a new font "Thasadith" which was inspired by TH Srisakdi. All of those fonts were released under Open Font License. Cadson Demak expected that the release of these revised National Fonts to Google Fonts would result in higher adoption of Thai looped typefaces compared to Thai loopless typefaces.

=== Chulabhorn Likhit ===
On 6 July 2021, the Council of Ministers officially approved the royal font set "Chulabhorn Likhit", the 14th Thai government standard font set as proposed by the Chulabhorn Royal Academy. The font is named to celebrate Princess Chulabhorn on the occasion of her 64th birthday and her graduation from the Doctor of Philosophy program in the Visual Arts Department, Faculty of Painting, Sculpture and Graphic Arts at Silpakorn University.

== Adoption ==
=== Thai Wikipedia ===
The font "TH Sarabun PSK" is used on the Thai Wikipedia's current logo.

The font "TH Sarabun PSK" is used on the current logo of Thai Wikipedia. This logo was designed by Pratya Singto (ปรัชญา สิงห์โต), a graphic designer who runs f0nt.com, and was adopted by the Community as it won a competition in 2008.

=== Elsewhere ===
The font "TH Sarabun PSK" has been used in the Government Gazette of Thailand (Thai: ราชกิจจานุเบกษา; RTGS: Ratchakitchanubeksa) since January 2011, replacing Angsana New. The Gazette's first volume using such font is volume 128, part 1 A, dated 7 January 2011, in which the "Ministerial Regulation Determining the Criteria and Procedure for Acknowledging the Aircraft Type Certificates or Supplementary Type Certificates issues by the State Parties to the Conventions governing the Application for Certificates of Airworthiness or by the States with which Thailand has adopted the similar Agreements, BE 2553 (2010)" ("กฎกระทรวงกำหนดหลักเกณฑ์และวิธีการรับรองใบรับรองแบบอากาศยานหรือใบรับรองแบบส่วนเพิ่มเติมที่ออกโดยรัฐภาคีแห่งอนุสัญญาหรือประเทศที่ได้ทำความตกลงกับประเทศไทย เพื่อขอใบสำคัญสมควรเดินอากาศ พ.ศ. 2553") was published.

== List of typefaces ==
=== Fonts-TLWG ===
The following table list all 13 typefaces published by Thai Linux Working Group in the Fonts-TLWG software package; including Kinnari, Garuda and Norasi.

	Name	Etymology	Designers	External links
1.	Kinnari	A kinnari is a female counterpart of a kinnara, a creature from Hindu and Buddhist mythology.	Copyright (C) 1999 Db Type. All Rights Reserved. Copyright (C) 2007 National Electronics and Computer Technology Center.	Transitional serif Latin glyphs (based on Times New Roman) with looped Thai glyphs.
2.	Garuda	Garuda is a Hindu deity who is primarily depicted as the mount (vahana) of the Hindu god Vishnu.	Generated by NECTEC for Public Domain. Modified under GNU General Public License by TLWG.	Sans-serif Latin glyphs with looped Thai glyphs.
3.	Norasi		Copyright (C) 1999, The National Font Project (v.beta). Yannis Haralambous, Virach Sornlertlamvanich and Anutara Tantraporn. All rights reserved. Modified under GNU General Public License, with creators' permission, by Thai Linux Working Group (TLWG).	Transitional serif Latin glyphs (based on Times New Roman) with looped Thai glyphs.
4.	Loma	Loma (โลมา) means "dolphin".	Copyright (C) 2003, NECTEC. All rights reserved.	Sans-serif Latin glyphs with looped Thai glyphs.
5.	TlwgMono		Copyright (C) 2003 Poonlap Veerathanabutr	Monospace slab serif Latin glyphs (As it's based on Courier (typeface)) with looped Thai glyphs.
6.	Tlwg Typewriter		Copyright (C) 2003, 2004 Poonlap Veerathanabutr	Monospace slab serif Latin glyphs (As it's based on Courier (typeface)) with looped Thai glyphs.
7.	Tlwg Typist		based on Poonlap Veerathanabutr's Tlwg Typewriter. Copyright (C) 2005-2014 Theppitak Karoonboonyanan.	Monospace slab serif Latin glyphs (As it's based on Courier (typeface)) with looped Thai glyphs.
8.	Tlwg Typo		based on Poonlap Veerathanabutr's Tlwg Typewriter. Copyright (C) 2005-2014 Theppitak Karoonboonyanan.	Monospace slab serif Latin glyphs (As it's based on Courier (typeface)) with looped Thai glyphs.
9.	Purisa	Purisa means "a man".	Copyright (C) 2003, 2004 Poonlap Veerathanabutr, GPL license	Script sans-serif Latin glyphs with script looped Thai glyphs.
10.	Sawasdee	Sawasdee means "hello"	Copyright (C) 2007 Pol Udomwittayanukul.	Sans-serif Latin glyphs with loopless Thai glyphs.
11.	Umpush		Copyright (C) 2003 NECTEC. All rights reserved. Copyright (c) 2007 Widhaya Trisarnwadhana.	Sans-serif Latin glyphs with looped Thai glyphs.
12.	Laksaman	The name Laksaman is derived from Lakshmana.	Copyright (c) 2014 Theppitak Karoonboonyanan.	Sans-serif Latin glyphs with looped Thai glyphs. (Based on TH Sarabun New)
13.	Waree	The name Waree means "water", "river", "sea" and "ocean".	Copyright (C) 2003 by Bitstream, Inc. All Rights Reserved. TLWG changes are in public domain. Bitstream Vera is a trademark of Bitstream, Inc.	Sans-serif Latin glyphs (based on Bitstream Vera) with looped Thai glyphs.

=== Fourteen National Fonts ===
The following table list 13 National Fonts that won the competition in 2006 along with Chulabhorn Likhit.

#	Name	Samples	Etymology/Notes	Designers	External links
1.	TH Sarabun PSK		The name "Sarabun" (สารบรรณ, RTGS: Saraban) means documentary affairs.	Suppakit Chalermlarp (ศุภกิจ เฉลิมลาภ)	f0nt.com
1.	TH Sarabun New		"TH Sarabun New" is a new revision of "TH Sarabun PSK", initially released on August 19, 2011. The latest version of "TH Sarabun New" is the version 1.35 which fix issues with Microsoft Office for Mac, released on November 15, 2019.	Suppakit Chalermlarp (ศุภกิจ เฉลิมลาภ)	f0nt.com
2.	TH Charmonman		The name "Chamornman" (จามรมาน, RTGS: Chamon Man) means the heart of a rain tree, known in Thailand as the symbolic tree of Chulalongkorn University. However, the designer is an alumnus of Bangkok University, not Chulalongkorn.	Ekkalak Phianphanawet (เอกลักษณ์ เพียรพนาเวช)	f0nt.com
3.	TH Krub		The font is named after a Thai particle "Krub" (ครับ, RTGS: Khrap).	Ekkalak Phianphanawet	f0nt.com
4.	TH Srisakdi		The name "Srisakdi" (ศรีศักดิ์, RTGS: Si Sak) means prestige. The font is inspired by "court style", a style of writing prominent during the Thonburi Kingdom and the early Rattanakosin Kingdom. A font family on Google Fonts by Cadson Demak, Thasadith, is based on TH Srisakdi.	Aksaramethi Team (ทีมอักษราเมธี), consisting of Phairot Piamprachakphong (ไพโรจน์ เปี่ยมประจักพงษ์) Bowon Chonradon and (บวร จรดล)	f0nt.com
5.	TH Niramit AS		The name "Niramit" (นิรมิต) means being invented by magic.	Aksaramethi Team	f0nt.com
6.	TH Charm of AU		"AU" is the abbreviation for Assumption University.	Kanlayanamit Noraratphutthi (กัลยาณมิตร นรรัตน์พุทธิ)	f0nt.com
7.	TH Kodchasan		The name "Kodchasan" (คชสาร, RTGS: Khotchasan) means an elephant.	Kansuda Piamprachakphong (กัลย์สุดา เปี่ยมประจักพงษ์)	f0nt.com
8.	TH K2D July8		The name "July8" refers to the Buddhist observance marking the beginning of Vassa, also known as Buddhist Lent.	Kant Rodsawat (กานต์ รอดสวัสดิ์)	f0nt.com
9.	TH Mali Grade 6		It is the handwriting of a grade-6 girl named "Little Jasmine" or "Mali" (เด็กหญิงมะลิ), a character created by the designer.	Sudarat Leotsithong (สุดารัตน์ เลิศสีทอง)	f0nt.com
10.	TH Chakra Petch		The name "Chakra Petch" (จักรเพชร, RTGS: Chak Phet) means a crystal chakram. According to Google Font's metrics, Chakra Petch is the most popular looped Thai typeface.	Thirawat Photwibunsiri (ธีรวัฒน์ พจน์วิบูลศิริ)	f0nt.com
11.	TH Bai Jamjuree CP		The name "Bai Jamjuree" (ใบจามจุรี, RTGS: Bai Chamchuri) means 'the leaves of a rain tree'.	PITA Team, consisting of Rapee Suveeranont (รพี สุวีรานนท์) and Virot Chiraphadhanakul (วิโรจน์ จิรพัฒนกุล)	f0nt.com
12.	TH KoHo		"KoHo" refers to the first and last consonants of the Thai writing system, ko kai (ก ไก่) and ho nok-huk (ฮ นกฮูก).	Ko-Ho Group (กลุ่ม ก-ฮ), or A-Z Group, consisting of Kham Chaturongkhakun (ขาม จาตุรงคกุล), Kanokwan Phaenthaisong (กนกวรรณ แพนไธสง) and Khanittha Sitthiyaem (ขนิษฐา สิทธิแย้ม)	f0nt.com
13.	TH Fah Kwang		The name "Fah Kwang" (ฟ้ากว้าง, RTGS: Fa Kwang) means 'the sky is wide' or 'the wide sky'.	Team Eleven (ทีมสิบเอ็ด), consisting of Kitti Sirirattanabunchai (กิตติ ศิริรัตนบุญชัย) and Niwat Phattharowat (วัฒน์ ภัทโรวาสน์)	f0nt.com
14.	Chulabhorn Likhit		Named after Princess Chulabhorn.	Chulabhorn Royal Academy	f0nt.com cra.ac.th

=== Google Fonts ===
There are currently 1907 font families on Google Fonts. 34 of those support Thai script. The following table lists the first 32 fonts families with Thai script support that got added to Google Fonts.

Popularity ranking	Name	Etymology/Notes	Designers	External links
1.	Kanit	Loopless Thai/Sans serif	Cadson Demak	Google Fonts
2.	Prompt	Loopless Thai/Sans serif	Cadson Demak	Google Fonts
3.	Chakra Petch	Based on "TH Chakra Petch"	Cadson Demak	Google Fonts
4.	Sarabun	Based on "TH Sarabun New" (which is in turn based on "TH SarabunPSK")	Suppakit Chalermlarp (Note: Suppakit Chalermlarp is now working for Cadson Demak.)	Google Fonts
5.	Noto Sans Thai	Loopless Thai/Sans serif	Google (Noto fonts)	Google Fonts
6.	Mitr		Cadson Demak	Google Fonts
7.	Taviraj		Cadson Demak	Google Fonts
8.	Pridi		Cadson Demak	Google Fonts
9.	Sriracha		Cadson Demak	Google Fonts
10.	Bai Jamjuree	Based on "TH Bai Jamjuree CP"	Cadson Demak	Google Fonts
11.	Niramit	Based on "TH Niramit AS"	Cadson Demak	Google Fonts
12.	Krub	Based on "TH Krub"	Cadson Demak	Google Fonts
13.	Itim	Looped Thai/semiserif	Cadson Demak	Google Fonts
14.	Charm	Based on "TH Charm of AU"	Cadson Demak	Google Fonts
15.	Athiti		Cadson Demak	Google Fonts
16.	Anuphan		Cadson Demak	Google Fonts
17.	Mali	Based on "TH Mali Grade 6"	Cadson Demak	Google Fonts
18.	K2D	Based on "TH K2D July8"	Cadson Demak	Google Fonts
19.	Maitree		Cadson Demak	Google Fonts
20.	Pattaya		Cadson Demak	Google Fonts
21.	IBM Plex Sans Thai		Mike Abbink, Bold Monday (IBM Plex)	Google Fonts
22.	Chonburi		Cadson Demak	Google Fonts
23.	Trirong		Cadson Demak	Google Fonts
24.	Noto Serif Thai		Google (Noto fonts)	Google Fonts
25.	Fahkwang	Based on "TH Fah Kwang"	Cadson Demak	Google Fonts
26.	Thasadith	Indirectly based on "TH Srisakdi"	Cadson Demak	Google Fonts
27.	KoHo	Based on "TH KoHo"	Cadson Demak	Google Fonts
28.	Kodchasan	Based on "TH Kodchasan"	Cadson Demak	Google Fonts
29.	Charmonman	Based on "TH Charmonman"	Cadson Demak	Google Fonts
30.	Srisakdi	Based on "TH Srisakdi"	Cadson Demak	Google Fonts
31.	IBM Plex Sans Thai Looped		Mike Abbink, Bold Monday (IBM Plex)	Google Fonts
32.	Noto Sans Thai Looped		Google (Noto fonts)	Google Fonts

== See also ==
- Open-source Unicode typefaces
- Cantarell, the default typeface in past versions of GNOME
- Droid (typeface), the default fonts for first versions of Android
  - Noto fonts, the default fonts for newer versions of Android
  - Open Sans, another font based on Droid Sans
  - Roboto, the default fonts for newer versions of Android
- IBM Plex, free and open-source fonts from IBM
- PT Fonts, free and open-source fonts from Russia
- STIX Fonts project, typefaces intended to serve the scientific and engineering community
