= Cantarell =

Cantarell may refer to

- Cantarell (typeface), the default typeface used in the user interface of GNOME from version 3.0 to 47
- Cantarell Field (or Cantarell Complex), an aging supergiant oil field in Mexico
