= IBM Plex =

Open source typeface family

IBM Plex Sans
- Category: Sans-serif
- Classification: Grotesque
- Designers: Mike Abbink; Paul van der Laan; Pieter van Rosmalen
- Foundry: IBM; Bold Monday
- License: SIL OFL
- Latest release version: 3.5
- Latest release date: 20 September 2023; 2 years ago

IBM Plex Sans Condensed
- Category: Sans-serif
- Classification: Grotesque
- Designers: Mike Abbink; Paul van der Laan; Pieter van Rosmalen
- Foundry: IBM; Bold Monday
- License: SIL OFL
- Latest release version: 1.4
- Latest release date: 28 July 2022; 4 years ago

IBM Plex Mono
- Category: Monospaced
- Designers: Mike Abbink; Paul van der Laan; Pieter van Rosmalen
- Foundry: IBM; Bold Monday
- License: SIL OFL
- Latest release version: 2.4
- Latest release date: 21 December 2023; 2 years ago

IBM Plex Serif
- Category: Serif
- Classification: Transitional
- Designers: Mike Abbink; Paul van der Laan; Pieter van Rosmalen
- Foundry: IBM; Bold Monday
- License: SIL OFL
- Latest release version: 3.1
- Latest release date: 27 November 2023; 2 years ago

IBM Plex is an open source typeface superfamily conceptually designed and developed by Mike Abbink at IBM in collaboration with Bold Monday to reflect the design principles of IBM and to be used for all brand material across the company internationally. Plex replaces Helvetica as the IBM corporate typeface after more than fifty years in 2017, freeing the company from extensive license payments in the process.

Version 1.0 of the font family had four typefaces, each with eight weights (Thin, Extra Light, Light, Regular, Text, Medium, Semi-bold, Bold) and true italics to complement them.

- IBM Plex Sans – A grotesque sans-serif typeface with a design that was inspired by Franklin Gothic. Other sans-serif classifications were rejected on the basis of being too soft (humanist), inefficient (geometric) and overly perfected (neo-grotesque). Some of Franklin Gothic's features such as the angled terminals, a double-storey g and a horizontal line at the baseline of the 1 are used in IBM Plex Sans. On 7 April 2019, IBM Plex Sans Variable, a variable counterpart to IBM Plex Sans was released.
- IBM Plex Sans Condensed – A condensed variant of IBM Plex Sans.
- IBM Plex Mono – A monospaced typeface based on IBM Plex Sans. The italic design was inspired by the Italic 12 typeface used on the IBM Selectric typewriter; this is particularly evident with the italicised i, j, t and x letters.
- IBM Plex Serif – A transitional serif typeface with a design that was inspired by Bodoni and Janson. Other serif classifications were rejected for being too humanist and outdated (old-style) and too clunky and unrefined for long text (slab-serif). Some of Bodoni's features such as ball terminals and rectangular serifs are used in IBM Plex Serif.

== Unicode coverage ==
As of version 1.0 the IBM Plex typefaces support over 100 languages with most that use the Latin alphabet (including Vietnamese), as well as Cyrillic (except in IBM Plex Sans Condensed). In version 3.0 of IBM Plex Sans, support for monotonic Greek was added. For other writing systems separate fonts were made without italics:

- IBM Plex Sans Hebrew – Adding support for the Hebrew writing system.
- IBM Plex Sans Thai – Adding support for the informal loopless Thai script, released on 15 October 2018.
- IBM Plex Sans Thai Looped – Adding support for the formal looped Thai script, on 5 April 2019.
- IBM Plex Sans Devanagari – Added support for the Devanagari writing system, released on 14 December 2018.
- IBM Plex Sans Arabic – Added support for Arabic script, released on 13 March 2019.
- IBM Plex Sans Korean – Added support for the Hangul alphabet, released on 8 June 2020.
- IBM Plex Sans Japanese – Added support for Japanese writing system, released on 24 July 2021.

In addition, both Mike Abbink and Bold Monday have confirmed to be working on support for CJK, Bengali, Tamil and Kannada.

There is also support for common mathematical and currency symbols (including Bitcoin (₿) #U+20BF which was ratified into Unicode in 2017) as well as ligatures such as fi and fl, along with stylistic alternates for a, g and 0.

There are a few unreleased symbols for IBM Plex Sans Condensed, IBM Plex Mono and IBM Plex Serif such as the generic currency sign (¤), prime symbol (′) and double prime symbol (″). In addition Mike Abbink has confirmed support for the Mathematical Operators block and support for the symbols used in the APL programming language in 2019.

The FCC #EFCC and CE marking #ECE0 logos are encoded as glyphs within the Private Use Area. Prior to version 1.0, five IBM logos (solid and 8-bar logos, and the I-Bee-M logo) #EBE1 to #EBE7 were also encoded as glyphs.

== Licensing ==
IBM has licensed the font files only under the SIL Open Font License (SIL OFL). Between 9 August 2018 and 21 August 2018, the fonts were also dual-licensed under the Apache License. This dual-licensing arrangement was rescinded due to concerns that the Apache License is unsuitable for fonts. The SIL OFL license is free and open-source, but building the fonts from source requires FontLab Studio, which is proprietary software.

Bold Monday also provide web development code in CSS, SCSS and JavaScript that is related to the fonts under the Apache License. Font packages in npm are also available.

IBM Plex's name is reserved, as allowed by the SIL OFL, and trademarked as of December 2017.

== See also ==
- Carbon Design System - open source design system from IBM, uses IBM Plex as its default typeface
- Open-source Unicode typefaces
- Cantarell, the default typeface in past versions of GNOME
- Droid (typeface), the default fonts for first versions of Android
  - Noto fonts, the default fonts for newer versions of Android
  - Open Sans, another font based on Droid Sans
  - Roboto, the default fonts for newer versions of Android
- National Fonts, free and open-source Thai fonts
- PT Fonts, free and open-source fonts from Russia
- STIX Fonts project, typefaces intended to serve the scientific and engineering community
