= STIX Fonts project =

Mathematical OpenType typeface

STIX
- Category: Various
- Classification: Transitional
- Commissioned by: STIX Pub
- Foundry: MicroPress and others
- Date created: 2008; 18 years ago
- Website: stixfonts.org
- Latest release version: 1.1.3
- Latest release date: 17 April 2018; 8 years ago

ESSTIX
- Category: Various
- Classification: Transitional
- Commissioned by: Elsevier
- Foundry: Elsevier
- Date created: 2000; 26 years ago

The STIX Fonts project, or Scientific and Technical Information Exchange (STIX), is a project sponsored by several leading scientific and technical publishers to provide, under open-source license, a comprehensive font set of mathematical symbols and alphabets, intended to serve the scientific and engineering community for electronic and print publication. The STIX fonts are available as fully hinted OpenType/CFF fonts. The project was initiated in 1995 and officially released its first stable version (STIX 1.0) in May 2010, after 15 years of development, with subsequent updates including STIX Two released in 2016. There is currently no TrueType version of the STIX fonts available, but the STIX Mission Statement includes the intention to create one in the future. However, there exists an unofficial conversion of STIX Fonts (from the beta version release) to TrueType, suitable for use with software without OpenType support.

STIX fonts also include natural language glyphs for Latin, Greek and Cyrillic. The family is designed to be visually compatible with the Times New Roman family, a popular choice in book publishing.

== Composition ==
Among the glyphs in STIX, 32.9% have been contributed by the project members. The commercial TeX vendor and TeX font foundry MicroPress has been contracted to create the additional glyphs. The STIX project will also create a TeX implementation. Goals also include incorporating the characters into Unicode, and ensuring that browsers can use them.

Members of the STIX Fonts project, known collectively as the STI Pub consortium, include the American Institute of Physics, the American Chemical Society, the American Mathematical Society, the Institute of Electrical and Electronics Engineers, the American Physical Society, and Elsevier.

The Font contents were assembled from a list of every character/glyph required for publication in the journals of the participating STI Pub companies. Every scientific discipline is represented in this list, as well as many other fields from the arts and humanities. Most of the glyphs in the STIX Fonts have been designed in Times-compatible style. In addition to Times-compatible glyphs, some portions of the STIX Fonts include other design styles such as sans serif, monospace, Fraktur, Script, and calligraphic.

— STIX Fonts website

== Development process ==
A beta version of the fonts was released on October 31, 2007. This version does not include enough of the OpenType mathematical layout features present in Cambria Math, so it is not usable to the fullest extent in Microsoft Office 2007. The Latin glyph set included in the beta version does not yet cover all the characters required to typeset in Eastern European languages.

"Final design changes" were declared "complete" at the project website on June 9, 2008. A release by end of May 2009 for the "initial production release" was announced, still without the support for OpenType layout features of Office 2007 or TeX. In September 2009, the fonts went to the final packaging stage. However, in October, missing glyphs were discovered, adding a delay. The fonts were scheduled to be released in April 2010, and released on May 28, 2010.

The project has taken considerably longer than forecast. The website has been updated only intermittently, and thus has regularly been out-of-date, with forecast milestones often being overshot. For example, on 20 July 2011 the main page on the official site stated, "Version 1.1, which will include fonts packaged for use with Microsoft Office applications, is scheduled for release by the end of 2010. [...] This site was last updated on 1 November [2010]." Version 1.1.0 was released February 24, 2012. This version facilitates equation editing in recent versions of Microsoft Word. Version 1.1.0 with LaTeX support was released on May 29, 2013.

== STIX 2.0.0 ==
STIX Two compared to the standard digitisation of Times New Roman. STIX Two has a higher x-height and a reduction in fine detail.

On December 1, 2016, the official project website announced the release of STIX version 2.0.0. This was created by Ross Mills and John Hudson of Tiro Typeworks. Unlike the previous version, which closely matches Nimbus Roman No. 9 L, it is an original design loosely inspired by a smaller 10 point size of Times New Roman, with a higher x-height.

In April 2018, the Type 1 version of the STIX Two fonts for use in LaTeX was released. At the same time, the STIX project hosting platform has been migrated to GitHub (https://github.com/stipub/stixfonts/).

== Uptake ==
The STIX Fonts are included in OS X in versions from Lion (10.7) onwards.

The JavaScript framework MathJax uses the STIX fonts for including mathematics in web pages. Installing the fonts on the local computer improves MathJax's typesetting speed.

The Math Editor equation editor uses STIX fonts as its primary font.

== ESSTIX ==
A precursor to the STIX project is the ESSTIX (Elsevier Science STIX) font, developed and later donated by Elsevier. It is currently available from the World Wide Web Consortium as part of the Amaya (web browser). However, the STIX fonts are not used in most of the peer-reviewed journals published by Elsevier.

== See also ==
- Open-source Unicode typefaces
- Cantarell, the default typeface in past versions of GNOME
- Droid (typeface), the default fonts for first versions of Android
  - Noto fonts, the default fonts for newer versions of Android
  - Open Sans, another font based on Droid Sans
  - Roboto, the default fonts for newer versions of Android
- IBM Plex, free and open-source fonts from IBM
- National Fonts, free and open-source Thai fonts
- PT Fonts, free and open-source fonts from Russia
