= Google Fonts =

Web font library

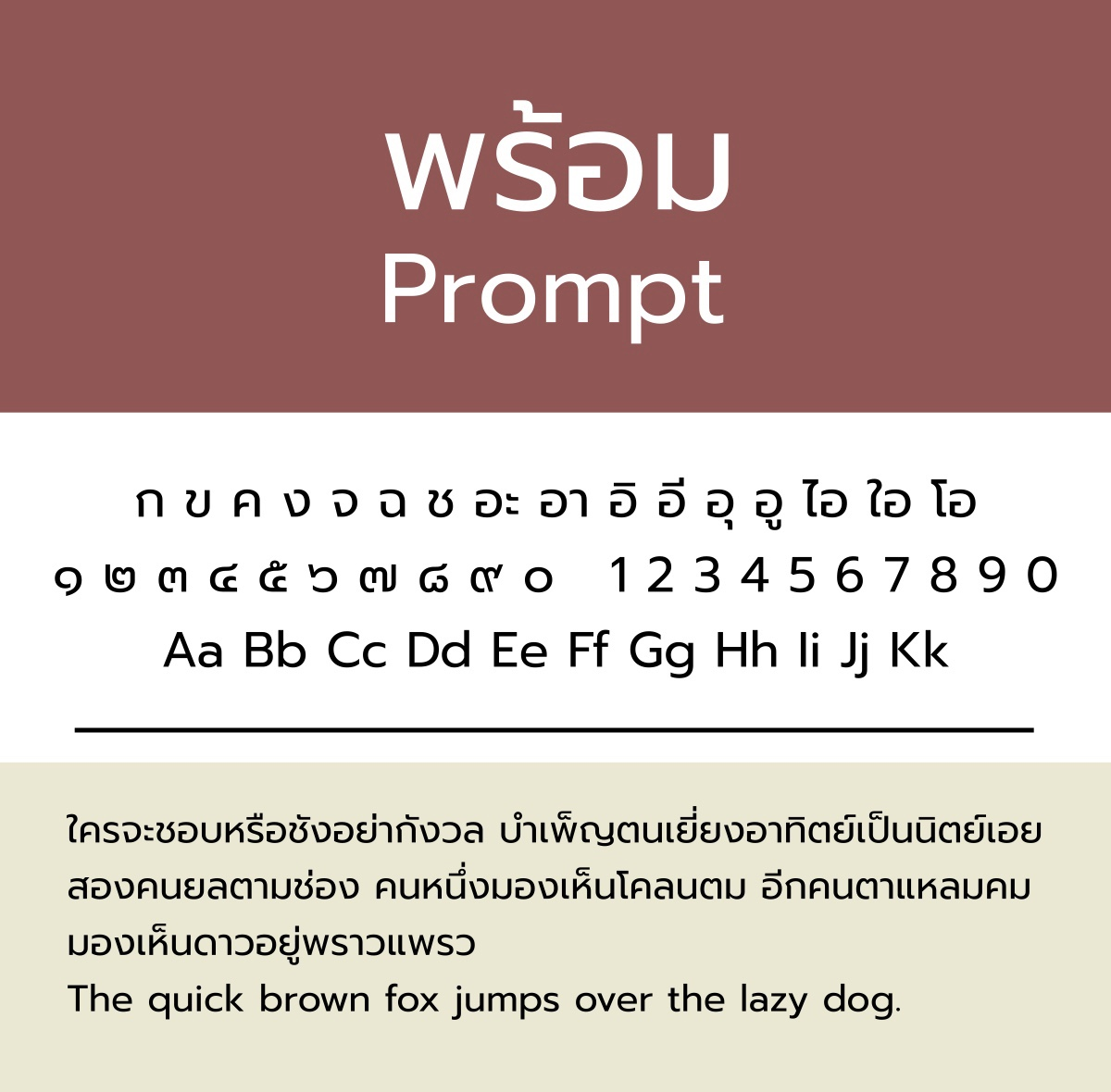
- Prompt, a Thai typeface from Google Fonts
- Developer: Google
- Type: Font embedding service
- Launched: 2010
- Website: fonts.google.com

Google Fonts (formerly known as Google Web Fonts) is a computer font and web font service owned by Google. This includes free and open source font families, an interactive web directory for browsing the library, and APIs for using the fonts via CSS and Android. Google Fonts is also used with Google Workspace software such as Docs, Sheets, Drawings and Slides.

Popular fonts in the Google Fonts library include Roboto, Open Sans, Lato, Oswald and Montserrat. National Fonts and PT Fonts are also available in the Google Fonts library.

== History ==
Google Fonts was launched in 2010 and revamped in 2011, 2016, 2020 and 2023.

On March 3, 2020, Google updated the catalog website with support for variable fonts. On March 2, 2021, the Google Fonts team announced they were adding support for open source icons.

== Font library ==
As of November 2026, Google Fonts had 1959 font families, including 565 variable font families.

The library is maintained through Google Fonts' GitHub repository, where all font files can be obtained directly. Source files for many of the fonts are available from git repositories within the Google Fonts' GitHub organization, along with libre software tools used by the Google Fonts community.

=== Licenses and distribution ===
Most of the fonts are released under the SIL Open Font License 1.1, while some are released under the Apache License; both are libre licenses.

The font library is also distributed by Monotype's SkyFonts and Adobe's Edge Web Fonts and Adobe Fonts (formerly Typekit) services.

== Privacy issues ==
In February 2022, a German court ruled that a website using the Google Fonts API violated the European Union General Data Protection Regulation (GDPR) by passing personally identifiable information (IP address) to Google without the user's consent or a legitimate interest in doing so. Website operators can avoid this privacy violation by self-hosting the fonts instead.
