= Cantarell (typeface) =

Humanist sans-serif typeface

- Category: Sans-serif
- Classification: Humanist
- Designer: Dave Crossland
- Foundry: Abattis
- Date created: 2009
- License: SIL Open Font License
- Website: cantarell.gnome.org
- Latest release version: 0.303
- Latest release date: 13 September 2021

Cantarell is a humanist typeface used as the default user interface typeface of GNOME from version 3.0 until version 48, replacing Bitstream Vera and DejaVu. The font was originated by Dave Crossland in 2009.

Operating systems that shipped GNOME (version 3 to version 48) included this typeface family by default, such as Fedora Linux, and Red Hat Enterprise Linux includes the font family in its Google Fonts directory, making the typeface available for use in Web sites. It is notably absent in Ubuntu which includes the Ubuntu typeface instead.

In GNOME 48, Cantarell was replaced with Adwaita Sans as the default typeface for the user interface. Adwaita Sans is a customized version of Inter, which was initially intended to replace Cantarell starting from GNOME 47.

== History ==
In 2009 the Cantarell fonts were initially designed by Dave Crossland during his studies of typeface design at the University of Reading. In 2010, the fonts were chosen by GNOME for use in its 3.0 release, and the font sources were moved to GNOME's Git repository. The fonts are maintained there, allowing contributions from a variety of designers including Jakub Steiner and Pooja Saxena. In 2013 Pooja Saxena joined the GNOME foundation's "Outreach Programme for Women" internship, and was tasked with improving the design and language support. In 2014 Pooja was given financial support by Google Fonts to extend the design to Devanagari, but due to unavoidable vertical metrics adjustments the family was published with a new name, Cambay. Another Cantarell-derived font is Petra Sans.

In GNOME 3.28 (March 2018), the font was re-designed with two additional weights, light and extra bold.

== Criticism ==
Cantarell initially received both criticism and support from the free software community. It was argued that GNOME's use of Cantarell reduced legibility in desktop applications, it was not kerned and has deformed glyphs. Other users enjoyed the design, calling it “stylish and beautiful, but most importantly, crisp and easy to read.” The initial release notes stated that it was designed for legibility on screens.

GNOME's choice was also criticized since Cantarell only supports some Latin languages, far fewer than the previously used DejaVu fonts. When the fonts were first published, Crossland invited others to extend the language support and this finally began in 2013 when Saxena began applying the design to the Cyrillic script.

Cantarell does not include native italics or oblique glyphs.

== See also ==
- Adwaita (design language) – design language of GNOME, which used Cantarell as its default typeface
- Open-source Unicode typefaces
- Droid (typeface), the default fonts for first versions of Android
  - Noto fonts, the default fonts for newer versions of Android
  - Open Sans, another font based on Droid Sans
  - Roboto, the default fonts for newer versions of Android
- IBM Plex, free and open-source fonts from IBM
- National Fonts, free and open-source Thai fonts
- PT Fonts, free and open-source fonts from Russia
- STIX Fonts project, typefaces intended to serve the scientific and engineering community
