= Carbon Design System =

Open-source design system developed by IBM

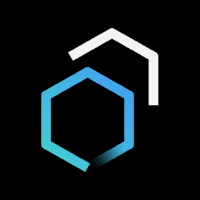
- Original author: IBM
- Developer: IBM

Stable release(s) [±]
- Carbon: 10.31.0 / April 1, 2021; 5 years ago
- Angular: 4.46.0 / March 24, 2021; 5 years ago
- React: 7.32.0 / April 1, 2021; 5 years ago
- Vue: 2.37.1 / February 2, 2021; 5 years ago
- Web Components: 1.12.0 / March 10, 2021; 5 years ago

Preview release(s) [±]
- React: 7.32.0-rc.0 / March 30, 2021; 5 years ago
- Svelte: 0.32.1 / April 2, 2021; 5 years ago
- Written in: JavaScript, Vue
- Type: Design language software
- License: Apache License 2.0
- Website: www.carbondesignsystem.com
- Repository: Carbon, React: carbon; Angular: carbon-components-angular; Svelte: carbon-components-svelte; Vue: carbon-components-vue; Web Components: carbon-web-components

Carbon Design System is a free and open-source design system and library created by IBM, which implements the IBM Design Language, and licensed under Apache License 2.0. Its public development initially started on June 10, 2015. Their components have multiple implementations, which includes a vanilla JS and CSS implementation and React (maintained by the Carbon Core team), while the community maintains the frameworks developed in Svelte, Vue.js, and Web Components. The official typeface to be used according to the guidelines is the IBM Plex typeface, with alternative typefaces for CJK scripts are Noto Sans CJK SC, Noto Sans CJK TC, and Noto Sans JP.

== See also ==
- Design language
- Flat design
- Fluent Design System by Microsoft
- Material Design by Google
