= Open Sans =

Humanist sans-serif typeface

- Category: Sans-serif
- Classification: Humanist
- Designer: Steve Matteson
- Foundry: Ascender Corporation
- Date created: 2010
- Date released: 2011
- License: SIL Open Font License, Apache License 2.0 (before March 2021)
- Design based on: Droid Sans
- Website: fonts.google.com/specimen/Open+Sans

Open Sans is an open source humanist sans-serif typeface that was designed by Steve Matteson under commission from Google. It was released in 2011 and is based on his earlier design called Droid Sans, which was specifically created for Android mobile devices but with slight modifications to its width.

The typeface is characterized by its wide apertures on many letters and a large x-height, making it highly legible on screens and at small sizes. Being part of the humanist genre of sans-serif typefaces, it also features a true italic style. As of July 2018, Open Sans is the second most widely used font on Google Fonts, serving over four billion views per day across more than 20 million websites.

In March 2021, the Open Sans font family was updated to include a variable font version, which now also supports Hebrew characters.

== Use ==
Open Sans is popular in flat design-style web design.

Open Sans is used in some of Google's web pages as well as its print and web advertisements. It is the official font of the UK's Labour, Co-operative, and Liberal Democrat parties.

Used in WordPress 3.8 which was released on December 12, 2013.

== Development ==
According to Google, it was developed with an "upright stress, open forms and a neutral, yet friendly appearance" and is "optimized for legibility across print, web, and mobile interfaces." Its design is similar to that of Matteson's Droid Sans, created as the first user interface font for Android phones, but with wider characters and the inclusion of italic variants. Explaining the different name, Matteson has said "Droid was intentionally narrow for mobile screens but it didn't have 'narrow' in the name. Open Sans isn't really 'extended' so that wasn't really an option either. A new family name is the direction they chose."

== Unicode support ==
The character repertoire contains 897 glyphs, covering the Latin, Greek and Cyrillic alphabets with a wide range of diacritics.

In January 2014, Israeli type designer Yanek Iontef released an extension font covering the Hebrew alphabet with support for niqqud (but not cantillation marks) for early access. The extension font went on to become popular and to be used by prominent institutions such as Tel Aviv University in its 2016 rebranding, and by the Haaretz website. Hebrew support was added in March 2021.

== Derivatives ==
Open Sans has six weights (Light 300, Normal 400, Medium 500, Semi-Bold 600, Bold 700 and Extra Bold 800), each of them with an italic version, totaling 12 versions, although the Medium and Medium Italic styles are not yet accepted into Adobe Fonts. It has a number of stylistic alternates, such as a capital 'i' with a serif (for situations where this could be confused with a number '1' or lower-case 'L') and a selectable choice between a single and double-storey 'g'. Numbers can be set as tabular or proportional lining figures or as proportional text figures.

=== Open Sans Condensed ===
Open Sans Condensed has three styles: light, bold and light italic. As of 2021, the "Regular", "Semibold", and "Extra Bold" versions have been released to GitHub, but not yet accepted into Google Fonts or Adobe Fonts.

=== Open Serif ===
Matteson designed Open Serif, a companion slab serif typeface family. While Open Serif is not open-source, the font is sold by Matteson Typographics, owned by Steve Matteson and released on August 26, 2016.

=== Open Sans Soft ===
On March 23, 2021, Matteson released a rounded version of Open Sans called Open Sans Soft. Like Open Serif, it is not an open-source font and is sold by Matteson Typographics. In contrast to the original open-source Open Sans, the capital 'i' with a serif is the default glyph for that letter, with the glyph without a serif as a stylistic alternate for it.

== See also ==
- Open-source Unicode typefaces
- Cantarell, the default typeface in past versions of GNOME
- Droid (typeface), the default fonts for first versions of Android
  - Noto fonts, the default fonts for newer versions of Android
  - Roboto, the default fonts for newer versions of Android
- IBM Plex, free and open-source fonts from IBM
- National Fonts, free and open-source Thai fonts
- PT Fonts, free and open-source fonts from Russia
- STIX Fonts project, typefaces intended to serve the scientific and engineering community
