= Droid (typeface) =

Typeface family

Droid Serif
- Category: Sans-serif, Serif, Monospace
- Designer: Steve Matteson
- Foundry: Ascender Corporation
- Date released: 2008; 17 years ago
- License: Apache License
- Sample

Droid is a font family first released in 2007 and created by Ascender Corporation for use by the Open Handset Alliance platform Android (also its namesake) and licensed under the Apache License. The fonts are intended for use on the small screens of mobile handsets and were designed by Steve Matteson of Ascender Corporation.

== Examples ==
Droid Serif

Droid Sans*

Droid Sans Mono

* Unlike other sans fonts, the capital letter I retains its serifs, which is also present in Noto Sans.

== Typefaces ==
The Droid font family consists of Droid Sans, Droid Sans Mono and Droid Serif:

- The Droid Sans typeface features Regular and Bold weights. The regular weight includes support for simplified and traditional Chinese, Japanese, Korean, Arabic, Armenian, Ethiopic, Georgian, Hebrew, and Thai support for the GB2312, Big 5, JIS X0208 and KSC 5601 character sets respectively which the design style for all the Ideographs are using the Simplified Chinese writing style. There is no italic variant of Droid Sans; italics would be synthesized by Android by generating an oblique form in order to save storage space. However, it is present in the fonts Open Sans and Noto Sans. Known variations include:

- Droid Sans Arabic [Regular] available from Google Fonts API
- Droid Sans Armenian [Bold and Regular] available from Google Fonts API
- Droid Sans Devanagari [Regular] available from Google Fonts API
- Droid Sans Georgian [Regular] available from Google Fonts API
- Droid Sans Hangul [Regular] available from Google Code
- Droid Sans Hebrew [Bold and Regular] available from Google Fonts API
- Droid Sans Japanese [Regular] available from Google Fonts API or Github
- Droid Sans SEMC [Regular] available from Nokia Website
- Droid Sans SEMC CJK [Regular] available from HTC website
- Droid Sans Subset [Bold and Regular] embedded font in Google Docs
- Droid Sans Tamil [Bold and Regular] available from Google Fonts API
- Droid Sans Thai [Regular] available from Google Fonts API

- Droid Sans Fallback font could be found on other language rich websites, especially those with Hindi or Khmer language support, are listed below:

- Droid Sans Fallback Full [Regular] available from Google Fonts API
- Droid Sans Fallback Fan Dal [Regular] available from Google Code China
- Droid Sans Fallback HTC [Regular] available from HTC website
- Droid Sans Fallback Indic [Regular] font support for Hindi, Devanagari, Kannada, Bengali, Oriya, Malayalam, Telugu, Tamil and Punjabi languages
- Droid Sans Fallback Khmer [Regular] font support for the Khmer language
- Droid Sans Fallback Legacy [Regular] available from Google Fonts API
- Droid Sans Fallback QVGA [Regular] font support for old VGA based systems

- Designed by Steve Matteson and Terrance Weinzierl of Monotype Imaging, Droid Sans Mono consists of only the Regular font. The design is similar to Matteson's closed source Andalé Mono typeface design. Taking advantage of the license under which the original typefaces were released, modifications of this Droid Sans Mono have appeared on the internet. Of particular note are those modifications that replace the plain zero glyph with dotted or slashed versions. Such modifications are particularly desired by users making heavy use of monospaced typefaces, including software developers, because they provide a more prominent differentiation between the two characters. They include:

- Droid Sans Mono Dotted [with dotted zeros]
- Droid Sans Mono Slashed [with slashed zeros]
- Droid Sans Mono Py [adapted for the Python programming language, with adjacent underscores separated]

- The Droid Serif typeface consists of Regular, Bold, Italic, and Bold Italic styles. Other variations of the Droid Serif font includes:

- Droid Serif Subset [Regular] embedded font in Google Docs
- Droid Serif Thai [Bold and Regular] available from Google Fonts API

Each typeface has an extensive character set including coverage of Western European, Eastern/Central European, Baltic, Cyrillic, Greek and Turkish languages.

=== Replacement of Droid Sans with Roboto ===
Droid Sans was designed for the low-resolution displays of the very early Android devices and did not display well in larger, higher-resolution displays of later models. With the release of Android 4.0 "Ice Cream Sandwich" in 2011, Droid Sans was replaced with Roboto as the default typeface.

== Droid Pro (2009) ==
On 12 February 2009, Ascender Corporation announced the retail version of the Droid fonts under the Droid Pro family. The fonts were sold in OpenType and TrueType font format. The Droid Pro family consists of Droid Sans Pro (Regular, Bold), Droid Sans Pro Condensed (Regular, Bold), Droid Sans Pro Mono (Regular, Bold), Droid Serif Pro (Regular, Italic, Bold, Bold Italic), Droid Sans Fallback. Initial releases include Droid Sans Pro, Droid Serif Pro. OpenType features include Old Style Figures, as well as dotted and plain variants of the zero glyph for Droid Sans Pro Mono (the default zero is slashed). Droid Sans Pro Mono went on sale on 31 July 2009.

=== Handset Condensed (2010) ===
Handset Condensed is a condensed version of Droid Sans Pro designed by Ascender Corp's Steve Matteson and released on 1 March 2013 to be compatible with the Droid family of fonts, but without OpenType features. Similar to Droid Sans Pro, the family includes two fonts in Bold and Regular weights without italics. It supports the WGL character set.

== Droid Arabic Kufi and Droid Arabic Naskh ==
In 2009, Ascender Corporation designed specially customed fonts for Google Fonts API as language support for the Arabic and Persian languages. The fonts that were released are available at the Google Fonts website and are Droid Arabic Naskh [both Bold and Regular weights] and Droid Arabic Kufi [both Bold and Regular weights]. Other variations that were found until recently includes the Droid Persian Naskh, a specific font for the Persian Farsi language distributed by Open Font Library in May 2014.

== Special Droid typefaces in Android phones ==
In some Android smartphones that uses Android 4.2 Jellybean, the following fonts have been found in the phone's "/system/fonts" folder. The fonts include:

- Droid Naskh Shift Alt [a font found only in Android phones supporting the Arabic, Urdu, Uighur and Farsi languages]
- Droid Naskh Shift [a font found only in Android phones supporting the Arabic, Urdu, Uighur and Farsi language calligraphies]
- Droid Naskh System UI [a system font found only in Android phones supporting the Arabic and Farsi languages]
- Droid Naskh UI [a system font found only in Android phones supporting the Arabic and Farsi language calligraphies]

Other variations of the Droid font that aimed to depict the Android 'robot' image logo include [Droid Robot Regular font] and [Droid Robot Japanese Regular font – for Japanese language support]. Aims by specific language font designers to adapt fonts for particular Southern Asian languages include Droid Hindi [support for the Hindi language], Droid Telugu [support for the Telugu language] and Droid India [support for the Indian languages all over India]. These fonts could be found on GitHub or in the XDA Developers forum for Android smartphones.

== See also ==
- Open-source Unicode typefaces
- Cantarell, the default typeface in past versions of GNOME
- Noto fonts, the default fonts for newer versions of Android
- Open Sans, another font based on Droid Sans
- Roboto, the default fonts for newer versions of Android
- IBM Plex, free and open-source fonts from IBM
- National Fonts, free and open-source Thai fonts
- PT Fonts, free and open-source fonts from Russia
- STIX Fonts project, typefaces intended to serve the scientific and engineering community
