= Noto fonts =

Multilingual font family from Google

Noto
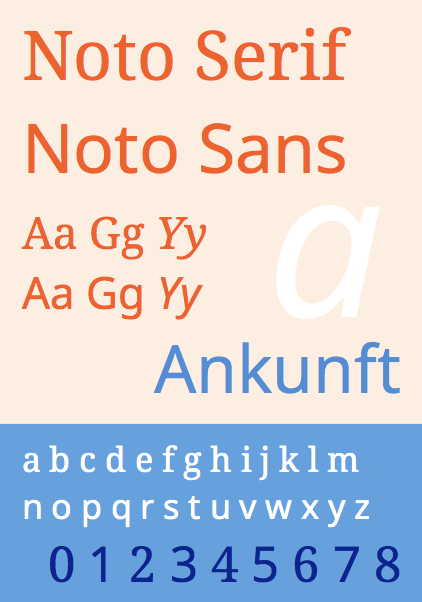
- Category: Sans-serif; serif; non-Latin
- Classification: Humanist (sans-serif); transitional (serif); non-Latin
- Designers: Steve Matteson, Jelle Bosma (Indic scripts), Patrick Giasson (Nastaliq)
- Commissioned by: Google
- Date created: 2012–2020
- Date released: 2013
- License: SIL Open Font License (2015–present); Apache License (2013–2015)
- Website: notofonts.github.io

Noto is a free font family comprising over 100 individual computer fonts, designed to cover all scripts encoded in the Unicode standard. As of November 2024, Noto covers around 1,000 languages and 162 writing systems. As of October 2016, Noto fonts cover all 93 scripts defined in Unicode version 6.1 (April 2012), although fewer than 30,000 of the nearly 75,000 CJK unified ideographs in version 6.0 are covered. In total, Noto fonts cover over 77,000 characters, about half of the 172,808 characters defined in Unicode 18.0 (released in September 2026).

The Noto family is designed with the goal of achieving visual harmony (e.g., compatible heights and stroke thicknesses) across multiple languages/scripts. Commissioned by Google, the font is licensed under the SIL Open Font License. Until September 2015, the fonts were under the Apache License 2.0.

== Etymology ==
When text is rendered by a computer, sometimes characters are displayed as substitute glyphs (typically small rectangles akin to ▯). They represent the characters that cannot be displayed because no font with the necessary characters is installed on the computer, and have sometimes been called by the slang name tofu because of their visual similarity to the food of the same name.

Google's aim for Noto (whose name is derived from no tofu) is to remove this kind of 'tofu' from the Web.

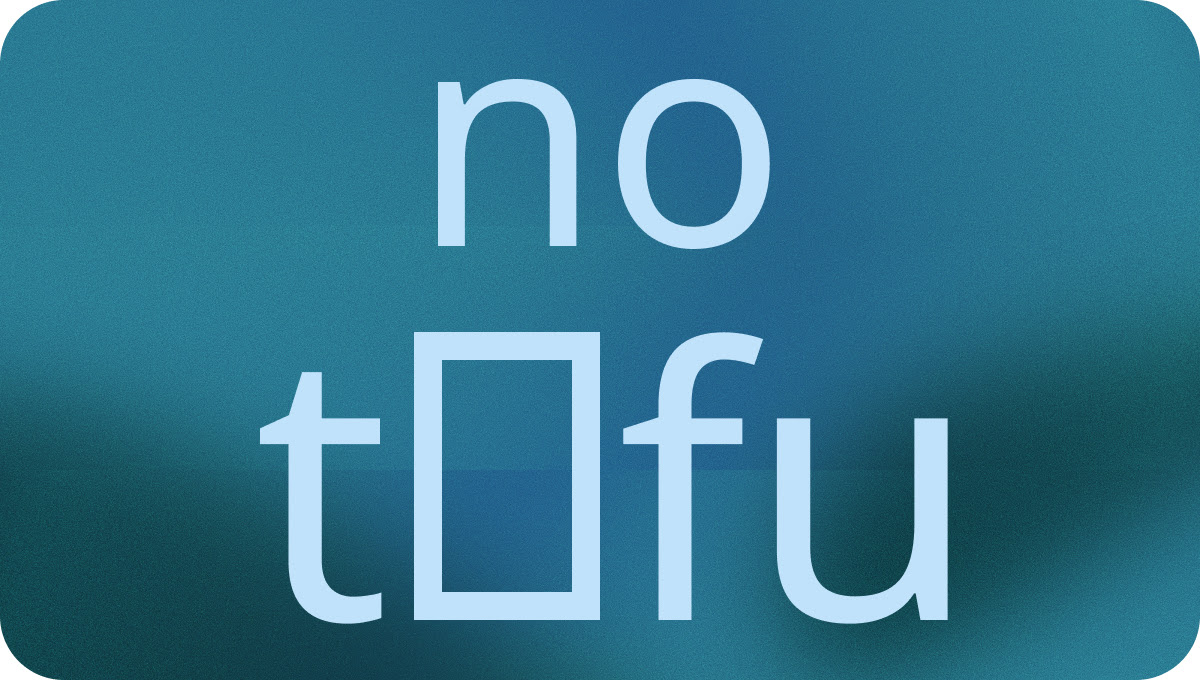
"no tofu" stylized as "no t▯fu"

Noto is also derived from the Latin word noto, meaning 'I write, I mark, I note', signifying Noto's goal of the ability to write in every language.

== Characteristics ==
=== Emoji ===
Color emoji from Noto Emoji Project

The Noto Emoji Project provides color and black-and-white emoji fonts. The color version is used on the Gmail, Google Chat, Google Meet, Google Voice, and YouTube web apps, as well as the Android, Wear OS, and ChromeOS operating systems. It is also used on the Slack apps on Windows, Linux, and Android.

In 2026, Google updated its Noto Emoji library to a new 3D style.

=== Latin, Greek and Cyrillic ===
Noto Sans and Noto Serif contain Latin, Greek and Cyrillic glyphs. Noto Sans is based on Droid Sans and Open Sans, while Noto Serif is based on Droid Serif. They are designed by Steve Matteson.

=== CJK ===
Source Han Sans, the Adobe/Google collaboration rebranded as Noto Sans CJK for East Asian scripts

Noto CJK fonts are also known as Adobe Source Han fonts, developed together by Adobe and Google which contains Chinese characters, hangul and kana; Latin-script letters and numerals are taken from the Source Pro fonts.

In addition to the standard distributions, Ken Lunde of Adobe maintains a "Super" OpenType Collection (OTC) version that provides the families under two names at once. Since OTCs reuse existing glyphs, such a file containing both Noto and Source fonts is only about 200 kB larger than one containing only Source fonts.

== Coverage ==
As of 29 December 2020 there are 195 Noto fonts, of which 156 are sans-serif style, 29 are serif style, and the remaining 10 fonts are not classified as serif or sans-serif. Noto Color Emoji provides multi-color emoji symbols up to Unicode 16.0 in the OpenType CBDT format. It works in Android, Google Chrome, Linux, Microsoft Windows 10 from 1607 including Cygwin, and in apps that support the OpenType CBDT format.

The Noto fonts cover 162 out of the 168 scripts defined in Unicode version 16.0 (released in September 2024), as well as various symbols and emoji which do not belong to a specific script.

As of October 2016, all scripts encoded up to Unicode version 6.0 (released October 2010) were covered by Noto fonts, although not all characters defined in Unicode version 6.0 were covered. In particular, only about 30,000 of the 74,616 CJK unified ideographs defined in Unicode version 6.0 were covered by Noto fonts. None of the 53 scripts and 1 block encoded between Unicode versions 6.1 and 11.0 were covered by Noto fonts, although some symbols, emoji, and characters added to existing scripts after version 6.0 were covered. It is a design goal for 'Phase 3' to cover all characters in Unicode version 9.0 except for most of CJK unified ideographs outside the Basic Multilingual Plane.

The Noto Sans Symbols fonts include a large variety of symbols, including alchemical signs, dingbats, numbers and letters enclosed in circles for lists, playing cards, domino and Mahjong tiles, chess piece icons, Greek, Byzantine and regular musical symbols and arrow symbols. Among mathematical symbols, it includes blackboard bold glyphs, a mathematical sans-serif font modeled on Helvetica, Fraktur and script fonts, hexagrams, and Aegean numerals.

As of April 2021, the Noto fonts in the GitHub repository have this coverage of Unicode 13:

Unicode coverage of Google Noto fonts (April 2021)
	Noto	Unicode	% of Unicode
Non-CJK	46794	49256	95.0%
CJK	30867	94442	32.7%
All Unicode	77661	143698	54.0%

== List of Noto fonts ==
As October 2026, the following fonts exist:

Font face	Version	Styles	Characters with distinct glyph	Glyphs	Notes
Noto Sans	2.015	Variable (Thin-Black; Extra-condensed-Regular), Italic Variable (Thin-Black; Extra-condensed-Regular)	3094 (Variable) 3093 (Variable Italic)	4669 (Variable) 4676 (Variable Italic)	For Latin, Cyrillic and Greek
Noto Sans Display	2.003	Variable (Thin-Black; Extra-condensed-Regular), Italic Variable (Thin-Black; Extra-condensed-Regular)	2840	3316 (Variable) 3327 (Variable Italic)	For Latin, Cyrillic and Greek
Noto Sans Mono	2.014	Variable (Thin-Black; Extra-condensed-Regular)	3490	3911	For Latin, Cyrillic and Greek
Noto Serif	2.013	Variable (Thin-Black; Extra-condensed-Regular), Italic Variable (Thin-Black; Extra-condensed-Regular)	2965 (Variable) 2964 (Variable Italic)	3818 (Variable) 3828 (Variable Italic)	For Latin, Cyrillic and Greek
Noto Serif Display	2.009	Variable (Thin-Black; Extra-condensed-Regular), Italic Variable (Thin-Black; Extra-condensed-Black)	2840	3256 (Variable) 3268 (Variable Italic)	For Latin, Cyrillic and Greek
Noto Sans Adlam	3.001	Variable (Regular-Bold)	346	653	
Noto Sans Adlam Unjoined	3.001	Variable (Regular-Bold)	346	447	
Noto Serif Ahom	2.007	Regular	332	414	
Noto Sans Anatolian Hieroglyphs	2.001	Regular	334	924	
Noto Kufi Arabic	2.107	Variable (Thin-Black)	563	1066	
Noto Naskh Arabic	2.016	Variable (Regular-Bold)	1357	1949	
Noto Naskh Arabic UI	2.014	Variable (Regular-Bold)	1041	1597	
Noto Sans Arabic	2.010	Variable (Thin-Black; Extra-condensed-Regular)	1161	1642	
Noto Sans Arabic UI	2.004	Variable (Thin-Black; Extra-condensed-Regular)	1161	1563	
Noto Sans Armenian	2.008	Variable (Thin-Black; Extra-condensed-Regular)	434	441	
Noto Serif Armenian	2.008	Variable (Thin-Black; Extra-condensed-Regular)	434	440	
Noto Sans Avestan	2.003	Regular	398	409	
Noto Sans Balinese	2.004	Variable (Regular-Bold)	460	694	
Noto Serif Balinese	2.005	Regular	458	549	
Noto Sans Bamum	2.002	Variable (Regular-Bold)	991	996	
Noto Sans Bassa Vah	2.002	Variable (Regular-Bold)	372	384	
Noto Sans Batak	2.003	Regular	395	425	
Noto Sans Bengali	2.003	Variable (Thin-Black; Extra-condensed-Regular)	456	1030	
Noto Sans Bengali UI	2.001	Variable (Thin-Black; Extra-condensed-Regular)	173	695	
Noto Serif Bengali	2.003	Variable (Thin-Black; Extra-condensed-Regular)	456	925	
Noto Sans Bhaiksuki	2.002	Regular	434	1198	
Noto Sans Brahmi	2.003	Regular	448	592	
Noto Sans Buginese	2.002	Regular	370	376	
Noto Sans Buhid	2.001	Regular	361	379	
Noto Sans Canadian Aboriginal	2.003	Variable (Extra-light-Extra-bold)	1062	1090	
Noto Sans Carian	2.002	Regular	382	387	
Noto Sans Caucasian Albanian	2.005	Regular	392	499	
Noto Sans Chakma	2.003	Regular	429	585	
Noto Sans Cham	2.004	Variable (Thin-Black)	419	450	
Noto Sans Cherokee	2.001	Variable (Thin-Black)	511	601	
Noto Sans Chorasmian	1.003	Regular	362	454	
Noto Sans Coptic	2.004	Regular	520	561	
Noto Sans Cuneiform	2.001	Regular	1569	1574	
Noto Sans Cypriot	2.002	Regular	436	439	
Noto Sans Cypro Minoan	1.503	Regular	433	438	
Noto Sans Deseret	2.001	Regular	415	420	
Noto Sans Devanagari	2.004	Variable (Thin-Black; Extra-condensed-Regular)	552	1323	
Noto Sans Devanagari UI	2.001	Thin-Black; Extra-condensed-Regular	272	922	
Noto Serif Devanagari	2.004	Variable (Thin-Black; Extra-condensed-Regular)	552	1153	
Noto Serif Dives Akuru	1.001	Regular	75	168	
Noto Serif Dogra	1.007	Regular	401	478	
Noto Sans Duployan	3.001	Regular, Bold	491 (Both)	10639 (Regular) 10736 (Bold)	
Noto Sans Egyptian Hieroglyphs	2.001	Regular	1409	1414	No support for variation selectors or format controls.
Noto Sans Elbasan	2.004	Regular	403	412	
Noto Sans Elymaic	1.002	Regular	352	375	
Noto Emoji	2.001	Variable (Light-Bold)	1468 + 21 private use	1879	Black and white version.
Noto Color Emoji	2.034	Regular	1444 + 22 private use	20652	Prioritizes Apple/Android interchange over strict Unicode reproduction.
Noto Color Emoji Compat Test	1.000	Regular	1417 + 1 private use	3701	
Noto Sans Ethiopic	2.102	Variable (Thin-Black; Extra-condensed-Regular)	860	925	
Noto Serif Ethiopic	2.102	Variable (Thin-Black; Extra-condensed-Regular)	860	923	
Noto Sans Georgian	2.003	Variable (Thin-Black; Extra-condensed-Regular)	512	554	
Noto Serif Georgian	2.003	Variable (Thin-Black; Extra-condensed-Regular)	512	553	
Noto Sans Glagolitic	2.003	Regular	477	482	
Noto Sans Gothic	2.001	Regular	365	376	
Noto Sans Grantha	2.003	Regular	452	813	
Noto Serif Grantha	2.004	Regular	452	813	
Noto Sans Gujarati	2.105	Variable (Thin-Black; Extra-condensed-Regular)	445	1162	
Noto Sans Gujarati UI	2.001	Thin-Black	164	816	
Noto Serif Gujarati	2.105	Variable (Thin-Black; Extra-condensed-Regular)	445	739	
Noto Sans Gunjala Gondi	1.004	Variable (Regular-Bold)	399	585	
Noto Sans Gurmukhi	2.004	Variable (Thin-Black; Extra-condensed-Regular)	436	615	
Noto Sans Gurmukhi UI	2.001	Regular	154	344	
Noto Serif Gurmukhi	2.004	Variable (Thin-Black; Extra-condensed-Regular)	436	627	
Noto Sans Hanifi Rohingya	2.102	Variable (Regular-Bold)	392	510	
Noto Sans Hanunoo	2.004	Regular	360	380	
Noto Sans Hatran	2.001	Regular	362	367	
Noto Rashi Hebrew	1.006	Variable (Thin-Black)	429	437	
Noto Sans Hebrew	2.003	Variable (Thin-Black; Extra-condensed-Regular)	476	485	
Noto Serif Hebrew	2.003	Variable (Thin-Black; Extra-condensed-Regular)	475	484	
Noto Serif Hentaigana	1.000	Variable (Regular-Bold)	448	291	
Noto Sans HK	2.004	Variable (Thin-Black)	20297	20940	
Noto Serif HK	2.002	Variable (Thin-Black)	20299	20933	
Noto Sans Imperial Aramaic	2.001	Regular	366	371	
Noto Sans Indic Siyaq Numbers	2.002	Regular	424	430	
Noto Sans Inscriptional Pahlavi	2.003	Regular	362	370	
Noto Sans Inscriptional Parthian	2.003	Regular	363	379	
Noto Sans Javanese	2.005	Variable (Regular-Bold)	428	738	
Noto Sans JP	2.004	Variable (Thin-Black)	16088	17936	
Noto Serif JP	2.002	Variable (Thin-Black)	16085	17923	
Noto Sans Kaithi	2.005	Regular	427	656	
Noto Sans Kannada	2.005	Variable (Thin-Black; Extra-condensed-Regular)	445	987	
Noto Sans Kannada UI	2.001	Variable (Thin-Black; Extra-condensed-Regular)	164	655	
Noto Serif Kannada	2.005	Variable (Thin-Black)	445	700	
Noto Sans Kawi	1.000	Variable (Regular-Bold)	419	489	
Noto Sans Kayah Li	2.002	Variable (Regular-Bold)	387	394	
Noto Sans Kharoshthi	2.004	Regular	406	487	
Noto Fangsong KSSRotated	1.000	Regular	497	1917	
Noto Fangsong KSSVertical	1.000	Regular	497	1917	
Noto Serif Khitan Small Script	1.000	Regular	813	11683	
Noto Sans Khmer	2.004	Variable (Thin-Black; Extra-condensed-Regular)	487	681	
Noto Sans Khmer UI	2.001	Variable (Thin-Black; Extra-condensed-Regular)	175	381	
Noto Serif Khmer	2.004	Variable (Thin-Black; Extra-condensed-Regular)	487	677	
Noto Sans Khojki	2.005	Regular	418	509	
Noto Serif Khojki	2.005	Variable (Regular-Bold)	424	703	
Noto Sans Khudawadi	2.003	Regular	419	445	
Noto Sans KR	2.004	Variable (Thin-Black)	22451	24964	
Noto Serif KR	2.002	Variable (Thin-Black)	22407	24910	
Noto Sans Lao	2.003	Variable (Thin-Black; Extra-condensed-Regular)	421	466	
Noto Sans Lao Looped	1.002	Variable (Thin-Black; Extra-condensed-Regular)	429	487	
Noto Sans Lao UI	2.000	Regular	76	118	Unlooped.
Noto Serif Lao	2.003	Variable (Thin-Black; Extra-condensed-Regular)	421	467	
Noto Sans Lepcha	2.006	Regular	411	470	
Noto Sans Limbu	2.004	Regular	409	416	
Noto Sans Linear A	2.002	Regular	722	726	
Noto Sans Linear B	2.002	Regular	603	608	
Noto Sans Lisu	2.102	Variable (Regular-Bold)	390	395	
Noto Sans Lycian	2.002	Regular	363	366	
Noto Sans Lydian	2.002	Regular	363	368	
Noto Sans Mahajani	2.003	Regular	399	404	
Noto Serif Makasar	1.001	Regular	357	362	
Noto Sans Malayalam	2.104	Variable (Thin-Black; Extra-condensed-Regular)	467	697	
Noto Sans Malayalam UI	2.001	Variable (Thin-Black; Extra-condensed-Regular)	187	364	
Noto Serif Malayalam	2.104	Variable (Thin-Black)	467	687	
Noto Sans Mandaic	2.002	Regular	368	467	
Noto Sans Manichaean	2.005	Regular	391	488	
Noto Sans Marchen	2.003	Regular	404	1083	
Noto Sans Masaram Gondi	1.004	Regular	413	521	
Noto Sans Math	2.539	Regular	2818	4610	
Noto Sans Mayan Numerals	2.001	Regular	355	360	
Noto Sans Medefaidrin	1.002	Variable (Regular-Bold)	426	431	
Noto Sans Meetei Mayek	2.002	Variable (Thin-Black)	419	428	
Noto Sans Mende Kikakui	2.003	Regular	549	563	
Noto Sans Meroitic	2.002	Regular	458	466	
Noto Sans Miao	2.003	Regular	485	700	
Noto Sans Modi	2.004	Regular	426	542	
Noto Sans Mongolian	2.003	Regular	545	1888	
Noto Sans Mro	2.001	Regular	378	382	
Noto Sans Multani	2.002	Regular	385	390	
Noto Music	2.003	Regular	890	914	
Noto Sans Myanmar	2.107	Variable (Thin-Black; Extra-condensed-Regular)	564	949	
Noto Sans Myanmar UI	2.000	Thin, Extra-light, Light, Regular, Medium, Semi-bold, Bold, Extra-bold, Black	239	610	
Noto Serif Myanmar	2.106	Variable (Thin-Black; Extra-condensed-Regular)	564	1079	
Noto Sans Nabataean	2.001	Regular	375	380	
Noto Sans Nag Mundari	1.000	Variable (Regular-Bold)	377	383	
Noto Sans Nandinagari	1.002	Regular	422	1009	
Noto Nastaliq Urdu	3.009	Variable (Regular-Bold)	668	1707	
Noto Sans New Tai Lue	2.004	Variable (Regular-Bold)	436	442	
Noto Sans Newa	2.007	Regular	434	945	
Noto Sans N'ko	2.004	Regular	408	516	
Noto Sans N'ko Todelist	2.001	Regular	79	184	
Noto Sans N'ko Unjoined	2.004	Variable (Regular-Bold)	408	417	
Noto Sans Nushu	1.003	Regular	730	734	
Noto Traditional Nushu	2.003	Variable (Light-Bold)	767	774	Used for larger font sizes.
Noto Serif Nyiakeng Puachue Hmong	1.000	Variable (Light-Bold)	75	76	
Noto Serif NP Hmong	1.001	Variable (Regular-Bold)	407	411	
Noto Sans Ogham	2.001	Regular	364	369	
Noto Sans Ol Chiki	2.003	Variable (Regular-Bold)	384	390	
Noto Sans Old Hungarian	2.005	Regular	445	695	
Noto Sans Old Italic	2.003	Regular	374	400	
Noto Sans Old North Arabian	2.001	Regular	367	371	
Noto Sans Old Permic	2.001	Regular	382	390	
Noto Sans Old Persian	2.001	Regular	385	390	
Noto Sans Old Sogdian	2.002	Regular	376	396	
Noto Sans Old South Arabian	2.001	Regular	367	372	
Noto Sans Old Turkic	2.003	Regular	408	413	
Noto Serif Old Uyghur	1.003	Regular	361	461	
Noto Sans Oriya	2.005	Variable (Thin-Black; Extra-condensed-Regular)	434	877	
Noto Sans Oriya UI	2.000	Thin, Regular, Bold, Black	150	513	
Noto Serif Oriya	1.051	Variable (Regular-Bold)	433	1025	
Noto Sans Osage	2.002	Regular	409	416	
Noto Sans Osmanya	2.001	Regular	375	380	
Noto Serif Ottoman Siyaq Numbers	1.006	Regular	392	396	
Noto Sans Pahawh Hmong	2.001	Regular	465	470	
Noto Sans Palmyrene	2.001	Regular	367	392	
Noto Pau Cin Hau	2.002	Regular	392	396	
Noto Sans Phags Pa	2.003	Regular	94	385	
Noto Sans Phoenician	2.001	Regular	364	369	
Noto Sans Psalter Pahlavi	2.002	Regular	368	433	
Noto Sans Rejang	2.002	Regular	374	378	
Noto Sans Runic	2.002	Regular	426	431	
Noto Sans Samaritan	2.001	Regular	397	403	
Noto Sans Saurashtra	2.002	Regular	419	429	
Noto Sans SC	2.004	Variable (Thin-Black)	30393	31036	
Noto Serif SC	2.002	Variable (Thin-Black)	30424	31058	
Noto Sans Sharada	2.006	Regular	435	568	
Noto Sans Shavian	2.001	Regular	383	388	
Noto Sans Siddham	2.005	Regular	428	839	
Noto Sans Sign Writing	2.005	Regular	1008	38218	
Noto Sans Sinhala	2.006	Variable (Thin-Black; Extra-condensed-Regular)	453	979	
Noto Sans Sinhala UI	2.001	Variable (Thin-Black; Extra-condensed-Regular)	170	645	
Noto Serif Sinhala	2.007	Variable (Thin-Black; Extra-condensed-Regular)	451	976	
Noto Sans Sogdian	2.002	Regular	380	680	
Noto Sans Sora Sompeng	2.101	Variable (Regular-Bold)	371	376	
Noto Sans Soyombo	2.001	Regular	419	658	
Noto Sans Sundanese	2.005	Variable (Regular-Bold)	410	421	
Noto Sans Sunuwar	1.000	Regular	371	374	
Noto Sans Syloti Nagri	2.004	Regular	397	419	
Noto Sans Symbols	2.003	Variable (Thin-Black)	1107	1115	
Noto Sans Symbols 2	2.005	Regular	2930	2951	Includes symbols that normally don't have different weights.
Noto Sans Syriac	3.000	Variable (Thin-Black)	456	604	Three different varieties for Syriac with the first being of ʾEsṭrangēlā style (see Syriac for more information)
Noto Sans Syriac Eastern	3.001	Variable (Thin-Black)	456	600	Three different varieties for Syriac with the first being of ʾEsṭrangēlā style (see Syriac for more information)
Noto Sans Syriac Western	3.000	Variable (Thin-Black)	150	296	Three different varieties for Syriac with the first being of ʾEsṭrangēlā style (see Syriac for more information)
Noto Serif Syriac	1.000	(Variable (Regular-Bold)	506	615	Includes Syriac Letters for Suriyani Malayalam
Noto Sans Tagalog	2.002	Regular	362	367	
Noto Sans Tagbanwa	2.001	Regular	359	364	
Noto Sans Tai Le	2.002	Regular	390	406	
Noto Sans Tai Tham	2.002	Variable (Regular-Bold)	466	1158	
Noto Sans Tai Viet	2.004	Regular	409	413	
Noto Sans Takri	2.005	Regular	415	428	
Noto Sans Tamil	2.004	Variable (Thin-Black; Extra-condensed-Regular)	428	576	
Noto Sans Tamil UI	2.001	Variable (Thin-Black; Extra-condensed-Regular)	147	244	
Noto Sans Tamil Supplement	2.001	Regular	384	388	Additional Tamil characters.
Noto Serif Tamil	2.004	Variable (Thin-Black; Extra-condensed-Regular), Variable Italic (Thin-Black; Extra-codennsed-regular)	428	506	
Noto Sans Tangsa	1.506	Variable (Regular-Bold)	422	425	
Noto Sans Tangut	1.000	Regular	7376	7381	
Noto Serif Tangut	2.169	Regular	7376	7381	
Noto Sans TC	2.004	Variable (Thin-Black)	20305	20950	
Noto Serif TC	2.002	Variable (Thin-Black)	20306	20940	
Noto Sans Telugu	2.005	Variable (Thin-Black; Extra-condensed-Regular)	444	1291	
Noto Sans Telugu UI	2.001	Variable (Thin-Black; Extra-condensed-Regular)	163	958	
Noto Serif Telugu	2.005	Variable (Thin-Black)	444	1072	
Noto Sans Test	1.000	Regular	2	3	Used for testing.
Noto Serif Test	1.000	Variable (Regular-Bold)	2	3	Used for testing.
Noto Sans Thaana	3.001	Variable (Thin-Black)	409	414	
Noto Sans Thai	2.002	Variable (Thin-Black; Extra-condensed-Regular)	430	472	
Noto Sans Thai Looped	1.001	Variable (Thin-Black; Extra-condensed-Regular)	448	515	
Noto Looped Thai	1.001	Variable (Thin-Black; Extra-condensed-Regular)	448	515	Older name of the font above.
Noto Sans Thai UI	2.000	Variable (Thin-Black; Extra-condensed-Regular)	101	140	
Noto Serif Thai	2.002	Variable (Thin-Black; Extra-condensed-Regular)	430	471	
Noto Serif Tibetan	2.103	Variable (Thin-Black)	552	2226	
Noto Sans Tifinagh	2.006	Regular	76	275	
Noto Sans Tifinagh Adrar	2.006	Regular	76	275	
Noto Sans Tiifinagh Agraw Imazighen	2.006	Regular	76	275	
Noto Sans Tifinagh Air	2.006	Regular	76	275	
Noto Sans Tifinagh APT	2.006	Regular	76	275	
Noto Sans Tifinagh Azawagh	2.006	Regular	76	275	
Noto Sans Tifinagh Ghat	2.006	Regular	76	275	
Noto Sans Tifinagh Hawad	2.006	Regular	76	275	
Noto Sans Tifinagh Rhissa Ixa	2.006	Regular	76	275	
Noto Sans Tifinagh SIL	2.006	Regular	76	275	
Noto Sans Tifinagh Tawellement	2.006	Regular	76	275	
Noto Sans Tirhuta	2.003	Regular	439	597	
Noto Serif Todhri	1.000	Regular	35	52	
Noto Serif Toto	2.001	Variable (Regular-Bold)	367	373	
Noto Sans Ugaritic	2.001	Regular	366	371	
Noto Sans Vai	2.001	Regular	635	640	
Noto Sans Vithkuqi	1.001	Variable (Regular-Bold)	403	408	
Noto Serif Vithkuqi	1.005	Variable (Regular-Bold)	403	407	
Noto Sans Wancho	2.001	Regular	395	415	
Noto Sans Warang Citi	3.002	Regular	421	514	
Noto Serif Yezidi	1.001	Variable (Regular-Bold)	387	391	
Noto Sans Yi	2.002	Regular	1586	1591	
Noto Sans Zanabazar Square	2.006	Regular	406	485	
Noto Znamenny Musical Notation	1.003	Regular	515	527	

== Usage ==
Some projects provide a package for installing Noto fonts, e.g. Debian, Arch Linux, Fedora Linux, Gentoo Linux, CTAN. Since version 6.0, LibreOffice bundles Noto.

In 2019 IKEA adopted a lightly modified version of Noto Sans – Noto IKEA – as its corporate typeface, replacing Verdana.

== See also ==
- Open-source Unicode typefaces
- Cantarell, the default typeface in past versions of GNOME
- Droid (typeface), the default fonts for first versions of Android
  - Open Sans, another font based on Droid Sans
  - Roboto, the default fonts for newer versions of Android
- IBM Plex, free and open-source fonts from IBM
- National Fonts, free and open-source Thai fonts
- PT Fonts, free and open-source fonts from Russia
- STIX Fonts project, typefaces intended to serve the scientific and engineering community
