= Roboto =

Open-source typeface family

- Category: Sans-serif
- Classification: Neo-grotesque
- Designer: Christian Robertson
- Commissioned by: Google
- Foundry: Google
- Date created: 2011
- Date released: 2011; 15 years ago
- License: Apache License
- Design based on: Normal-Grotesk
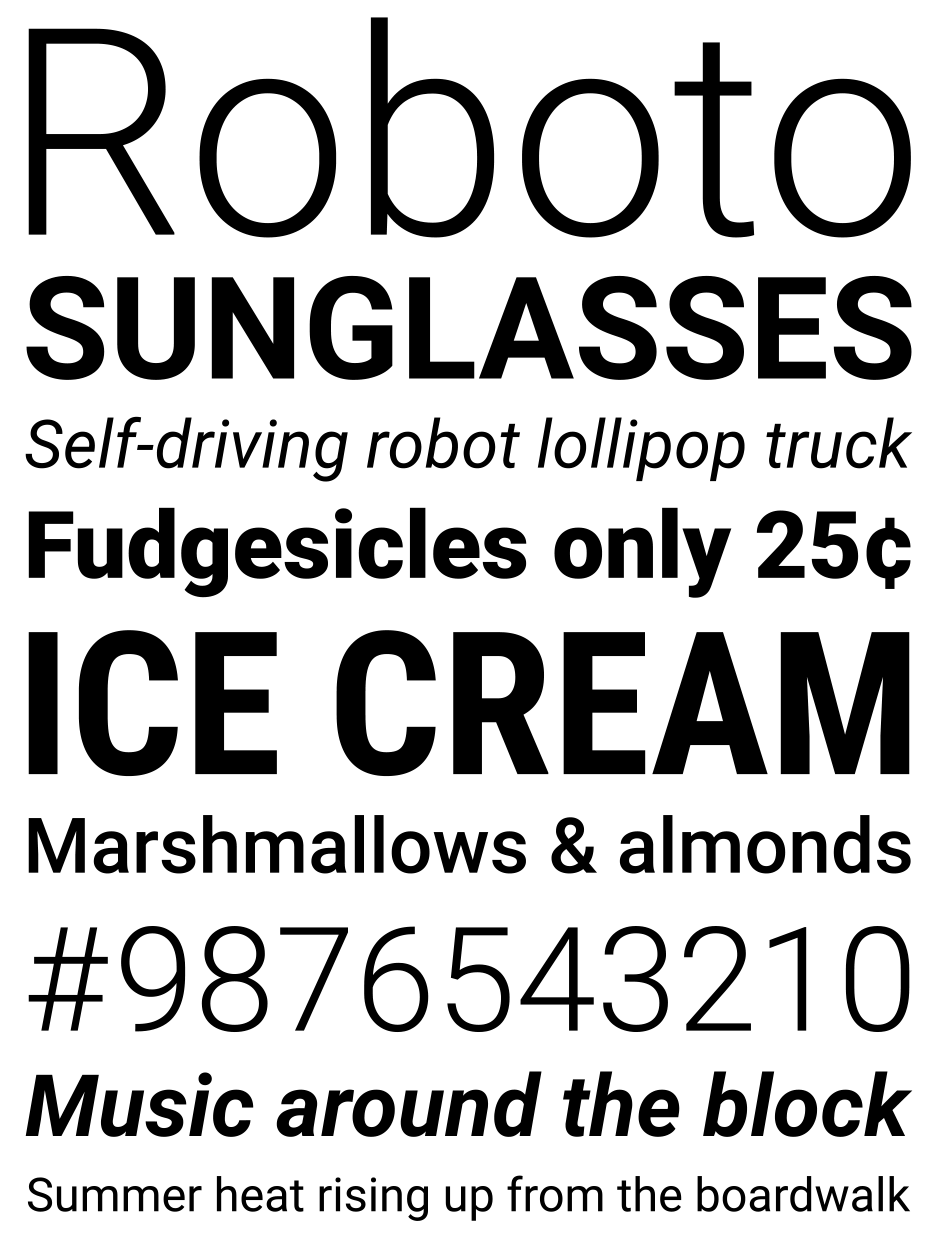
- Sample
- Latest release version: v3.009
- Latest release date: 8 January 2025
- Metrically compatible with: Crique Grotesk; Helvetica (before redesign)

Roboto (/roʊˈbɒt.oʊ/) is a typeface family developed by Google. The first typeface was created as the system font for its Android operating system, and released in 2011 for Android Ice Cream Sandwich.

The entire font family has been licensed under the Apache license. In 2014, Roboto was redesigned for Android 5.0 "Lollipop". Most variants of Roboto have been licensed or re-licensed under the OFL: Roboto (the default sans serif font), Roboto Condensed, Roboto Flex, Roboto Mono, and Roboto Serif.

== Usage ==
Roboto is one of the most popular typeface families on the Internet and has been used on Google services such as Google Play, YouTube, Google Maps, and Google Images since 2013. It is the default system font on Android, while Roboto Bold is the default font in Unreal Engine 4, and in Kodi's then default skin, Confluence, until 2017. Roboto was also the basis of another popular typeface Inter, although later versions of Inter were developed independent of Roboto.

Roboto was used on the LCD countdown clocks of the New York City Subway's B Division lines in 2017. Roboto Condensed is used to display Information on European versions of Nintendo Switch packaging, including physical releases of games.

Utsav Network uses Roboto for its wordmark. The Indonesian news TV channel iNews also uses a slightly modified Roboto on its logo. Since October 2022, Global News has also used Roboto in its on-air presentation, however the font is not used in main network presentation. In addition, the United Nations uses Roboto on its website and in official documents.

== History ==
Android's previous system typeface, Droid Sans, was designed for the low-resolution displays of the very early Android devices, and did not display well in larger, higher-resolution screens of later models. It was decided that a more modern typeface, designed from scratch, was needed for the newer displays.

=== Early development (2011) ===
Sample text of Roboto in 2013 in various font weights and sizes, prior to the redesign for Android 5. Unlike now, the leg of the R has a curl, the same as in Helvetica.

The new typeface, Roboto, was designed entirely in-house by Christian Robertson who previously had released an expanded Ubuntu Titling font through his personal type foundry Betatype. The font was officially made available for free download on 12 January 2012, on the newly launched Android Design website.

Compared to the humanist sans-serif Droid Sans, Roboto belongs to the neo-grotesque genre of sans-serif typefaces. It includes Thin, Light, Regular, Medium, Bold and Black weights with matching oblique styles rather than true italics. It also includes condensed styles in Light, Regular and Bold, also with matching oblique designs.

=== "Material Design" redesign (2014) ===
On 25 June 2014, Matias Duarte announced at Google I/O that Roboto was significantly redesigned for Android 5.0 "Lollipop". Punctuation marks and the tittles in the lowercase "i" and "j" were changed from square to rounded, the leg part of the uppercase "R" were changed from curved to straight, the bottom surface of the top part of the number "1" points downwards instead of horizontal, the tail part of the numbers "6" and "9" have been slightly shortened (in resemblance to "Trebuchet MS"), the stem part of the number "7" becomes curved to straight, and the entire typeface was made "slightly wider and rounder" with many changes in details. The newly-redesigned version of Roboto is also offered in a wider range of font weights, adding Thin (100), Medium (500), and Black (900) alongside Light (300), Regular (400), and Bold (700).

== Language support ==
Roboto supports Latin, Greek and Cyrillic scripts.

On Android, the Noto fonts are used for languages not supported by Roboto, including Chinese (simplified and traditional), Japanese, Korean, Thai and Hindi (as of June 2026)

== Variations ==
=== Roboto Mono ===
Roboto Mono
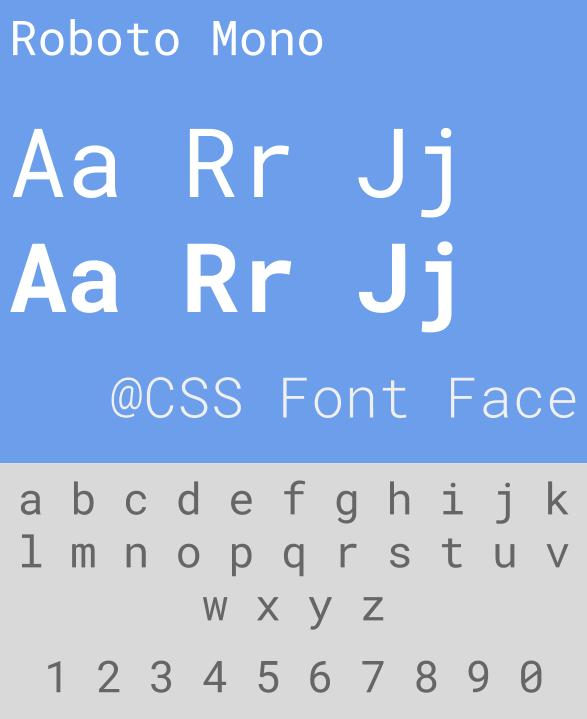
- Category: Sans-serif
- Classification: Monospaced
- Designer: Christian Robertson
- Commissioned by: Google
- Foundry: Google
- Date released: 2015
- Sample

Roboto Mono is a monospace font based on Roboto. It is available in seven weights: thin, extra-light, light, regular, medium, semi-bold and bold, with oblique stylings for each weight.

=== Roboto Serif ===
Roboto Serif is a companion typeface with serifs designed by Greg Gazdowicz of Commercial Type. It was debuted in 2022 to fill the serif niche. It is a readable retro-styled typeface whose letters have been redrawn from scratch, with the same vertical height as Roboto. Roboto Serif has both a regular and a true italic form. Roboto Serif is a variable font with four axes: Weight, width, optical size, and a "grade" axis which can make the font thinner or thicker without affecting its metrics.

=== Roboto Slab ===
Roboto Slab
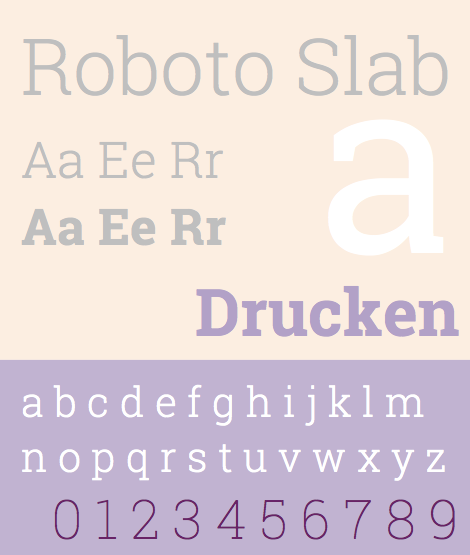
- Category: Serif
- Classification: Slab serif
- Designer: Christian Robertson
- Commissioned by: Google
- Date released: March 2013
- Latest release version: 1.100263

Roboto Slab is a slab serif font based on Roboto. It was introduced in March 2013, as the default font in Google's note-taking service Google Keep. (The font was changed to the sans-serif Roboto in 2018.) It is available in four weights: thin, light, regular and bold. However, no oblique versions were released for it.

In November 2019, the typeface was updated, adding five new weights (Extra-Light, Medium, Semi-Bold, Extra-Bold and Black) and a variable font axis ranging from 100 to 900, along with modifications to certain characters, matching the updated (2014) version of the sans-serif Roboto.

=== Variable Fonts ===
As of 2026, Roboto has two variable font versions, namely Roboto VF and Roboto Flex.

==== Roboto VF ====
Roboto VF is intended to be a 1:1 match with the static version of Roboto and has three adjustable axes.

==== Roboto Flex ====
Roboto Flex has 12 adjustable axes, including optical size. However, unlike Roboto VF, Roboto Flex is not designed to perfectly match with the static version of Roboto. Roboto Flex supports Latin, Greek, and Cyrillic characters.

=== Heebo ===
Heebo is an extension of Roboto that includes Hebrew characters.

=== Piboto ===
Piboto is a fork of Roboto, based on the original version of Roboto before the 2014 redesign. Adopted by Simon Long (UX engineer at Raspberry Pi), Piboto was used as the system font on Raspberry Pi OS until October 2025.

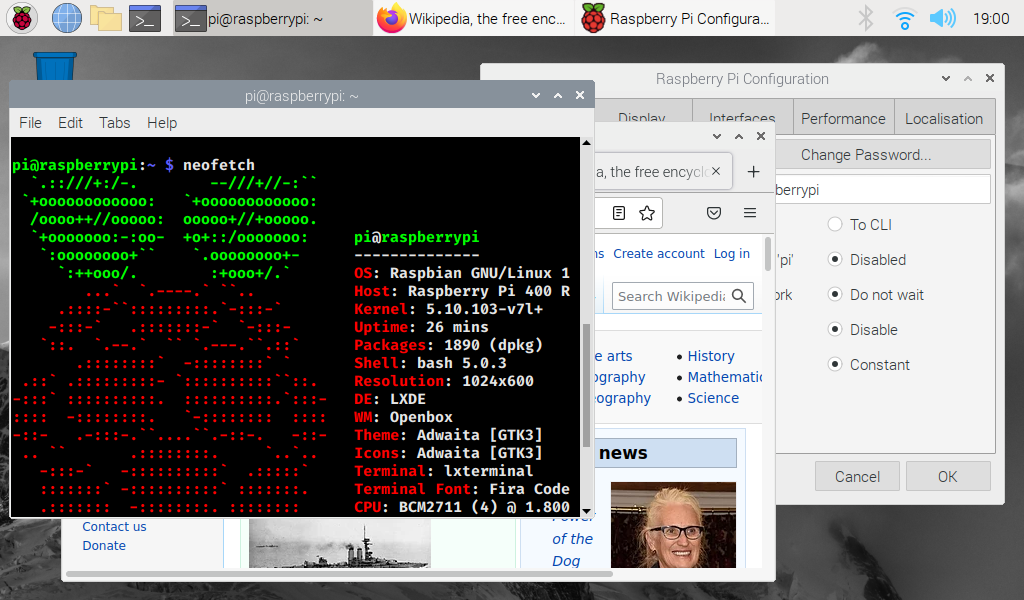
Previous version of Raspberry Pi OS featuring Piboto as the system font

Piboto is released under a mix of the SIL Open Font License and the Apache License. The type family has been archived and is publicly available.

== Reception ==
Google developed Roboto to be "modern, yet approachable" and "emotional", but the initial release (i.e., before the Android 5.0 redesign) received mixed reviews.

Joshua Topolsky, Editor-In-Chief of technology news and media network The Verge, describes the typeface as "clean and modern, but not overly futuristic – not a science fiction font".

The 2014 redesign for Android 5.0 Lollipop was largely seen as an improvement, with reviewers noting the font was made "rounder and wider," giving it a more pleasant look, and improving clarity on a spectrum of devices from smartphones to large-format displays.

Industry reaction to Roboto's evolution was generally positive, especially regarding its utility in UI and UX contexts. The typeface was widely adopted even outside of the Android ecosystem, serving as a default or recommended font in numerous Google services and third-party applications, and becoming a go-to choice for web designers seeking a modern, legible, and versatile sans-serif font. Quantitative studies have confirmed this ubiquity: by 2024, Roboto—together with Open Sans—was found to account for 51% of all Google Font views, while other analytics reported more than 200 billion views and extensive use on tens of millions of websites.

In user and laboratory-based analyses, Roboto has demonstrated good on-screen legibility, typically ranking highly among sans-serif fonts. Studies have shown that Roboto performs comparably to other major screen fonts like Arial and Open Sans in terms of user preference and readability metrics, with slight differences in specific areas such as reading speed and comprehension.

== See also ==
- Open-source Unicode typefaces
- Cantarell, the default typeface in past versions of GNOME
- Droid (typeface), the default fonts for older versions of Android (below Android 4.4.4)
  - Noto fonts, the default fonts for newer versions of Android (above Android 4.4.4)
  - Open Sans, another font based on Droid Sans
- IBM Plex, free and open-source fonts from IBM
- National Fonts, free and open-source Thai fonts
- PT Fonts, free and open-source fonts from Russia
- STIX Fonts project, typefaces intended to serve the scientific and engineering community
