= SIL Open Font License =

Type of license

- Author: SIL Global
- Latest version: 1.1
- Published: February 2007; 19 years ago
- Debian FSG compatible: Yes
- FSF approved: Yes
- OSI approved: Yes
- Copyleft: Yes
- Website: openfontlicense.org

The SIL Open Font License (or OFL in short) is one of the major open font licenses, which allows embedding, or "bundling", of the font in commercially sold products.

OFL is a free and open source license. It was created by SIL Global, the organization behind Ethnologue.

== History ==
The Open Font License was created by SIL Global employees Victor Gaultney and Nicolas Spalinger. Gaultney had previously designed the Gentium font and was unsatisfied with existing font licenses.

The Open Font License was designed for use with many of SIL's Unicode fonts, including Gentium, Charis SIL, and Andika. The license was in a "public review" stage between 2005 and 2007 and version 1.1 was published in February 2007.

Prior to the release of the OFL, the Bitstream Vera fonts had been released in 2003 under most of the same terms and conditions.

Open-source fonts are a popular choice among designers, and most open-source fonts utilize the Open Font License. For example, it was used to license a font made by the US government.

== Terms ==
The Open Font License is a free software license, and as such permits the fonts to be used, modified, and distributed freely (so long as the resulting fonts remain under the Open Font License). However, the copyright holder may declare the font's name as being a "Reserved Font Name", which modified versions then cannot bear. (This includes subsetting for web fonts.) The license permits covered fonts to be freely embedded in documents under any terms. The only stipulation is that fonts cannot be sold on their own, though they may be included in software bundles for sale.

The license is considered free by the Free Software Foundation (FSF) and the Debian project. Although the license requires fonts to be bundled with software when sold, FSF states that this requirement is harmless because it can be satisfied with a simple hello world program.

== See also ==
- GPL font exception
- Ubuntu Font License
