= Thai script =

Abugida script for languages spoken in Thailand

Thai อักษรไทย
- Script type: Abugida
- Creator: Ramkhamhaeng the Great
- Period: 1283–present
- Direction: Left-to-right
- Official script: Thailand
- Languages: Standard form: Thai, Southern Thai; Non-standard form: Lanna, Isan, Phu Thai, Pattani Malay, Urak Lawoi, Phuan and others

Related scripts
- Parent systems: Egyptian hieroglyphs: Proto-Sinaitic; Phoenician; Aramaic; Brahmi; Tamil-Brahmi; Pallava; Old Khmer; Sukhothai; Thai
- Child systems: Tai Viet
- Sister systems: Fakkham

ISO 15924
- ISO 15924: Thai (352), Thai

Unicode
- Unicode alias: Thai
- Unicode range: U+0E00–U+0E7F

The Thai script (Thai: อักษรไทย, RTGS: akson thai, pronounced [ʔàksɔ̌ːn tʰāj]) is the abugida used to write Thai, Southern Thai and many other languages spoken in Thailand. The Thai script itself (as used to write Thai) has 44 consonant symbols (Thai: พยัญชนะ, phayanchana), 16 vowel symbols (Thai: สระ, sara) that combine into at least 32 vowel forms, four tone diacritics (Thai: วรรณยุกต์ or วรรณยุต, wannayuk or wannayut), and other diacritics.

Although commonly referred to as the Thai alphabet, the script is not a true alphabet but an abugida, a writing system in which the full characters represent consonants with diacritical marks for vowels; the absence of a vowel diacritic gives an implied 'a' or 'o'. Consonants are written horizontally from left to right, and vowels following a consonant in speech are written above, below, to the left or to the right of it, or a combination of those.

== History ==
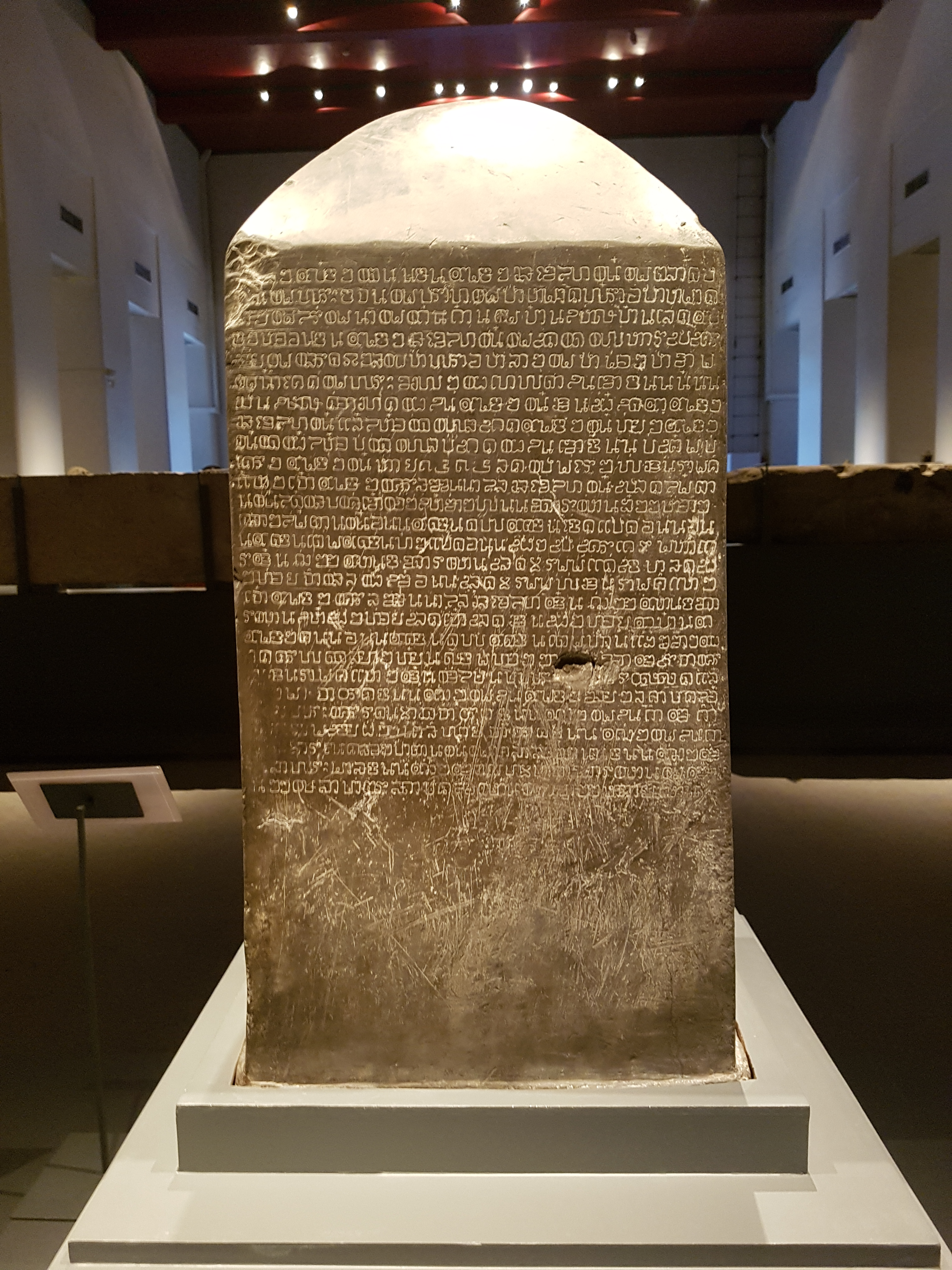
Ram Khamhaeng Inscription (Thai: จารึกพ่อขุนรามคำแหง) the oldest inscription using Sukhothai script (Bangkok National Museum)

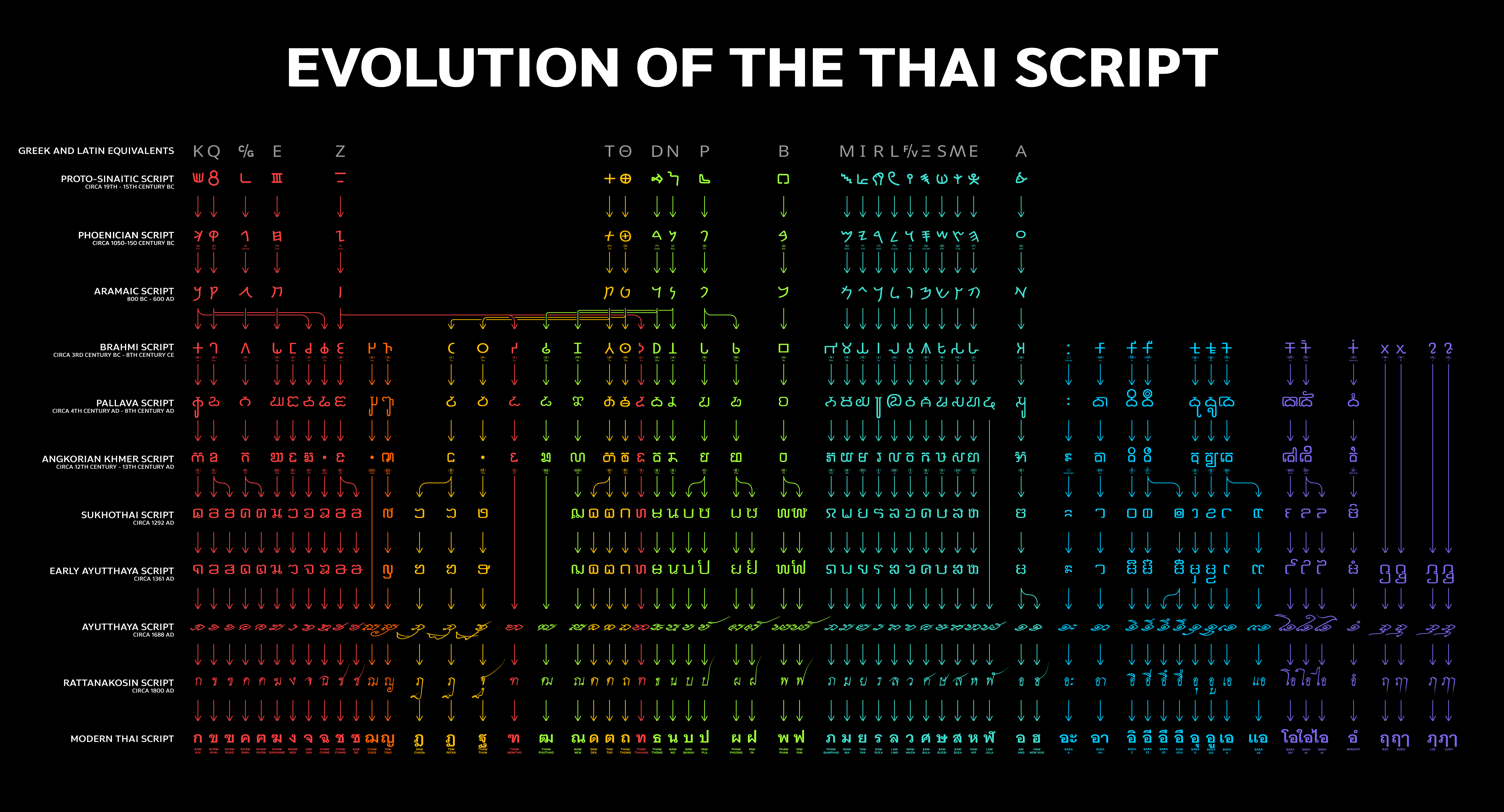
The evolution of the Thai alphabet

The Thai script is derived from the Old Khmer script (Thai: อักษรขอม, akson khom), a sophisticated writing system rooted in the South Indian Pallava alphabet (Thai: ปัลลวะ) and a southern branch of the ancient Brahmi tradition. The Sukhothai script was the earliest Thai script developed from the Old Khmer script. The Ram Khamhaeng Inscription dated to 1292 is often cited as the script's first appearance, yet many scholars question its authenticity and reliability as historical evidence. However, according to the Wat Bang Sanuk Inscription (C.107) in Phrae province, several scholars proposed that the earliest Thai script could be dated back to 1219.

The introduction of tone markers in the Thai script was an adaptation to record tonal features absent in the source languages such as Dravidian languages, Indo-Aryan languages and the Mon-Khmer (Austroasiatic languages) family. Although Chinese and other Sino-Tibetan languages also have distinctive tones in their phonological system, no tone marker was found in their orthographies at the time the Sukhothai script was created, making it probably the first orthography of a fully tonal language to mark tones in a practical writing system. Another addition was consonant clusters that were written horizontally and contiguously, rather than writing the second consonant below the first one. The vowel marks were written on the main line. However, the practices fell out of use not long after.

== Orthography ==
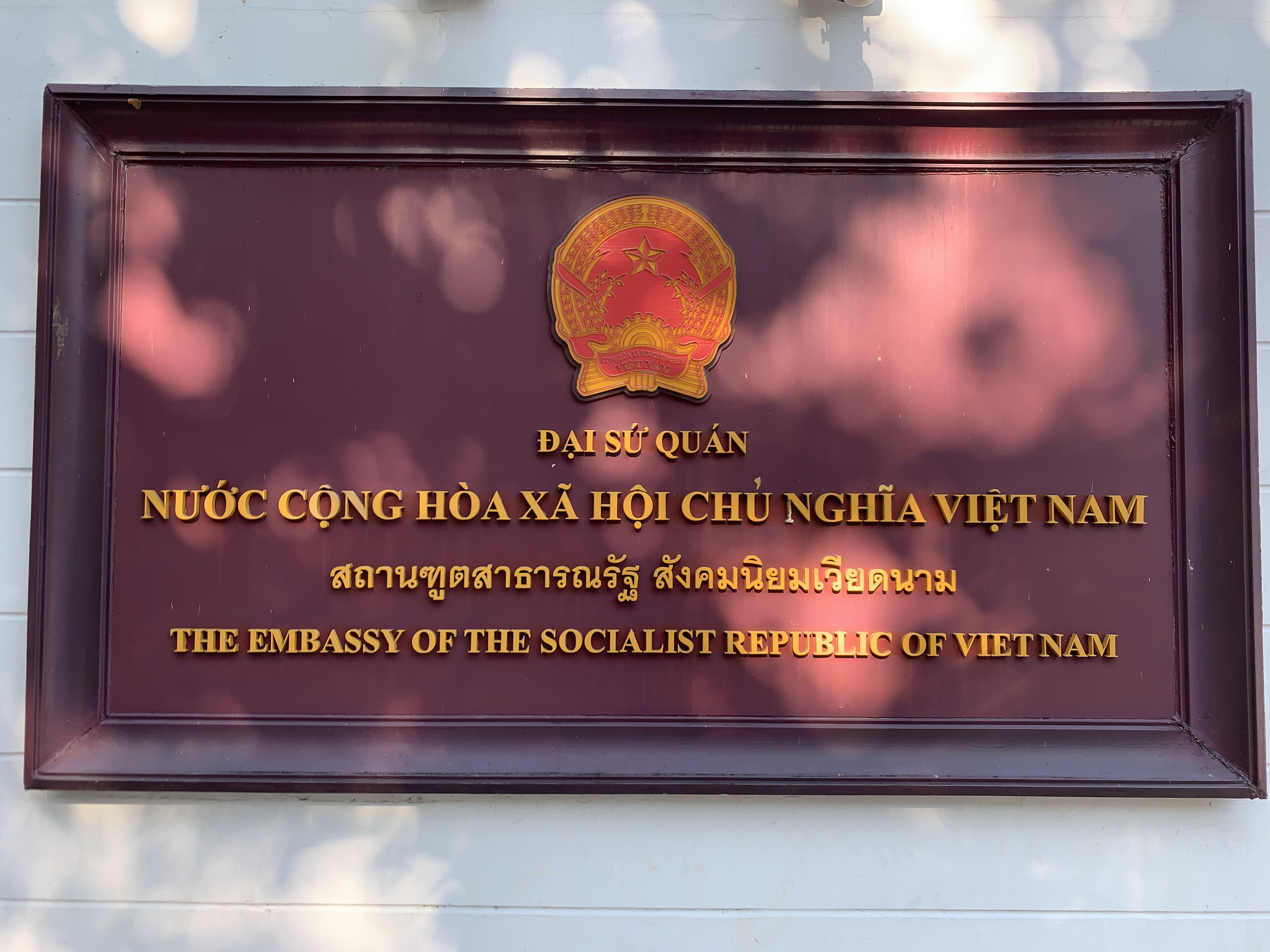
Here, the word meaning "embassy", which should be spelt สถานทูต, is misspelt สถานฑูต [sic] with tho montho instead of the correct tho thahan. These two letters look similar for untrained eyes and share the same class.

An example of Thai “wisdom tree sign” illustrating handwritten script variation. The text reads Thai: “อย่าหิวสวรรค์ .....มันจะผันไปนรก”, romanized: yà hǐu sà-wǎn man chà phǎn pai ná-rók, lit. 'Do not hunger (for) heaven .....it will turn into hell.' The sample demonstrates the characteristic placement of superscript vowels and tone marks, as well as the decorative flourishes and ligatures common in written & artistic Thai orthography that differ from standard print fonts.

There is a fairly complex relationship between spelling and sound. There are various issues:

- For many consonant sounds, there are two different letters that both represent the same sound, but which cause a different tone to be associated. This stems from a major change (a tone split) that occurred historically in the phonology of the Thai language. At the time the Thai script was created, the language had three tones and a full set of contrasts between voiced and unvoiced consonants at the beginning of a syllable (e.g. z vs. s). At a later time, the voicing distinction disappeared, but in the process, each of the three original tones split in two, with an originally voiced consonant (the modern "low" consonant signs) producing a lower-variant tone, and an originally unvoiced consonant (the modern "mid" and "high" consonant signs) producing a higher-variant tone.
- Thai borrowed a large number of words from Sanskrit and Pali, and the Thai alphabet was created so that the original spelling of these words could be preserved as much as possible. This means that the Thai alphabet has a number of "duplicate" letters that represent separate sounds in Sanskrit and Pali (e.g. the alveolo-palatal fricative ś) but which never represented distinct sounds in the Thai language. Some are used to indicate tone distinctions as mentioned above, and others are mostly or exclusively used in Sanskrit and Pali borrowings.
- The desire to preserve original Sanskrit and Pali spellings also produces a particularly large number of duplicate ways of spelling sounds at the end of a syllable (where Thai is strictly limited in the sounds that can occur but Sanskrit allowed all possibilities, especially once former final /a/ was deleted), as well as a number of silent letters. Moreover, many consonants from Sanskrit and Pali loanwords are generally silent. The spelling of the words resembles Sanskrit or Pali orthography:
  - Thai สามารถ (spelled sǎamaarth but pronounced sa-mat /sǎː mâːt/ with a silent r and a plain t that is represented using an aspirated consonant) "to be able" (Sanskrit समर्थ samartha)
  - Thai จันทร์ (spelled chanthr but pronounced chan /tɕān/ because the th and the r are silent) "moon" (Sanskrit चन्द्र chandra)
- Thai phonology dictates that all syllables must end in a vowel, an approximant, a nasal, or a voiceless plosive. Therefore, the letter written may not have the same pronunciation in the initial position as it does in the final position.
- Even though the high class letter ho hip ห is used to write the sound /h/, if the letter comes before a low class letter in a syllable, it becomes the silent ho nam and turn the initial consonant into high class.

Thai letters do not have upper- and lower-case forms like Latin letters do. Spaces between words are not used, except in certain linguistically motivated cases.

=== Punctuation ===
Minor pauses in sentences may be marked by a comma (Thai: จุลภาค or ลูกน้ำ, chunlaphak or luk nam), and major pauses by a period (Thai: มหัพภาค or จุด, mahap phak or chut), but most often are marked by a blank space (Thai: วรรค, wak). Thai writing also uses quotation marks (Thai: อัญประกาศ, anyaprakat) and parentheses (round brackets) (Thai: วงเล็บ, wong lep or Thai: นขลิขิต, nakha likhit), but not square brackets or braces.

A paiyan noi ฯ (Thai: ไปยาลน้อย) is used for abbreviation. A paiyan yai ฯลฯ (Thai: ไปยาลใหญ่) is the same as "etc." in English.

Several obsolete characters indicated the beginning or ending of sections. A bird's eye ๏ (Thai: ตาไก่, ta kai, officially called ฟองมัน, fong man) formerly indicated paragraphs. An angkhan kuu ๚ (Thai: อังคั่นคู่) was formerly used to mark the end of a chapter. A kho mut ๛ (Thai: โคมูตร) was formerly used to mark the end of a document, but is now obsolete.

== Alphabet listing ==
Thai (along with its sister system, Lao) lacks conjunct consonants and independent vowels, while both designs are common among Brahmic scripts (e.g., Burmese and Balinese). In scripts with conjunct consonants, each consonant has two forms: base and conjoined. Consonant clusters are represented with the two styles of consonants. The two styles may form typographical ligatures, as in Devanagari. Independent vowels are used when a syllable starts with a vowel sign.

=== Consonants ===
There are 44 consonant letters representing 21 distinct consonant sounds. Duplicate consonants either correspond to sounds that existed in Old Thai at the time the alphabet was created but no longer exist (in particular, voiced obstruents such as d), or different Sanskrit and Pali consonants pronounced identically in Thai. There are in addition four consonant-vowel combination characters not included in the tally of 44.

Consonants are divided into three classes—in alphabetical order these are middle (กลาง, klang), high (สูง, sung), and low (ต่ำ, tam) class—as shown in the table below. These class designations reflect phonetic qualities of the sounds to which the letters originally corresponded in Old Thai. In particular, "middle" sounds were voiceless unaspirated stops; "high" sounds, voiceless aspirated stops or voiceless fricatives; "low" sounds, voiced. Subsequent sound changes have obscured the phonetic nature of these classes. (Note: Modern Thai sounds /b/ and /d/ were formerly—and sometimes still are—pronounced /ʔb/ and /ʔd/. For this reason, they were treated as voiceless unaspirated, and hence placed in the "middle" class; this was also the reason they were unaffected by the changes that devoiced most originally voiced stops.) Today, the class of a consonant without a tone mark, along with the short or long length of the accompanying vowel, determine the base accent (พื้นเสียง, phuen siang). Middle class consonants with a long vowel spell an additional four tones with one of four tone marks over the controlling consonant: mai ek, mai tho, mai tri, and mai chattawa. Only middle class consonants can take the latter two, as shown in the. Differing interpretations of the two marks or their absence allow low class consonants to spell tones not allowed for the corresponding high class consonant. In the case of digraphs where a low class follows a higher class consonant, often the higher class rules apply, but the marker, if used, goes over the low class one; accordingly, ห นำ ho nam and อ นำ o nam may be considered to be digraphs as such, as explained below the Tone table. (Note: Only low class consonants may have a base accent determined by the syllable being both long and dead.)

Notes

To aid learning, each consonant is traditionally associated with an acrophonic Thai word that either starts with the same sound, or features it prominently. For example, the name of the letter ข is kho khai (ข ไข่), in which kho is the sound it represents, and khai (ไข่) is a word which starts with the same sound and means "egg".

Two of the consonants, ฃ (kho khuat) and ฅ (kho khon), are no longer used in written Thai, but still appear on many keyboards and in character sets. When the first Thai typewriter was developed by Edwin Hunter McFarland in 1892, there was simply no space for all characters, thus two had to be left out. Also, neither of these two letters correspond to a Sanskrit or Pali letter, and each of them, being a modified form of the letter that precedes it (compare ข and ค), has the same pronunciation and the same consonant class as the preceding letter, thus making them redundant. They used to represent the sound /x/ in Old Thai, but it has merged with /kʰ/ in Modern Thai.

Equivalents for romanisation are shown in the table below. Many consonants are pronounced differently at the beginning and at the end of a syllable. The entries in columns initial and final indicate the pronunciation for that consonant in the corresponding positions in a syllable. Where the entry is '-', the consonant may not be used to close a syllable. Where a combination of consonants ends a written syllable, only the first is pronounced; possible closing consonant sounds are limited to 'k', 'm', 'n', 'ng', 'p' and 't'.

Although official standards for romanisation are the Royal Thai General System of Transcription (RTGS) defined by the Royal Thai Institute, and the almost identical ISO 11940-2 defined by the International Organization for Standardization, many publications use different romanisation systems. In daily practice, a bewildering variety of romanisations are used, making it difficult to know how to pronounce a word, or to judge if two words (e.g. on a map and a street sign) are actually the same. For more precise information, an equivalent from the International Phonetic Alphabet (IPA) is given as well.

==== Alphabetic ====
Symbol	Name			RTGS		IPA		Class
Symbol	Thai	RTGS	Meaning	Initial	Final	Initial	Final	Class
ก	ก ไก่	ko kai	chicken	k	k	/k/	/k/	mid
ข	ข ไข่	kho khai	egg	kh	k	/kʰ/	/k/	high
ฃ (Note: ฃ kho khuat is obsolete and replaced by ข kho khai, which has identical phonetic values.)	ฃ ขวด	kho khuat	bottle (obsolete)	kh	–	/kʰ/	–	high
ค	ค ควาย	kho khwai	water buffalo	kh	k	/kʰ/	/k/	low
ฅ (Note: ฅ kho khon is obsolete and replaced by ค kho khwai, which has identical phonetic values.)	ฅ คน	kho khon	human, person (obsolete)	kh	–	/kʰ/	–	low
ฆ	ฆ ระฆัง	kho rakhang	bell	kh	k	/kʰ/	/k/	low
ง	ง งู	ngo ngu	snake	ng	ng	/ŋ/	/ŋ/	low
จ	จ จาน	cho chan	plate	ch	t	/tɕ/	/t/	mid
ฉ	ฉ ฉิ่ง	cho ching	ching	ch	–	/tɕʰ/	–	high
ช	ช ช้าง	cho chang	elephant	ch	t	/tɕʰ/	/t/	low
ซ	ซ โซ่	so so	chain	s	t	/s/	/t/	low
ฌ	ฌ เฌอ	cho choe	tree	ch	t	/tɕʰ/	/t/	low
ญ (Note: The lower curves of the letter ญ are removed when certain letters are written below them.)	ญ หญิง	yo ying	woman	y	n	/j/	/n/	low
ฎ	ฎ ชฎา	do chada	makuṭa	d	t	/d/	/t/	mid
ฏ	ฏ ปฏัก	to patak	goad, javelin, spear	t	t	/t/	/t/	mid
ฐ (Note: The lower curves of the letter ฐ are removed when certain letters are written below them.)	ฐ ฐาน	tho than	pedestal	th	t	/tʰ/	/t/	high
ฑ	ฑ มณโฑ	tho montho	Montho	th or d	t	/tʰ/ or /d/	/t/	low
ฒ	ฒ ผู้เฒ่า	tho phu thao	elder	th	t	/tʰ/	/t/	low
ณ	ณ เณร	no nen	samanera	n	n	/n/	/n/	low
ด	ด เด็ก	do dek	child	d	t	/d/	/t/	mid
ต	ต เต่า	to tao	turtle	t	t	/t/	/t/	mid
ถ	ถ ถุง	tho thung	sack	th	t	/tʰ/	/t/	high
ท	ท ทหาร	tho thahan	soldier	th	t	/tʰ/	/t/	low
ธ	ธ ธง	tho thong	flag	th	t	/tʰ/	/t/	low
น	น หนู	no nu	mouse, rat	n	n	/n/	/n/	low
บ	บ ใบไม้	bo baimai	leaf	b	p	/b/	/p/	mid
ป	ป ปลา	po pla	fish	p	p	/p/	/p/	mid
ผ	ผ ผึ้ง	pho phueng	bee	ph	–	/pʰ/	–	high
ฝ	ฝ ฝา	fo fa	lid	f	–	/f/	–	high
พ	พ พาน	pho phan	phan	ph	p	/pʰ/	/p/	low
ฟ	ฟ ฟัน	fo fan	tooth	f	p	/f/	/p/	low
ภ	ภ สำเภา	pho samphao	junk	ph	p	/pʰ/	/p/	low
ม	ม ม้า	mo ma	horse	m	m	/m/	/m/	low
ย	ย ยักษ์	yo yak	giant, yaksha	y	– (Note: When ย ends a syllable, it is usually part of the vowel. For example, mai (หมาย, /mǎːj/), muai (หมวย, /mǔaj/), roi (โรย, /rōːj/), and thui (ทุย, /tʰūj/). There are some cases in which ย ends a syllable and is not part of the vowel (but serves as an independent ending consonant). An example is phinyo (ภิยโย, /pʰīn.jōː/).)	/j/	/j/	low
ร	ร เรือ	ro ruea	boat, ship	r	n	/r/	/n/	low
ล	ล ลิง	lo ling	monkey	l	n	/l/	/n/ or /w/	low
ว	ว แหวน	wo waen	ring	w	– (Note: When ว ends a syllable, it is always part of the vowel. For example, hio (หิว, /hǐw/), kao (กาว, /kāːw/), klua (กลัว, /klūa/), and reo (เร็ว, /rēw/).)	/w/	/w/	low
ศ	ศ ศาลา	so sala	pavilion, sala	s	t	/s/	/t/	high
ษ	ษ ฤๅษี	so ruesi	rishi	s	t	/s/	/t/	high
ส	ส เสือ	so suea	tiger, big cat	s	t	/s/	/t/	high
ห	ห หีบ	ho hip	chest, box	h	–	/h/	–	high
ฬ	ฬ จุฬา	lo chula	chula kite	l	n	/l/	/n/	low
อ	อ อ่าง	o ang	basin, tub	– (Note: อ is a special case in that at the beginning of a word it is used as a silent initial for syllables that start with a vowel (all vowels are written relative to a consonant—see below). The same symbol is used as a vowel in non-initial position.)	–	/ʔ/	–	mid
ฮ	ฮ นกฮูก	ho nok huk	owl	h	–	/h/	–	low

==== Phonetic ====
The consonants can be organised by place and manner of articulation according to principles of the International Phonetic Association. Thai distinguishes among three voice/aspiration patterns for plosive consonants:

- unvoiced, unaspirated
- unvoiced, aspirated
- voiced, unaspirated

Where English has only a distinction between the voiced, unaspirated /b/ and the unvoiced, aspirated /pʰ/, Thai distinguishes a third sound which is neither voiced nor aspirated, which occurs in English only as an allophone of /p/, approximately the sound of the p in "spin". There is similarly a laminal denti-alveolar /t/, /tʰ/, /d/ triplet. In the velar series there is a /k/, /kʰ/ pair and in the postalveolar series the /tɕ/, /tɕʰ/ pair.

In each cell below, the first line indicates International Phonetic Alphabet (IPA), the second indicates the Thai characters in initial position (several letters appearing in the same box have identical pronunciation).

Pronunciation of Thai characters in initial position
Type	Bilabial			Labio- dental	Dental/Alveolar			Alveolo- palatal		Palatal	Velar			Glottal
Nasal			[m] ม				[n] ณ, น						[ŋ] ง	
Plosive	[p] ป	[pʰ] ผ, พ, ภ	[b] บ		[t] ฏ, ต	[tʰ] ฐ, ฑ, ฒ, ถ, ท, ธ	[d] ฎ, ด				[k] ก	[kʰ] ข, ฃ, ค, ฅ, ฆ (Note: ฃ and ฅ are no longer used. Thus, modern Thai is said to have 42 consonants.)		[ʔ] อ (Note: Initial อ is silent and therefore considered as glottal plosive.)
Affricate								[t͡ɕ] จ	[t͡ɕʰ] ฉ, ช, ฌ					
Fricative				[f] ฝ, ฟ	[s] ซ, ศ, ษ, ส									[h] ห, ฮ
Trill							[r] ร							
Approximant			[w] ว							[j] ญ, ย				
Lateral approximant							[l] ล, ฬ							

Notes

Although the overall 44 Thai consonants provide 21 sounds in case of initials, the case for finals is different. The consonant sounds in the table for initials collapse in the table for final sounds. At the end of a syllable, all plosives are unvoiced, unaspirated, and have no audible release. Initial affricates and fricatives become final plosives. The initial trill (ร), approximant (ญ), and lateral approximants (ล, ฬ) are realized as a final nasal /n/.

Only 8 ending consonant sounds, as well as no ending consonant sound, are available in Thai pronunciation. Among these consonants, excluding the disused ฃ and ฅ, six (ฉ, ผ, ฝ, ห, อ, ฮ) have never been attested as a final. The remaining 36 are grouped as following.

Pronunciation of Thai characters in final position
Type	Bilabial		Alveolar		Palatal	Velar		Glottal
Nasal		[m] ม		[n] ณ, น, ญ, ร, ล, ฬ			[ŋ] ง	
Plosive	[p̚] บ, ป, พ, ฟ, ภ		[t̚] จ, ช, ซ, ฌ, ฎ, ฏ, ฐ, ฑ, ฒ, ด, ต, ถ, ท, ธ, ศ, ษ, ส			[k̚] ก, ข, ค, ฆ		[ʔ] (ะ) (Note: The glottal plosive appears at the end when no final follows a short vowel.)
Approximant		[w] ว			[j] ย			

=== Vowels ===
Thai vowel sounds and diphthongs are written using a mixture of vowel symbols on a consonant base. Each vowel is shown in its correct position relative to a base consonant and sometimes a final consonant as well. Vowels can go above, below, left of or right of the consonant, or combinations of these places. If a vowel has parts before and after the initial consonant, and the syllable starts with a consonant cluster, the split will go around the whole cluster.

Twenty-one vowel symbol elements are traditionally named, which may appear alone or in combination to form compound symbols.

Symbol	Name		Combinations
Symbol	Thai	RTGS	Combinations
ะ	วิสรรชนีย์, นมนาง	wisanchani, nom nang (from Sanskrit visarjanīya)	◌ะ; ◌ัวะ; เ◌ะ; เ◌อะ; เ◌าะ; เ◌ียะ; เ◌ือะ; แ◌ะ; โ◌ะ
◌ั	ไม้หันอากาศ, ไม้ผัด, หางกังหัน	mai han akat, mai phat, mai kanghan	◌ั◌; ◌ัว; ◌ัวะ
◌็	ไม้ไต่คู้	mai tai khu	◌็; ◌็อ◌; เ◌็◌; แ◌็◌
า	ลากข้าง	lak khang	◌า; ◌า◌; ◌ํา; เ◌า; เ◌าะ
◌ิ	พินทุ์อิ, พินทุอิ	phin i, phinthu i	◌ิ; เ◌ิ◌; ◌ี; ◌ี◌; เ◌ีย; เ◌ียะ; ◌ื◌; ◌ือ; เ◌ือ; เ◌ือะ
◌̍	ฝนทอง	fon thong (Note: These symbols are always combined with phinthu i (◌ิ).)	◌ี; ◌ี◌; เ◌ีย; เ◌ียะ
◌̎	ฟันหนู, มูสิกทันต์	fan nu, musikathan	◌ื◌; ◌ือ; เ◌ือ; เ◌ือะ
◌ํ	นิคหิต, นฤคหิต, หยาดน้ำค้าง	nikkhahit, naruekhahit, yat namkhang	◌ึ; ◌ึ◌; ◌ํา
◌ุ	ตีนเหยียด, ลากตีน	tin yiat, lak tin	◌ุ; ◌ุ◌
◌ู	ตีนคู้	tin khu	◌ู; ◌ู◌
เ	ไม้หน้า	mai na	เ◌; เ◌◌; เ◌็◌; เ◌อ; เ◌อ◌; เ◌อะ; เ◌า; เ◌าะ; เ◌ิ◌; เ◌ีย; เ◌ีย◌; เ◌ียะ; เ◌ือ; เ◌ือ◌; เ◌ือะ; แ◌; แ◌◌; แ◌็◌; แ◌ะ
โ	ไม้โอ	mai o	โ◌; โ◌◌; โ◌ะ
ใ	ไม้ม้วน	mai muan	ใ◌
ไ	ไม้มลาย	mai malai	ไ◌
อ	ตัว อ	tua o	◌อ; ◌็อ◌; ◌ือ; เ◌อ; เ◌อ◌; เ◌อะ; เ◌ือ; เ◌ือะ
ย	ตัว ย	tua yo	เ◌ีย; เ◌ีย◌; เ◌ียะ
ว	ตัว ว	tua wo	◌ัว; ◌ัวะ
ฤ	ตัว ฤ	tua rue	ฤ
ฤๅ	ตัว ฤๅ	tua rue	ฤๅ
ฦ	ตัว ฦ	tua lue	ฦ
ฦๅ	ตัว ฦๅ	tua lue	ฦๅ

Notes

The inherent vowels are /a/ in open syllables (CV) and /o/ in closed syllables (CVC). For example, ถนน transcribes /tʰànǒn/ "road". There are a few exceptions in Pali loanwords, where the inherent vowel of an open syllable is /ɔː/. The circumfix vowels, such as เ–าะ /ɔʔ/, encompass a preceding consonant with an inherent vowel. For example, /pʰɔʔ/ is written เพาะ, and /tɕʰapʰɔʔ/ "only" is written เฉพาะ.

The characters ฤ ฤๅ (plus ฦ ฦๅ, which are obsolete) are usually considered as vowels, the first being a short vowel sound, and the latter, long. The letters are based on vocalic consonants used in Sanskrit, given the one-to-one letter correspondence of Thai to Sanskrit, although the last two letters are quite rare, as their equivalent Sanskrit sounds only occur in a few, ancient words and thus are functionally obsolete in Thai. The first symbol 'ฤ' is common in many Sanskrit and Pali words and 'ฤๅ' less so, but does occur as the primary spelling for the Thai adaptation of Sanskrit 'rishi' and treu (Thai: ตฤๅ /trɯ̄ː/ or /trīː/), a very rare Khmer loan word for 'fish' only found in ancient poetry. As alphabetical entries, ฤ ฤๅ follow ร, and themselves can be read as a combination of consonant and vowel, equivalent to รึ (short), and รือ (long) (and the obsolete pair as ลึ, ลือ), respectively. Moreover, ฤ can act as ริ as an integral part in many words mostly borrowed from Sanskrit such as กฤษณะ (kritsana, not kruetsana), ฤทธิ์ (rit, not ruet), and กฤษดา (kritsada, not kruetsada), for example. It is also used to spell อังกฤษ angkrit England/English. The word ฤกษ์ (roek) is a unique case where ฤ is pronounced like เรอ. In the past, prior to the turn of the twentieth century, it was common for writers to substitute these letters in native vocabulary that contained similar sounds as a shorthand that was acceptable in writing at the time. For example, the conjunction 'or' (Thai: หรือ /rɯ̌ː/ rue, cf. Lao: ຫຼຶ/ຫລື /lɯ̌ː/ lu) was often written Thai: ฤ. This practice has become obsolete, but can still be seen in Thai literature.

The pronunciation below is indicated by the International Phonetic Alphabet and the Romanisation according to the Royal Thai Institute as well as several variant Romanisations often encountered. A very approximate equivalent is given for various regions of English speakers and surrounding areas. Dotted circles represent the positions of consonants or consonant clusters. The first one represents the initial consonant and the latter (if it exists) represents the final.

Ro han (ร หัน) is not usually considered a vowel and is not included in the following table. It represents the sara a /a/ vowel in certain Sanskrit loanwords and appears as ◌รร◌. When used without a final consonant (◌รร), /n/ is implied as the final consonant, giving /an/.

Short vowels					Long vowels				
Symbol	IPA	Romanization		Similar Sound (English RP pronunciation)	Symbol	IPA	Romanization		Similar Sound (English RP pronunciation)
Symbol	IPA	RTGS	Variants	Similar Sound (English RP pronunciation)	Symbol	IPA	RTGS	Variants	Similar Sound (English RP pronunciation)
Simple vowels
◌ะ ◌ ◌ั◌	/aʔ/, /a/	a	u	u in "nut"	◌า ◌า◌	/aː/	a	ah, ar, aa	a in "father"
◌ิ ◌ิ◌	/iʔ/, /i/	i		y in "greedy"	◌ี ◌ี◌	/iː/	i	ee, ii, y	ee in "see"
◌ึ ◌ึ◌	/ɯʔ/, /ɯ/	ue	eu, u, uh	Can be approximated by pronouncing the oo in "look" with unrounded lips	◌ือ ◌ื◌	/ɯː/	ue	eu, u	Can be approximated by pronouncing the oo in RP "goose" with unrounded lips
◌ุ ◌ุ◌	/uʔ/, /u/	u	oo	oo in "shoot"	◌ู ◌ู◌	/uː/	u	oo, uu	oo in "too"
เ◌ะ เ◌็◌	/eʔ/, /e/	e		e in "neck"	เ◌ เ◌◌	/eː/	e	ay, a, ae, ai, ei	a in "lame"
แ◌ะ แ◌็◌	/ɛʔ/, /ɛ/	ae	aeh, a	a in "at"	แ◌ แ◌◌	/ɛː/	ae	a	a in "ham"
โ◌ะ ◌◌	/oʔ/, /o/	o		oa in "boat"	โ◌ โ◌◌	/oː/	o	or, oh, ô	o in "go"
เ◌าะ ◌็อ◌	/ɔʔ/, /ɔ/	o	aw	o in "not"	◌อ ◌อ◌ ◌◌ (Note: Only with ร (ro ruea) as final consonant, appearing as ◌ร /ɔːn/.) ◌็ (Note: Only with the word ก็ /kɔ̂ʔ/, /kɔ̂ː/.)	/ɔː/	o	or, aw	aw in "saw"
เ◌อะ	/ɤʔ/	oe	eu	e in "the"	เ◌อ เ◌ิ◌ เ◌อ◌ (Note: Used only in certain words.)	/ɤː/ /ɤ/	oe	er, eu, ur	u in "burn"
Diphthongs
เ◌ียะ	/iaʔ/	ia	iah, ear, ie	ea in "ear" with glottal stop	เ◌ีย เ◌ีย◌	/ia/	ia	ear, ere, ie	ear in "ear"
เ◌ือะ	/ɯaʔ/	uea	eua, ua	ure in "pure"	เ◌ือ เ◌ือ◌	/ɯa/	uea	eua, ua, ue	ure in "pure"
◌ัวะ	/uaʔ/	ua		ewe in "sewer"	◌ัว ◌ว◌	/ua/	ua	uar	ewe in "newer"
Phonemic diphthongs (Note: Traditionally, these sets of diphthongs and triphthongs are regarded as combinations of regular vowels or diphthongs with wo waen (ว, /w/) or yo yak (ย, /j/) as the final consonant, and are not counted among the thirty-two vowels.)
◌ิว	/iw/	io	iu, ew	ew in "few"					
เ◌็ว	/ew/	eo	eu, ew		เ◌ว	/eːw/	eo	eu, ew	ai + ow in "rainbow"
					แ◌ว	/ɛːw/	aeo	aew, eo	a in "ham" + ow in "low"
เ◌า (Note: sara ai (ใ◌ and ไ◌) and sara ao (เ◌า) are also considered extra vowels.)	/aw/	ao	aw, au, ow	ow in "cow"	◌าว	/aːw/	ao	au	ow in "now"
					เ◌ียว	/iaw/	iao	eaw, iew, iow	io in "trio"
◌ัย	/aj/	ai	ay	i in "hi"	◌าย	/aːj/	ai	aai, aay, ay	ye in "bye"
ใ◌, ไ◌ (Note: Mai malai (ไ◌) is used for the /aj/ vowel in most words, while mai muan (ใ◌) is only used in twenty specific words.) ไ◌ย (Note: ไ◌ย is found in ไทย Thai and in Pali loanwords which contain -eyya. The ย is redundant, but may be pronounced in a compound word when joined by samāsa.)	/aj/	ai	ay	i in "hi"	◌าย	/aːj/	ai	aai, aay, ay	ye in "bye"
◌็อย	/ɔj/	oi	oy		◌อย	/ɔːj/	oi	oy	oy in "boy"
					โ◌ย	/oːj/	oi	oy	
◌ุย	/uj/	ui	uy						
					เ◌ย	/ɤːj/	oei	oey	u in "burn" + y in "boy"
					◌วย	/uaj/	uai	uay	uoy in "buoy"
					เ◌ือย	/ɯaj/	ueai	uai	
Extra vowels (Note: Extra vowels are not distinct vowel sounds, but are symbols that represent certain vowel-consonant combinations. They are traditionally regarded as vowels, although some sources do not.)
◌ำ	/am/	am	um	um in "sum"					
ฤ	/rɯ/ /ri/ /rɤː/	rue, ri, roe	ru, ri	rew in "grew", ry in "angry"	ฤๅ	/rɯː/	rue	ruu	
ฦ	/lɯ/	lue	lu, li	lew in "blew"	ฦๅ	/lɯː/	lue	lu	

=== Tone ===
==== Central Thai ====
Central Thai is a tonal language, and the script gives full information on the tones. Tones are realised in the vowels, but indicated in the script by a combination of the class of the initial consonant (high, mid or low), vowel length (long or short), closing consonant (plosive or sonorant, called dead or live) and, if present, one of four tone marks, whose names derive from the names of the digits 1–4 borrowed from Pali or Sanskrit. The rules for denoting tones are shown in the following chart:

Syllable type: live (unfilled shape), dead (filled shape), dead short (narrow ellipse), dead long (wide ellipse).

Symbol	Name		Syllable composition and initial consonant class			
Symbol	Thai	RTGS	Vowel and final	Low	Mid	High
	(ไม่มี)	(none)	live long vowel or vowel plus sonorant	middle	middle	rising
	(ไม่มี)	(none)	dead short short vowel at end or plus plosive	high	low	low
	(ไม่มี)	(none)	dead long long vowel plus plosive	falling	low	low
่	ไม้เอก	mai ek	any	falling	low	low
้	ไม้โท	mai tho	any	high	falling	falling
๊	ไม้ตรี	mai tri	any	-	high	-
๋	ไม้จัตวา	mai chattawa	any	-	rising	-

Thai language tone chart

Flowchart for determining the tone of a Thai syllable. Click to enlarge

The five phonemic tones of Standard Thai pronounced with the syllable '/naː/':

"None", that is, no tone marker, is used with the base accent (พื้นเสียง, phuen siang). Mai tri and mai chattawa are only used with mid-class consonants.

Two consonant characters (not diacritics) are used to modify the tone:

- ห นำ ho nam, leading ho. A silent, high-class ห "leads" low-class nasal stops (ง, ญ, น and ม) and non-plosives (ว, ย, ร and ล), which have no corresponding high-class phonetic match, into the tone properties of a high-class consonant. In polysyllabic words, an initial mid- or high-class consonant with an implicit vowel similarly "leads" these same low-class consonants into the higher class tone rules, with the tone marker borne by the low-class consonant.
- อ นำ o nam, leading o. In four words only, a silent, mid-class อ "leads" low-class ย into mid-class tone rules: อย่า (ya, don't) อยาก (yak, desire) อย่าง (yang, kind, sort, type) อยู่ (yu, stay). All four have long-vowel, low-tone siang ek; อยาก, a dead syllable, needs no tone marker, but the three live syllables all take mai ek.

Low consonant	High consonant	IPA
ง	หง	/ŋ/
ญ	หญ	/j/
น	หน	/n/
ม	หม	/m/
ย	หย	/j/
ร	หร	/r/
ล	หล	/l/
ว	หว	/w/
Low consonant	Middle consonant	IPA
ย	อย	/j/

In some dialects there are words which are spelled with one tone but pronounced with another and often occur in informal conversation (notably the pronouns ฉัน chan and เขา khao, which are both pronounced with a high tone rather than the rising tone indicated by the script). Generally, when such words are recited or read in public, they are pronounced as spelled.

==== Southern Thai ====
Although the Southern Thai writing form also gives full information on the tones as does Central Thai, the language itself is a pitch-accent language, whose spoken form can have up to seven tones. When Southern Thai is written in Thai script, there are different rules for indicating spoken tone.

Tones	Nakhon Si Thammarat accent rules	IPA
First tone	An initial consonant class "high" with long sound, and an initial consonant class "low" after the word.	[˦˥˧]
First tone	An initial consonant class "high" with short sound, and an initial consonant class "low" with [k̚], [t̚], [p̚] finals after the word.	[˨˦]
Second tone	An initial consonant class "high" both short long sound, and an initial consonant class "low" after the word.	[˦]
Third tone	An initial consonant class "middle" long sound.	[˧˦˧]
Third tone	An initial consonant class "middle" short sound with [k̚], [t̚], [p̚] finals.	[˧˦]
Fourth tone	An initial consonant class "middle" both short long sound.	[˧]
Fifth tone	An initial consonant class "low" with head word.	[˨˧˨]
Sixth tone	An initial consonant class "low" long sound.	[˨˦]
Seventh tone	An initial consonant class "low" short sound.	[˨˩]

=== Diacritics ===
Other diacritics are used to indicate short vowels and silent letters:

- Mai taikhu means "climbing stick". It is a miniature Thai numeral 8 ๘. Mai taikhu is often used with sara e (เ) and sara ae (แ) in closed syllables.
- Thanthakhat means "capital punishment". It is a miniature Thai numeral 4 ๔.

Symbol	Name		Meaning
Symbol	Thai	RTGS	Meaning
◌็	ไม้ไต่คู้	mai tai khu	shortens vowel
◌์	ทัณฑฆาต or การันต์	thanthakhat or karan	indicates silent letter

Fan nu means "rat teeth" and is thought as being placed in combination with short sara i and fong man to form other characters.

Symbol	Name		Use
Symbol	Thai	RTGS	Use
"	ฟันหนู	fan nu	combined with short sara i (◌ิ) to make long sara ue (◌ื)
"	ฟันหนู	fan nu	combined with fong man (๏) to make fong man fan nu (๏")

=== Numerals ===
For numerals, mostly the standard Hindu-Arabic numerals (Thai: เลขฮินดูอารบิก, lek hindu arabik) are used, but Thai also has its own set of Thai numerals that are based on the Hindu-Arabic numeral system (Thai: เลขไทย, lek thai), which are mostly limited to government documents, election posters, license plates of military vehicles, and special entry prices for Thai nationals.

Hindu-Arabic	0	1	2	3	4	5	6	7	8	9
Thai	๐	๑	๒	๓	๔	๕	๖	๗	๘	๙

=== Other symbols ===
Symbol	Name		Meaning
Symbol	Thai	RTGS	Meaning
ฯ	ไปยาลน้อย	paiyan noi	marks formal phrase shortened by convention (abbreviation)
ฯลฯ	ไปยาลใหญ่	paiyan yai	et cetera
ๆ	ไม้ยมก	mai yamok	preceding word or phrase is reduplicated
๏	ฟองมัน, ตาไก่	fong man, ta kai	previously marked beginning of a sentence, paragraph, or stanza (obsolete); now only marks beginning of a stanza in a poem; now also used as bullet point
๏"	ฟองมันฟันหนู, ฟันหนูฟองมัน, ฝนทองฟองมัน	fong man fan nu, fan nu fong man, fon tong fong man	previously marked beginning of a chapter (obsolete)
๐"	ฟองดัน	fong dan	previously marked beginning of a chapter (obsolete)
ฯ	อังคั่นเดี่ยว, คั่นเดี่ยว, ขั้นเดี่ยว	angkhan diao, khan diao, khan diao	previously marked end of a sentence or stanza (obsolete)
๚	อังคั่นคู่, คั่นคู่, ขั้นคู่	angkhan khu, khan khu, khan khu	marks end of stanza; marks end of chapter or long section
ฯะ	อังคั่นวิสรรชนีย์	angkhan wisanchani	marks end of a stanza in a poem
๚ะ	อังคั่นวิสรรชนีย์	angkhan wisanchani	marks end of a stanza in a poem
๛	โคมูตร, สูตรนารายณ์	kho mut, sut narai	marks end of a chapter or document; marks end of a story
๚ะ๛	อังคั่นวิสรรชนีย์โคมูตร	angkhan wisanchani kho mut	marks the very end of a written work
฿	บาท	bat	baht (the currency of Thailand)

Pai-yan noi and angkhan diao share the same character. Sara a (–ะ) used in combination with other characters is called wisanchani.

Some of the characters can mark the beginning or end of a sentence, chapter, or episode of a story or of a stanza in a poem. These have changed use over time and are becoming uncommon.

== Summary charts ==
Initial consonants
	**ก** [k]	**ข** [kʰ]	ฃ [kʰ]	**ค** [kʰ]	ฅ [kʰ]	ฆ [kʰ]	**ง** [ŋ]	หง [ŋ]			
	**จ** [t͡ɕ]	**ฉ** [t͡ɕʰ]		**ช** [t͡ɕʰ]	**ซ** [s]	ฌ [t͡ɕʰ]	ญ [j]	หญ [j]	หย [j]	**ย** [j]	ศ [s]
ฎ [d]	ฏ [t]	ฐ [tʰ]		ฑ [tʰ]/[d]		ฒ [tʰ]	ณ [n]		หร [r]	**ร** [r]	ษ [s]
**ด** [d]	**ต** [t]	**ถ** [tʰ]		**ท** [tʰ]		ธ [tʰ]	**น** [n]	หน [n]	หล [l]	**ล** [l]	**ส** [s]
**บ** [b]	**ป** [p]	**ผ** [pʰ]	**ฝ** [f]	**พ** [pʰ]	**ฟ** [f]	ภ [pʰ]	**ม** [m]	หม [m]	หว [w]	**ว** [w]	**ห** [h]
**อ** [ʔ]					**ฮ** [h]					ฬ [l]	

Colour codes
Colour	Class
Green	Mid (including อย [j])
Red	High
Blue	Paired low class; has its high class counterpart
Purple	Single low class; turns into high class if preceded by ห
**Bold**	Default letters for Standard Thai phonology

Final consonants
	**ก** [k̚]	ข [k̚]	ฃ ∅	ค [k̚]	ฅ ∅	ฆ [k̚]	**ง** [ŋ]		
	จ [t̚]	ฉ ∅		ช [t̚]	ซ [t̚]	ฌ [t̚]	ญ [n]	**ย** [j]	ศ [t̚]
ฎ [t̚]	ฏ [t̚]	ฐ [t̚]		ฑ [t̚]		ฒ [t̚]	ณ [n]	ร [n]	ษ [t̚]
**ด** [t̚]	ต [t̚]	ถ [t̚]		ท [t̚]		ธ [t̚]	**น** [n]	ล [n]/[w]	ส [t̚]
**บ** [p̚]	ป [p̚]	ผ ∅	ฝ ∅	พ [p̚]	ฟ [p̚]	ภ [p̚]	**ม** [m]	**ว** [w]	ห ∅
อ ∅					ฮ ∅			ฬ [n]	

Colour codes
Colour	Meaning
Orange	Live syllable (Sonorant)
Yellow	Dead syllable (Obstruent)
Grey	Does not occur as a final consonant
**Bold**	Default letters for Standard Thai phonology

Short vowels
Front		Central		Back	
No final consonant	With final consonant	No final consonant	With final consonant	No final consonant	With final consonant
◌ิ [iʔ]	◌ิ◌ [i]	◌ึ [ɯʔ]	◌ึ◌ [ɯ]	◌ุ [uʔ]	◌ุ◌ [u]
เ◌ะ [eʔ]	เ◌็◌ [e]	เ◌อะ [ɤʔ]	∅	โ◌ะ [oʔ]	◌◌ [o]
แ◌ะ [ɛʔ]	แ◌็◌ [ɛ]	◌/◌ะ [aʔ]	◌ั◌ [a]	เ◌าะ [ɔʔ]	◌็อ◌ [ɔ]
เ◌ียะ [iaʔ]	∅	เ◌ือะ [ɯaʔ]	∅	◌ัวะ [uaʔ]	∅

Long vowels
Front		Central		Back	
No final consonant	With final consonant	No final consonant	With final consonant	No final consonant	With final consonant
◌ี [iː]	◌ี◌ [iː]	◌ือ [ɯː]	◌ื◌ [ɯː]	◌ู [uː]	◌ู◌ [uː]
เ◌ [eː]	เ◌◌ [eː]	เ◌อ [ɤː]	เ◌ิ◌ [ɤ(ː)]	โ◌ [oː]	โ◌◌ [oː]
แ◌ [ɛː]	แ◌◌ [ɛː]	◌า [aː]	◌า◌ [aː]	◌อ [ɔː]	◌อ◌ [ɔː]
เ◌ีย [ia]	เ◌ีย◌ [ia]	เ◌ือ [ɯa]	เ◌ือ◌ [ɯa]	◌ัว [ua]	◌ว◌ [ua]

Additional sounds
Symbol	IPA	Equivalent	Note
◌ำ	[am]	◌ัม	
ใ◌	[aj]	◌ัย	Used only in twenty specific words
ไ◌	[aj]	◌ัย	
ไ◌ย	[aj]	◌ัย	Used only in certain words
เ◌า	[aw]	–	
เ◌ย	[ɤːj]	–	
เ◌อ◌	[ɤː]	เ◌ิ◌	Used only in certain words
◌ร	[ɔːn]	◌อน	
◌รร	[an]	◌ัน	
◌รร◌	[a]	◌ั◌	
ฤ	[rɯ]	รึ	
◌ฤ(◌)	[rɯ]	◌รึ(◌)	Preceded by ค, พ, น, ม, ห
◌ฤ(◌)	[ri]	◌ริ(◌)	Preceded by ก, ต, ท, ป, ศ, ส
ฤ◌	[ri]	ริ◌	
ฤ◌	[rɤː]	เริ◌	Only with the word ฤกษ์ [rɤ̂ːk̚]
ฤๅ	[rɯː]	รือ	
ฦ	[lɯ]	ลึ	Obsolete
ฦๅ	[lɯː]	ลือ	Obsolete
◌์	–		Indicates silent letter(s)

Tone chart
Class	Ending	0 Mid tone	1 Low tone	2 Falling tone	3 High tone	4 Rising tone
Mid	Live	◌	◌่	◌้	◌๊	◌๋
Mid	Dead		◌	◌้	◌๊	◌๋
High	Live		◌่	◌้		◌
High	Dead		◌	◌้		
Low	Live	◌		◌่	◌้	
Low	Dead (short vowel)			◌่	◌	◌๋
Low	Dead (long vowel)			◌	◌้	◌๋

Examples: 5 tones for live syllable and 4 tones for dead syllable
0 Mid tone	1 Low tone	2 Falling tone		3 High tone	4 Rising tone
อา	อ่า	อ้า		อ๊า	อ๋า
[ʔāː]	[ʔàː]	[ʔâː]		[ʔáː]	[ʔǎː]
	กาบ	ก้าบ		ก๊าบ	ก๋าบ
	[kàːp̚]	[kâːp̚]		[káːp̚]	[kǎːp̚]
คา	ข่า	ค่า	ข้า	ค้า	ขา
[kʰāː]	[kʰàː]	[kʰâː]		[kʰáː]	[kʰǎː]
นา	หน่า	น่า	หน้า	น้า	หนา
[nāː]	[nàː]	[nâː]		[náː]	[nǎː]

== Sanskrit and Pali ==
The Thai script (like all Indic scripts) uses a number of modifications to write Sanskrit and related languages (in particular, Pali). Pali is very closely related to Sanskrit and is the liturgical language of Thai Buddhism. In Thailand, Pali is written and studied using a slightly modified Thai script. The main difference is that each consonant is followed by an implied short a (อะ), not the 'o', or 'ə' of Thai: this short a is never omitted in pronunciation, and if the vowel is not to be pronounced, then a specific symbol must be used, the pinthu อฺ (a solid dot under the consonant). This means that sara a (อะ) is never used when writing Pali, because it is always implied. For example, namo is written นะโม in Thai, but in Pali it is written as นโม, because the อะ is redundant. The Sanskrit word 'mantra' is written มนตร์ in Thai (and therefore pronounced mon), but is written มนฺตฺร in Sanskrit (and therefore pronounced mantra). When writing Pali, only 33 consonants and 12 vowels are used.

This is an example of a Pali text written using the Thai Sanskrit orthography: อรหํ สมฺมาสมฺพุทฺโธ ภควา [arahaṃ sammāsambuddho bhagavā]. Written in modern Thai orthography, this becomes อะระหัง สัมมาสัมพุทโธ ภะคะวา arahang sammasamphuttho phakhawa.

In Thailand, Sanskrit is read out using the Thai values for all the consonants (so ค is read as kha and not [ga]), which makes Thai spoken Sanskrit incomprehensible to sanskritists not trained in Thailand. The Sanskrit values are used in transliteration (without the diacritics), but these values are never actually used when Sanskrit is read out loud in Thailand. The vowels used in Thai are identical to Sanskrit, with the exception of ฤ, ฤๅ, ฦ, and ฦๅ, which are read using their Thai values, not their Sanskrit values. Sanskrit and Pali are not tonal languages, but in Thailand, the Thai tones are used when reading these languages out loud.

In the tables of this section, the Thai value (transliterated according to the Royal Thai system) of each letter is listed first, followed by the IAST value of each letter in square brackets. The IAST values are never used in pronunciation, but sometimes in transcriptions (with the diacritics omitted). This disjoint between transcription and spoken value explains the romanisation for Sanskrit names in Thailand that many foreigners find confusing. For example, สุวรรณภูมิ is romanised as Suvarnabhumi, but pronounced su-wan-na-phum. ศรีนครินทร์ is romanised as Srinagarindra but pronounced si-nakha-rin.

=== Plosives (vargaḥ) ===
Plosives (also called stops) are listed in their traditional Sanskrit order, which corresponds to Thai alphabetical order from ก to ม with three exceptions: in Thai, high-class ข is followed by two obsolete characters with no Sanskrit equivalent, high-class ฃ and low-class ฅ; low-class ช is followed by sibilant ซ (low-class equivalent of high-class sibilant ส that follows ศ and ษ.) The table gives the Thai value first, and then the IAST (International Alphabet of Sanskrit Transliteration) value.

Class	Sanskrit unvoiced				Sanskrit voiced					
Class	Thai unvoiced								Thai voiced	
Class	Unaspirated		Aspirated		Aspirated	Unaspirated	Aspirated		Nasal	
Class	Thai	Sanskrit	Thai	Sanskrit	Thai	Sanskrit	Thai	Sanskrit	Thai	Sanskrit
velar	ก kà IPA: /k/	क ka IPA: /k/	ข khà IPA: /kʰ/	ख kha IPA: /kʰ/	ค khá IPA: /kʰ/	ग ga IPA: /g/	ฆ khá IPA: /kʰ/	घ gha IPA: /gʱ/	ง ngá IPA: /ŋ/	ङ ṅa IPA: /ŋ/
palatal	จ cà IPA: /t͡ɕ/	च ca IPA: /c/, /tɕ/	ฉ chà IPA: /t͡ɕʰ/	छ cha IPA: /cʰ/, /tɕʰ/	ช chá IPA: /t͡ɕʰ/	ज ja IPA: /ɟ/, /d͡ʑ/	ฌ chá IPA: /t͡ɕʰ/	झ jha IPA: /ɟʱ/, /d͡ʑʱ/	ญ yá IPA: /j/	ञ ña IPA: /ɲ/
retroflex	ฏ tà IPA: /t/	ट ṭa IPA: /ʈ/	ฐ thà IPA: /tʰ/	ठ ṭha IPA: /ʈʰ/	ฑ thá IPA: /tʰ/, /d/	ड ḍa IPA: /ɖ/	ฒ thá IPA: /tʰ/	ढ ḍha IPA: /ɖʱ/	ณ ná IPA: /n/	ण ṇa IPA: /ɳ/
dental	ต tà IPA: /t/	त ta IPA: /t/	ถ thà IPA: /tʰ/	थ tha IPA: /tʰ/	ท thá IPA: /tʰ/	द da IPA: /d/	ธ thá IPA: /tʰ/	ध dha IPA: /dʱ/	น ná IPA: /n/	न na IPA: /n/
labial	ป pà IPA: /p/	प pa IPA: /p/	ผ phà IPA: /pʰ/	फ pha IPA: /pʰ/	พ phá IPA: /pʰ/	ब ba IPA: /b/	ภ phá IPA: /pʰ/	भ bha IPA: /bʱ/	ม má IPA: /m/	म ma IPA: /m/
tone class	Mid		High		Low		Low		Low	

None of the Sanskrit plosives are pronounced as the Thai voiced plosives (บ, ด), so these are not represented in the table. While letters are listed here according to their class in Sanskrit, Thai does not distinguish between many of the Sanskrit consonants. So, while there is a clear distinction between ช (/ɟ/, /d͡ʑ/) and ฌ (/ɟʱ/, /d͡ʑʱ/) in Sanskrit, in Thai these two consonants are pronounced identically (including tone) as /t͡ɕʰ/. Likewise, the Thai phonemes do not differentiate between the retroflex and dental classes, since Thai has no retroflex consonants. The equivalents of all the retroflex consonants are pronounced identically to their dental counterparts: thus ฏ is pronounced like ต (/t/), ฐ is pronounced like ถ (high-class /tʰ/), ฑ is pronounced like ท (low-class /tʰ/), ฒ is pronounced like ธ (low-class /tʰ/), and ณ is pronounced like น (/n/).

The Sanskrit unaspirated unvoiced plosives are pronounced as unaspirated unvoiced, whereas Sanskrit aspirated voiced plosives are pronounced as aspirated unvoiced.

=== Non-plosives (avargaḥ) ===
Semivowels (กึ่งสระ kueng sara) and liquids come in Thai alphabetical order after ม, the last of the plosives. The term อวรรค awak means "without a break"; that is, without a plosive.

Series	Thai	Devanagari	Related vowels
palatal	ย yá IPA: /j/	य ya IPA: /j/	อิ and อี
retroflex	ร rá IPA: /r/	र ra IPA: /ɽ/	ฤ and ฤๅ
dental	ล lá IPA: /l/	ल la IPA: /l/	ฦ and ฦๅ
labial	ว wá IPA: /w/	व va IPA: /ʋ/	อุ and อู

==== Sibilants ====
Inserted sounds (เสียดแทรก siat saek) follow the semi-vowel ว in alphabetical order.

Series	Thai	Devanagari
palatal	ศ sà IPA: /s/	श śa IPA: /ɕ/
retroflex	ษ sà IPA: /s/	ष ṣa IPA: /ʂ/
dental	ส sà IPA: /s/	स sa IPA: /s/

Like Sanskrit, Thai has no voiced sibilant (so no 'z' or 'zh'). In modern Thai, the distinction between the three high-class consonants has been lost and all three are pronounced 'sà'; however, foreign words with a sh-sound may still be transcribed as if the Sanskrit values still hold (e.g., ang-grit อังกฤษ for English instead of อังกฤส).

ศ ศาลา (so sala)
Leads words, as in its example word, ศาลา. The digraph ศรี (Indic sri) is regularly pronounced สี (si), as in Sisaket Province, Thai: ศรีสะเกษ.
ษ ฤๅษี (so rue-si)
May only lead syllables within a word, as in its example, ฤๅษี, or to end a syllable as in ศรีสะเกษ Sisaket and อังกฤษ Angkrit English.
ส เสือ (so suea)
Spells native Thai words that require a high-class /s/, as well as naturalized Pali/Sanskrit words, such as สารท (สาท) in Thetsakan Sat: เทศกาลสารท (เทด-สะ-กาน-สาท), formerly ศารท (สาท).
ซ โซ่ (so so)
Which follows the similar-appearing ช in Thai alphabetical order, spells words requiring a low-class /s/, as does ทร + vowel.
ทร
When accompanied by a vowel (implicit in ทรง (ซง song an element in forming words used with royalty); a semivowel in ทรวง (ซวง suang chest, heart); or explicit in ทราย (ซาย sai sand)). Also as in the heading of this section, เสียดแทรก (pronounced เสียดแซก siat saek). Exceptions to ทร + vowel = /s/ are the prefix โทร- (equivalent to tele- far, pronounced โทระ to-ra), and phonetic re-spellings of English tr- (as in the phonetic respelling of trumpet: ทรัมเพ็ท.) ทร is otherwise pronounced as two syllables ทอระ-, as in ทรมาน (ทอระมาน to-ra-man to torment).

==== Voiced h ====
Thai	Devanagari
ห hà IPA: /h/	ह ha IPA: /ɦ/

ห, a high-class consonant, comes next in alphabetical order, but its low-class equivalent, ฮ, follows similar-appearing อ as the last letter of the Thai alphabet. Like modern Hindi, the voicing has disappeared, and the letter is now pronounced like English 'h'. Like Sanskrit, this letter may only be used to start a syllable, but may not end it. (A popular beer is romanized as Singha, but in Thai is สิงห์, with a karan on the ห; correct pronunciation is "sing", but foreigners to Thailand typically say "sing-ha".)

==== Retroflex lla ====
Thai	Devanagari
ฬ llá IPA: /l/	ळ ḷa IPA: /ɭ/

This represents the retroflex liquid of Pali and Vedic Sanskrit, which does not exist in Classical Sanskrit.

=== Vowels ===
symbol	value
อ	a
อา	ā
อิ	i
อี	ī
อุ	u
อู	ū
เอ	e
ไอ	ai
โอ	o
เอา	au
ฤ	ṛ
ฤๅ	ṝ
ฦ	ḷ
ฦๅ	ḹ

All consonants have an inherent 'a' sound, and therefore there is no need to use the ะ symbol when writing Sanskrit. The Thai vowels อื, ใอ, and so forth, are not used in Sanskrit. The zero consonant, อ, is unique to the Indic alphabets descended from Khmer. When it occurs in Sanskrit, it is always the zero consonant and never the vowel o [ɔː]. Its use in Sanskrit is therefore to write vowels that cannot be otherwise written alone: e.g., อา or อี. When อ is written on its own, then it is a carrier for the implied vowel, a [a] (equivalent to อะ in Thai).

The vowel sign อำ occurs in Sanskrit, but only as the combination of the pure vowels sara a อา with nikkhahit อํ.

=== Other non-Thai symbols ===
There are a number of additional symbols only used to write Sanskrit or Pali, and not used in writing Thai.

==== Nikkhahit (anusvāra) ====
Symbol	IAST
อํ	ṃ

In Sanskrit, the anusvāra indicates a certain kind of nasal sound. In Thai this is written as an open circle above the consonant, known as nikkhahit (นิคหิต), from Pali niggahīta. Nasalisation does not occur in Thai, therefore, a nasal stop is always substituted: e.g. ตํ taṃ, is pronounced as ตัง tang by Thai Sanskritists. If nikkhahit occurs before a consonant, then Thai uses a nasal stop of the same class: e.g. สํสฺกฤตา [saṃskṛta] is read as สันสกฤตา san-sa-krit-ta (The ส following the nikkhahit is a dental-class consonant, therefore the dental-class nasal stop น is used). For this reason, it has been suggested that in Thai, nikkhahit should be listed as a consonant. Also, traditional Pali grammars describe nikkhahit as a consonant. Nikkhahit นิคหิต occurs as part of the Thai vowels sara am อำ and sara ue อึ.

==== Phinthu (virāma) ====
อฺ

Because the Thai script is an abugida, a symbol (equivalent to virāma in devanagari) needs to be added to indicate that the implied vowel is not to be pronounced. This is the phinthu, which is a solid dot (also called 'Bindu' in Sanskrit) below the consonant.

The phinthu is also used for languages that use the Thai script, such as Urak Lawoiʼ, to transcribe sounds that do not exist in Thai phonology. For example, ยฺ (yo yak with phinthu) is used to transcribe the phoneme [ɟ].

==== Yamakkan ====
อ๎

Yamakkan (ยามักการ) is an obsolete symbol used to mark the beginning of consonant clusters: e.g. พ๎ราห๎มณ phramana [brāhmaṇa]. Without the yamakkan, this word would be pronounced pharahamana [barāhamaṇa] instead. This is a feature unique to the Thai script (other Indic scripts use a combination of ligatures, conjuncts or virāma to convey the same information). The symbol is obsolete because pinthu may be used to achieve the same effect: พฺราหฺมณ.

==== Visarga ====
The means of recording visarga (final voiceless 'h') in Thai has reportedly been lost, although the character ◌ะ which is used to transcribe a short /a/ or to add a glottal stop after a vowel is the closest equivalent and can be seen used as a visarga in some Thai-script Sanskrit text.

== Sukhothai ==
The Thai script is derived from the Sukhothai script.

=== Sukhothai consonant chart ===
	ก *k	ข *kʰ	ฃ *x	ค *ɡ	ฅ *ɣ	ฆ *ɡʱ	ง *ŋ			หง *ʰŋ	
อย *ˀj	จ *c	ฉ *cʰ		ช *ɟ	ซ *z	- ฌ *ɟʱ	ญ *ɲ	ย *j	ศ *ɕ	หญ *ʰɲ	หย *ʰj
ฎ *ˀɖ	ฏ *ʈ	ฐ *ʈʰ		- ฑ *ɖ		- ฒ *ɖʱ	ณ *ɳ	ร *r	ษ *ʂ		หร *ʰr
ด *ˀd	ต *t	ถ *tʰ		ท *d		ธ *dʱ	น *n	ล *l	ส *s	หน *ʰn	หล *ʰl
บ *ˀb	ป *p	ผ *pʰ	ฝ *f	พ *b	ฟ *v	ภ *bʱ	ม *m	ว *w		หม *ʰm	หว *ʰw
อ *ʔ		ห *h		‐ ฮ *ɦ				- ฬ *ɭ			

Colour codes
Colour	Proto-Tai classes			
Green	Glottalized			Voiceless
Yellow	Unaspirated		Plain	Voiceless
Red	Aspirated	Friction	Plain	Voiceless
Purple	Continuant	Friction	Plain	Voiceless
Blue	Voiced			

=== Sukhothai consonant inventory ===
	Bilabial				Labio- dental		Alveolar				Alveolo- palatal			Palatal			Velar			Glottal	
Nasal	[m̊] หม		[m] ม				[n̊] หน		[n] น, ณ		[ɲ̊] หญ		[ɲ] ญ				[ŋ̊] หง		[ŋ] ง		
Plosive	[p] ป	[pʰ] ผ	[b] พ, ภ	[ʔb] บ			[t] ฏ, ต	[tʰ] ฐ, ถ	[d] ท, ธ	[ʔd] ฎ, ด							[k] ก	[kʰ] ข	[g] ค, ฆ	[ʔ] อ	
Affricate											[tɕ] จ	[tɕʰ] ฉ	[dʑ] ช				[x] ฃ		[ɣ] ฅ		
Fricative					[f] ฝ	[v] ฟ	[s] ศ, ษ, ส	[z - ʑ] ซ												[h] ห	[ɦ] ฮ
Trill							[r̊] หร		[r] ร												
Approximant	[ẘ] หว		[w] ว											[j̊] หย	[j] ย	[ʔj] อย					
Lateral approximant							[l̥] หล		[l] ล												

=== Historical Sukhothai pronunciation ===
Letters	IPA	Word in Sukhothai (in Modern Thai script)	Pronunciation in IPA (excluding tone)	Meaning and Definitions
วรรค ก | Varga Kor
ก	k	เกิด	kɤːt	v. to be born
ข	kʰ	ของ	kʰɔːŋ	n. thing
ฃ	x	ฃึ้น (ขึ้น)	xɯn	v. to go up
ค	g	ครู	gruː	n. teacher
ฅ	ɣ	ฅวาม (ความ)	ɣwaːm	n. affair; matter; content
ฆ	g	ฆ่า	gaː	v. to kill
ง	ŋ	งก	ŋok	adj. greedy
หง	ŋ̊	หงอก	ŋ̊ɔːk	v. to whiten (hair)
วรรค จ | Varga Jor
จ	tɕ	ใจ	tɕaɯ	n. heart
ฉ	tɕʰ	ฉาย	tɕʰaːj	v. to shine (on something)
ช	dʑ	ชื่อ	dʑɯː	n. name
ซ	z - ʑ	ซ้ำ	zam	adv. repeatedly
ญ	ɲ	ญวน	ɲuan	v. Vietnam (archaic)
หญ	ɲ̊	หญิง	ɲ̊iŋ	n. woman
วรรค ฏ | Varga Tor Patak
ฎ	ʔd	ฎีกา	ʔdiː.kaː	n. petition notice
ฏ	t	ฏาร	taː.raʔ	n. Ganymede
ฐ	tʰ	ฐาน	tʰaːn	n. base, platform
ณ	n	เณร	neːn	n. novice monk
วรรค ต | Varga Tor Tao
ด	ʔd	ดาว	ʔdaːw	n. star
ต	t	ตา	taː	n. eye
ถ	tʰ	ถอย	tʰɔj	v. to move back
ท	d	ทอง	dɔːŋ	n. gold
ธ	d	ธุระ	du.raʔ	n. business; affairs; errands
น	n	น้ำ	naːm	n. water
หน	n̊	หนู	n̊uː	n. mouse
วรรค ป | Varga Por
บ	ʔb	บ้าน	ʔbaːn	n. house
ป	p	ปลา	plaː	n. fish
ผ	pʰ	ผึ้ง	pʰɯŋ	n. bee
ฝ	f	ฝัน	fan	n. dream
พ	b	พ่อ	bɔː	n. father
ฟ	v	ฟัน	van	n. tooth
ภ	b	ภาษา	baː.saː	n. language
ม	m	แม่	mɛː	n. mother
หม	m̊	หมา	m̊aː	n. dog
อวรรค | Avarga
อย	ʔj	อย่า	ʔjaː	adv. do not
ย	j	เย็น	jen	adj. cold
หย	j̊	เหยียบ	j̊iap	v. to step on
ร	r	รัก	rak	v. to love
หร	r̊	หรือ	r̊ɯː	conj. or
ล	l	ลม	lom	n. wind
หล	l̥	หล่อ	l̥ɔː	adj. handsome
ว	w	วัน	wan	n. day
หว	ẘ	หวี	ẘiː	n. comb
ศ	s	ศาล	saːn	n. court of law
ษ	s	ฤๅษรี (ฤๅษี)	rɯː.siː	n. hermit
ส	s	สวย	suaj	adj. beautiful
อ	ʔ	อ้าย	ʔaːj	n. first born son

== Unicode ==
Thai script was added to the Unicode Standard in October 1991 with the release of version 1.0.

The Unicode block for Thai is U+0E00–U+0E7F. It is a verbatim copy of the older TIS-620 character set which encodes the vowels เ, แ, โ, ใ and ไ before the consonants they follow, and thus Thai, Lao, Tai Viet and New Tai Lue are the only Brahmic scripts in Unicode that use visual order instead of logical order.

Thai^{[1]}^{[2]} Official Unicode Consortium code chart (PDF)
	0	1	2	3	4	5	6	7	8	9	A	B	C	D	E	F
U+0E0x		ก	ข	ฃ	ค	ฅ	ฆ	ง	จ	ฉ	ช	ซ	ฌ	ญ	ฎ	ฏ
U+0E1x	ฐ	ฑ	ฒ	ณ	ด	ต	ถ	ท	ธ	น	บ	ป	ผ	ฝ	พ	ฟ
U+0E2x	ภ	ม	ย	ร	ฤ	ล	ฦ	ว	ศ	ษ	ส	ห	ฬ	อ	ฮ	ฯ
U+0E3x	ะ	ั	า	ำ	ิ	ี	ึ	ื	ุ	ู	ฺ					฿
U+0E4x	เ	แ	โ	ใ	ไ	ๅ	ๆ	็	่	้	๊	๋	์	ํ	๎	๏
U+0E5x	๐	๑	๒	๓	๔	๕	๖	๗	๘	๙	๚	๛				
U+0E6x																
U+0E7x																
Notes 1.As of Unicode version 18.0 2.Grey areas indicate non-assigned code points

== Keyboard layouts ==
Thai characters can be typed using the Kedmanee layout and the Pattachote layout.

== See also ==
- Thai language
- Thai typography
- Thai numerals
- Thai braille
- Thai literature
- Thai honorifics
- Thai spelling reform of 1942 – simplified spelling system in use from 1942 to 1944
- Sukhothai script – also called proto-Thai script or Ram Khamhaeng alphabet
