= Kho khuat =

Thai letter

- ฃ

Usage
- Writing system: Thai script
- Type: Abugida
- Language of origin: Thai language
- Sound values: [kʰ] [k̚]
- In Unicode: U+0E03
- Lexicographic position: 3

History
- Time period: 1283 to present
- Transliterations: Kho Khai

Other
- Writing direction: Left-to-Right

Kho khuat (ฃ ขวด, khuat is Thai for 'bottle') is the third letter of the Thai alphabet. It is a high consonant in the Thai tripartite consonant system (ไตรยางศ์, informally อักษรสามหมู่). It represents the sound [k^{h}] as an initial consonant and [k̚] as a final consonant. The letter is now rarely used, being replaced universally by kho khai (ข ไข่). There are currently no words using kho khuat in Thai language according to the Royal Institute Dictionary of 1999, the official standard current dictionary of the Thai language. However, kho khuat still has an entry in most dictionaries stating that it is obsolete, and is included on alphabet charts in order to preserve the traditional count of 44 Thai consonants.

== History ==
=== Origins ===
Early evidence of kho khuat can be found in the Ram Khamhaeng Inscription from the Sukhothai Period, which contains 11 words containing the letter. Additionally, there are a number of other similar inscriptions that contain the letter, including the Pa Nang Mo Inscription, the Pho Kun Ram Phon Inscription, the Kam Phaeng Ngam Inscription, and the Sadaeng Phon Kam Nam Su Nipphan Inscription.

Linguists believe that at the time kho khuat likely represented the velar fricative [x] and was originally distinguished from kho khai, which represents [k^{h}]. Cognates of words beginning with kho khai and kho khuat in other Tai languages, such as Tai Dón, also consistently show different sounds. Later on, kho khuat gradually came to sound the same as kho khai, evidence of which may be seen from later inscriptions beginning to mix up the two letters.

=== Fall out of use ===
Both ฃ (kho khuat) and ฅ (kho khon) fell out of use at the same time when the first Thai-script typewriters were brought to Thailand in 1896, for there was no space for all characters in their 84 key keyboard. Thus these two letters, which at that point were already becoming rare, were chosen to be done away with. Even after the shift key was invented and the number of keys in typewriters was reduced to half, those two letters were not reinstated. They are, however, present on modern keyboards and are specified as part of the official standard. The reasons why precisely these two letters were chosen and not others is not known, but neither ฃ kho khuat nor ฅ kho khon correspond to letters of the Sanskrit or the Pali alphabet.

==== Revival movement ====
There is a minor movement for conservative spelling among some Thai publishers, one goal of which is to bring kho khuat and kho khon back into currency. One such publisher is Butterfly Book House (สำนักพิมพ์ผีเสื้อ), which publishes children's literature both by Thai authors and Thai translations of foreign authors, such as Roald Dahl. In its books, words like ขวด and คน are spelled ฃวด and ฅน, despite the fact that the apparently "conservative" spelling is sometimes arguably not the etymologically correct one, as with ฅน for คน. As for the latter, a 2006 film set in 1890s Siam and titled in Thai: ฅนไฟบิน Flying Fire Person (in English: Dynamite Warrior), uses ฅ kho khon to spell ฅน (khon, 'person'). "Person" is the standard example word for ฅ in consonantal charts, but is spelled คน.

== See also ==
- Thai folklore
