= George B. McFarland =

American physician in Siam (1866–1942)

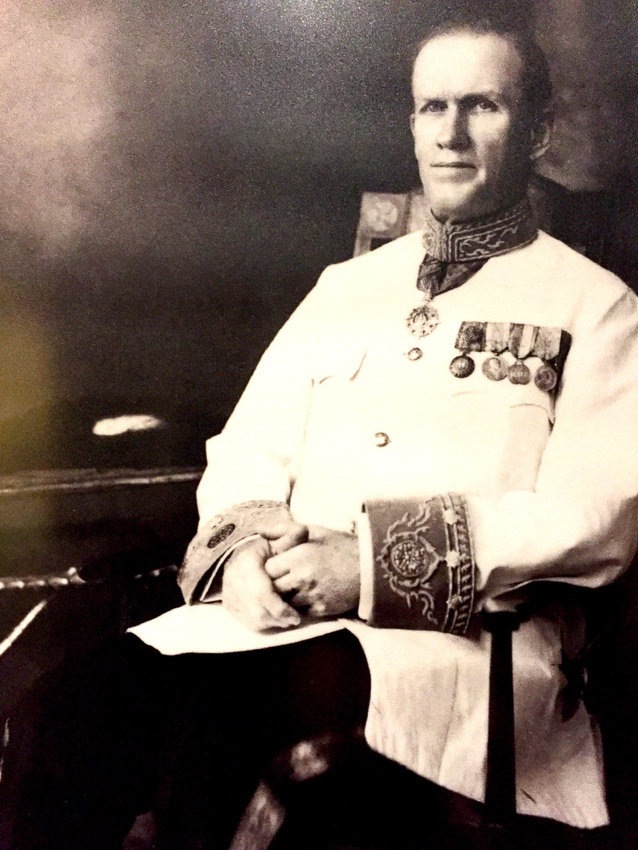

George Bradley McFarland (1866–1942), also known by the Thai noble title Phra Ach Vidyagama (Thai: พระอาจวิทยาคม, RTGS: Phra Atwitthayakhom), was a Siam-born American physician who was instrumental in establishing modern medical education in Thailand. A son of Presbyterian missionary Samuel G. McFarland, he was born and grew up in Siam (as Thailand was then known) and studied medicine and dentistry in the United States, before returning to head the newly established Royal Medical College at Siriraj Hospital (now the Faculty of Medicine Siriraj Hospital at Mahidol University), where he taught for 35 years before retiring. He wrote the first Thai medical textbooks, compiled a Thai–English dictionary, and popularized the use of Thai-language typewriters.
