= Nasal release =

Manner of articulation

◌ⁿ
- IPA number: 425

Encoding
- Entity (decimal): &#8319;
- Unicode (hex): U+207F

In phonetics, a nasal release is the release of a stop consonant into a nasal. Such sounds are transcribed in the International Phonetic Alphabet with superscript nasal letters, for example as [tⁿ] in English catnip [ˈkætⁿnɪp]. In English words such as sudden in which historically the tongue made separate contacts with the alveolar ridge for the /d/ and /n/, [ˈsʌdən], many speakers today make only one contact. That is, the /d/ is released directly into the /n/: [ˈsʌdⁿn̩]. Although this is a minor phonetic detail in English (in fact, it is commonly transcribed as having no audible release: [ˈkæt̚nɪp], [ˈsʌd̚n̩]), nasal release is more important in some other languages.

== In Atlantic-Congo languages ==
The Gãã language of Nigeria has velar and labiovelar stops with nasal release:

kpŋmɛ̃ 'all', also prenasalized ŋ́kpŋmɑ̃̀ 'beak'
gbŋmáp 'to crawl'
gŋǎsī 'crow'

== Prestopped nasals ==
In some languages, such consonants may occur before vowels and are called prestopped nasals.

Prestopped nasals and prenasalized stops occur when the oral cavity is closed and the nasal cavity is opened by lowering the velum, but the timing of both events does not coincide. A prenasalized stop starts out with a lowered velum that raises during the occlusion, much like the [nd] in candy. A postnasalized stop or prestopped nasal begins with a raised velum that lowers during the occlusion. That causes an audible nasal release, as in English sudden.

The Slavic languages are most famous for having (non-phonemic) prestopped nasals. That can be seen in place names such as the Dniester River. The Russian word for "day", for example, is inflected день, дня, дни, дней [dʲenʲ, dⁿnʲa, dⁿnʲi, dⁿnʲej], "day, day's, days, days'".

Prestopped nasals area also found in Australia. Eastern Arrernte has both prenasalized stops and prestopped nasals, but it does not have word-initial consonant clusters. Compare [mʷaɻə] "good" (with nasal stop), [ᵐbʷaɻə] "make" (with prenasalized stop), [ᵖmʷaɻə] "coolamon" (with prestopped nasal).

There is little or no phonetic difference between a "prenasalized stop" (/ⁿd/) and a cluster (/nd/). It is similar for prestopped nasals. The difference is essentially one of phonological analysis. For example, languages with word-initial /nd/ (or /ⁿd/) but no other word-initial clusters, will often be analyzed as having a unitary prenasalized stop rather than a cluster of nasal + stop. For some languages, it is claimed that a difference exists (often medially) between /ⁿd/ and /nd/. Even in such cases, however, alternative analyses are possible. Ladefoged and Maddieson investigated one such claimed case and concluded that the two sounds were better analyzed as /nd/ and /nnd/, respectively.

== Final consonants with nasal release ==
Some languages such as Vietnamese and Malay, which are generally described as having no audible release in final stops, actually have a short nasal release in such cases. Since all final stops in these two languages are voiceless, the nasal release is voiceless as well.

Although the difference is commonly chalked up to aspiration, final nasal release is contrastive in Wolof:

Contrasting releases in Wolof
Nasal release		Aspirated release	
[lapᵐ̥]	'to drown'	[lapʰ]	'to be thin'
[ɡɔkᵑ̊]	'bridle rope'	[ɡɔkʰ]	'white chalk'

== See also ==
- Lateral release (phonetics)
- No audible release
- Prestopped nasal consonant

Place →	Labial					Coronal										Dorsal					Laryngeal			
Manner ↓	Bilabial		Labiodental		Linguolabial		Dental		Alveolar		Postalveolar		Retroflex		(Alveolo-)palatal		Velar		Uvular		Pharyngeal/epiglottal		Glottal	
Nasal	m̥	m	ɱ̊	ɱ		n̼	n̪̊	n̪	n̥	n	n̠̊	n̠	ɳ̊	ɳ	ɲ̊	ɲ	ŋ̊	ŋ	ɴ̥	ɴ				
Plosive	p	b	p̪	b̪	t̼	d̼	t̪	d̪	t	d			ʈ	ɖ	c	ɟ	k	ɡ	q	ɢ	ʡ		ʔ	
Sibilant affricate							t̪s̪	d̪z̪	ts	dz	t̠ʃ	d̠ʒ	tʂ	dʐ	tɕ	dʑ								
Non-sibilant affricate	pɸ	bβ	p̪f	b̪v			t̪θ	d̪ð	tɹ̝̊	dɹ̝	t̠ɹ̠̊˔	d̠ɹ̠˔			cç	ɟʝ	kx	ɡɣ	qχ	ɢʁ	ʡʜ	ʡʢ	ʔh	
Sibilant fricative							s̪	z̪	s	z	ʃ	ʒ	ʂ	ʐ	ɕ	ʑ								
Non-sibilant fricative	ɸ	β	f	v	θ̼	ð̼	θ	ð	θ̠	ð̠	ɹ̠̊˔	ɹ̠˔	ɻ̊˔	ɻ˔	ç	ʝ	x	ɣ	χ	ʁ	ħ	ʕ	h	ɦ
Approximant		β̞		ʋ				ð̞		ɹ		ɹ̠		ɻ		j		ɰ						˷
Tap/flap		ⱱ̟		ⱱ					ɾ̥	ɾ			ɽ̊	ɽ						ɢ̆		ʡ̮		
Trill	ʙ̥	ʙ							r̥	r		r̠	ɽ̊r̥	ɽr					ʀ̥	ʀ	ʜ	ʢ		
Lateral affricate									tɬ	dɮ			tꞎ	d𝼅	c𝼆	ɟʎ̝	k𝼄	ɡʟ̝						
Lateral fricative							ɬ̪		ɬ	ɮ			ꞎ	𝼅	𝼆	ʎ̝	𝼄	ʟ̝						
Lateral approximant								l̪	l̥	l		l̠	ɭ̊	ɭ	ʎ̥	ʎ	ʟ̥	ʟ		ʟ̠				
Lateral tap/flap									ɺ̥	ɺ			𝼈̊	𝼈		ʎ̮		ʟ̆						

		BL	LD	D	A	PA	RF	P	V	U
Implosive	Voiced	ɓ			ɗ		ᶑ	ʄ	ɠ	ʛ
Implosive	Voiceless	ɓ̥			ɗ̥		ᶑ̊	ʄ̊	ɠ̊	ʛ̥
Ejective	Stop	pʼ			tʼ		ʈʼ	cʼ	kʼ	qʼ
Ejective	Affricate		p̪fʼ	t̪θʼ	tsʼ	t̠ʃʼ	tʂʼ	tɕʼ	kxʼ	qχʼ
Ejective	Fricative	ɸʼ	fʼ	θʼ	sʼ	ʃʼ	ʂʼ	ɕʼ	xʼ	χʼ
Ejective	Lateral affricate				tɬʼ			c𝼆ʼ	k𝼄ʼ	q𝼄ʼ
Ejective	Lateral fricative				ɬʼ					
Click (top: velar; bottom: uvular)	Tenuis	kʘ qʘ		kǀ qǀ	kǃ qǃ		k𝼊 q𝼊	kǂ qǂ		
Click (top: velar; bottom: uvular)	Voiced	ɡʘ ɢʘ		ɡǀ ɢǀ	ɡǃ ɢǃ		ɡ𝼊 ɢ𝼊	ɡǂ ɢǂ		
Click (top: velar; bottom: uvular)	Nasal	ŋʘ ɴʘ		ŋǀ ɴǀ	ŋǃ ɴǃ		ŋ𝼊 ɴ𝼊	ŋǂ ɴǂ	ʞ	
Click (top: velar; bottom: uvular)	Tenuis lateral				kǁ qǁ					
Click (top: velar; bottom: uvular)	Voiced lateral				ɡǁ ɢǁ					
Click (top: velar; bottom: uvular)	Nasal lateral				ŋǁ ɴǁ					
