= Thai typewriter =

Typewriters used to type the Thai script

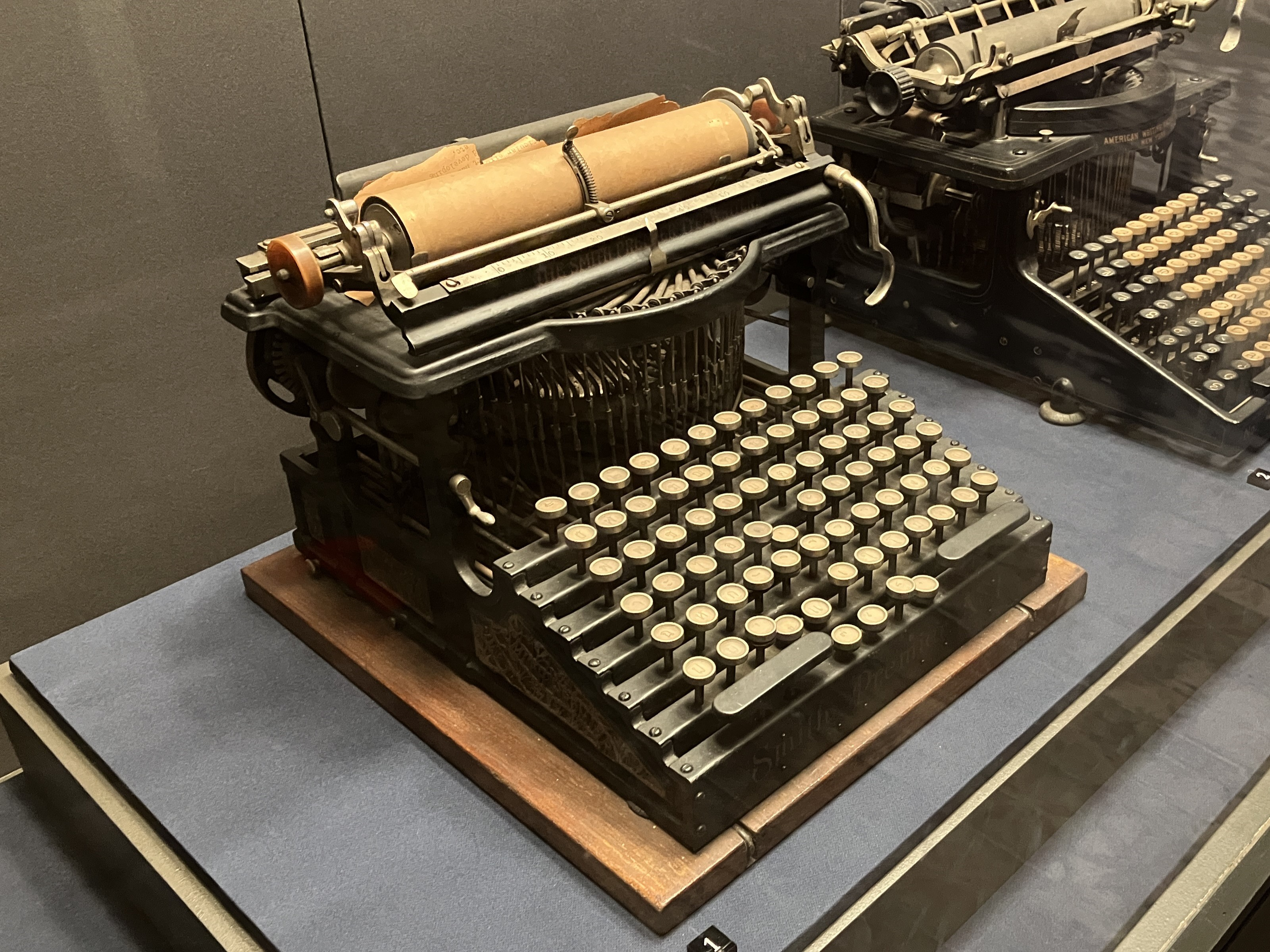
A Smith Premier No. 1 typewriter, c. 1892. The Smith Premier was the first typewriter modified for the Thai script.

Typewriters with the capability to print the Thai script were first developed in 1891 by Edwin Hunter McFarland, based on double-keyboard Smith Premier models. They became widely popular, especially for government use, though their production was discontinued in 1915 and newer shift-based layouts were subsequently developed by Edwin's brother George B. McFarland. The traditional keyboard layout, now known as Kedmanee, was introduced in 1931 and became the de facto standard, remaining popular even when the newer Pattachote layout, introduced in 1965, was officially endorsed by the government but failed to gain traction. The use of typewriters rapidly declined toward the end of the 20th century, when they were displaced by personal computers, though their layouts served as precursors to those of modern computer keyboards.

The typewriter modified Thai typography and orthography in several ways, most significantly expediting the obsolescence of the consonants kho khuat and kho khon, which were left out of the earliest typewriters due to space limitations.

== History ==
=== First Thai typewriters ===
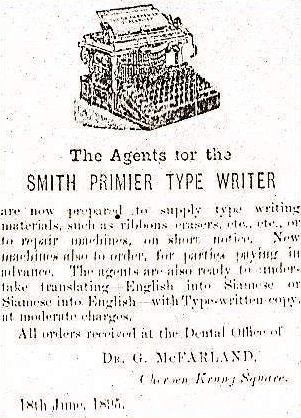
An 1895 advertisement in the Bangkok Times for the Smith Premier typewriter dealership, then held at George B. McFarland's dental practice

Following the introduction and popularization of typewriters in the West in the 1880s, the first Thai typewriter was developed by Edwin Hunter McFarland, a Thai-born son of American missionary Samuel G. McFarland. In 1891, Edwin took leave from his work as a secretary to Prince Damrong Rajanubhab (then Minister of Public Instruction) to work with type-cutters in Syracuse, New York, to modify the recently introduced Smith Premier typewriter for Thai characters.

McFarland chose the Smith Premier for his base model as it featured a seven-row "double" keyboard (one that separately included both uppercase and lowercase keys, without a shift mechanism) which was large enough to accommodate most of the Thai alphabet's 44 consonants and over 20 vowel symbols and tone marks, in addition to digits and punctuation marks. However, not all characters could be fitted into the model's 76 keys, and McFarland decided to exclude two less used consonants, ฃ kho khuat and ฅ kho khon, which contributed to their eventual obsolescence.

McFarland brought his typewriter to Siam in 1892 and presented it to King Chulalongkorn (Rama V), who was impressed and ordered 17 machines for government use. The typewriters soon became indispensable in government affairs and found heavy use, just as centralizing reforms were being implemented to modernize the country's administration through the expanding bureaucracy.

Edwin McFarland died in 1895, leaving the typewriter business to his younger brother George B. McFarland, a medical doctor who was by then head of the Royal Medical College at Siriraj Hospital. In 1897, George established a Smith Premier dealership on Charoen Krung Road (on the corner of Unakan Intersection in the area now known as Wang Burapha), and the business flourished, importing and selling thousands of units over the next few years alone. By the 1910s, it was being used in government offices all over the country, as well as many private businesses.

=== Switch to shift layouts ===
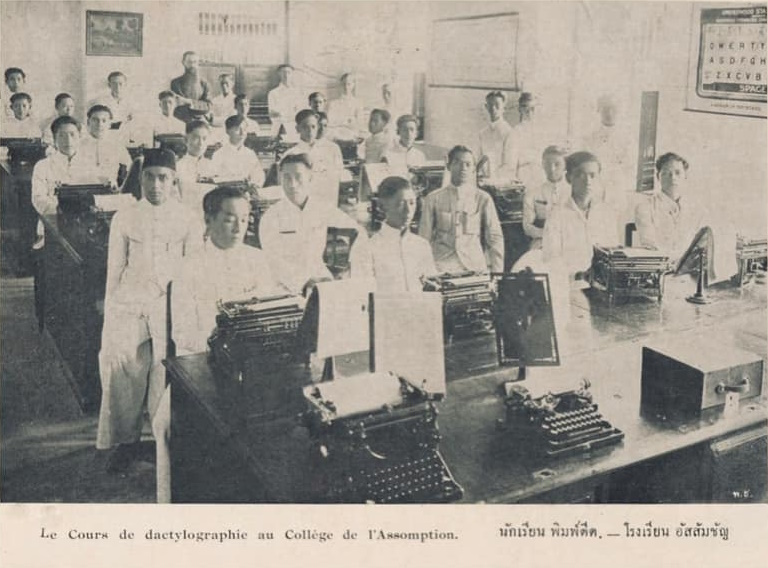
Typing class at Assumption College, c. 1927. The school was among the first institutions to systematically train its students in touch typing.

During this time, the Smith Premier brand had been acquired by the Remington Typewriter Company, who in 1915 discontinued the production of double-keyboard models, which were unsuited for touch typing. This adversely affected Thai users. Remington supplied McFarland with a replacement model that utilized a shift layout, but it was spurned by users, and McFarland resorted to supplying the market with second-hand older models refitted with Thai types and keys. It was not until McFarland, during a 1922 visit to the US, worked with Remington to create a newer portable Thai model (known by the Remington brand), that the shift system began to gain acceptance among Thai users. Further work with Remington in 1925 resulted in a desktop version that McFarland successfully marketed along with promotion of the touch-typing system. He established a typing school, offering three months of free training for each typewriter bought, and the shift system gained traction among users, eventually replacing the older Smith Premiers.

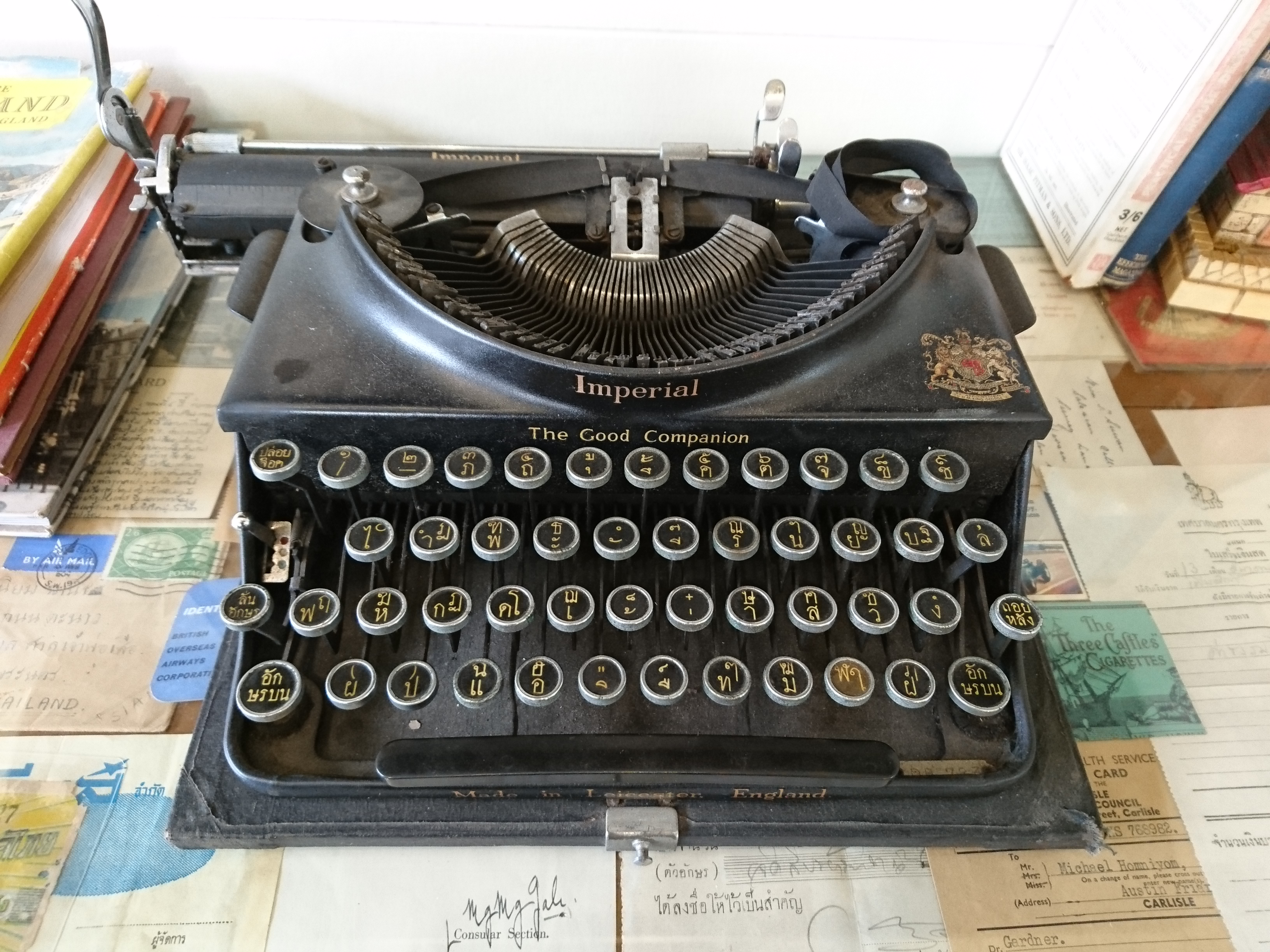
An Imperial "The Good Companion" typewriter, with the Kedmanee Thai layout. The model was produced from 1932 to the 1960s.

The early Thai shift typewriters had several design flaws. For example, characters with ascenders such as ฝ were missing, and had to be inputted as ผ. The dead keys for above- and below-line vowels and tone marks also had to be typed before their corresponding consonants, in reversal of the usual writing order. McFarland worked to eventually address these issues. Some sources state that he worked with two employees, Sawat Makprayun and Suwanprasert Ketmanee, (Note: Thai: สวัสดิ์ มากประยูร and สุวรรณประเสริฐ เกษมณี) analyzing 38 books over a period of seven years to redesign the layout, which was released in 1931, while others credit Wiriya Na Sinlawan and pastor Pluang Sudhikam (Note: วิริยะ ณ ศีลวันต์ and เปลื้อง สุทธิคำ) as the developers he worked with. In her biography of McFarland, his wife Bertha Blount writes that the new layout was scientifically developed so that "over fifty per cent of the keys most frequently struck lie in the second bank [home row], and less than ten per cent required use of the shift." McFarland brought the redesigned layout to Remington, who released new models accordingly, and the design became widely adopted, being taken up by competing manufacturers as well.

This key layout, which would later become known as the Kedmanee layout after its reputed designer, (Note: In a 1993 review of the history of Thai keyboard layouts, Thaweesak Koanantakool states that the attribution only first appeared in 1970, after the competing Pattachote layout was released.) became the de facto standard layout, used by most typewriters in the market over the following decades, even as McFarland's Remington imports were joined by brands Royal and Underwood from the US, Imperial from Britain, and most significantly in the post-World War II period, Olympia from West Germany. (Note: Exceptions exist, and Pracha Suveeranont has noted a counter-example in an Underwood Champion from 1946 exhibiting a non-Kedmanee Thai layout.) (Remington and Olympia would become regarded as the two most popular typewriter brands in Thailand.)

=== Pattachote layout ===
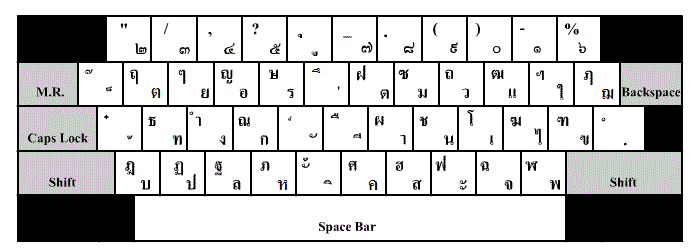
Pattachote keyboard layout map

In 1965, Sarit Pattajoti (Note: สฤษดิ์ ปัตตะโชติ) (or Pattachote), an engineer at the Royal Irrigation Department, analyzed key usage of the Kedmanee layout and found that it was heavily unbalanced (70%) toward the right hand, especially the little finger, which performed 19% of all key strokes. He proposed a new keyboard layout based on a statistical model, which distributed load mainly to the stronger fingers, near the home row, and more evenly between the two hands. It became known as the Pattachote layout.

The new layout was found to be 26.8% faster, and was endorsed by the Cabinet by recommendation of the National Research Council. Manufacturers were encouraged to produce them, government units were required to choose Pattachote typewriters for their procurements, and government employees were sent for retraining. However, the proposed change faced significant resistance as people were more used to the Kedmanee layout (which became named as such during this period). Most of the private sector did not see adequate reason to migrate, and the Pattachote layout failed to gain traction. By 1973, following the 14 October uprising which toppled the previous military government, the attempt at standardizing on Pattachote was abandoned.

When the Thai Industrial Standards Institute published its first standard layout for computer keyboards in 1988, the Kedmanee layout was used as the basis of its TIS 820-2531 standard. It has been universally followed by computer manufacturers, though the major computer operating systems have allowed the choice of either the Kedmanee or Pattachote layout at the software level.

=== Decline ===
Although Thai typewriter technology continued to evolve following world trends, their use rapidly declined toward the end of the 20th century, as they became supplanted by personal computers with word-processing capabilities. Most importers (manufacturing facilities were never established in the country, despite Olympia's Thai distributor having briefly considered doing so) either pivoted to other areas of business or ceased operating altogether. Despite having diversified, Vidhayakom Company, the Remington importer born out of McFarland's business following its dissolution during World War II, went out of business following the 1997 financial crisis, during which the government halted procurement of typewriters.

Today, a small market exists for vintage typewriters among collectors and enthusiasts, and a small number of typewriter repair and restoration specialists continue to operate independently, though they are the last of their generation, without any successors who might carry on their trade.

== Constraints and legacy ==
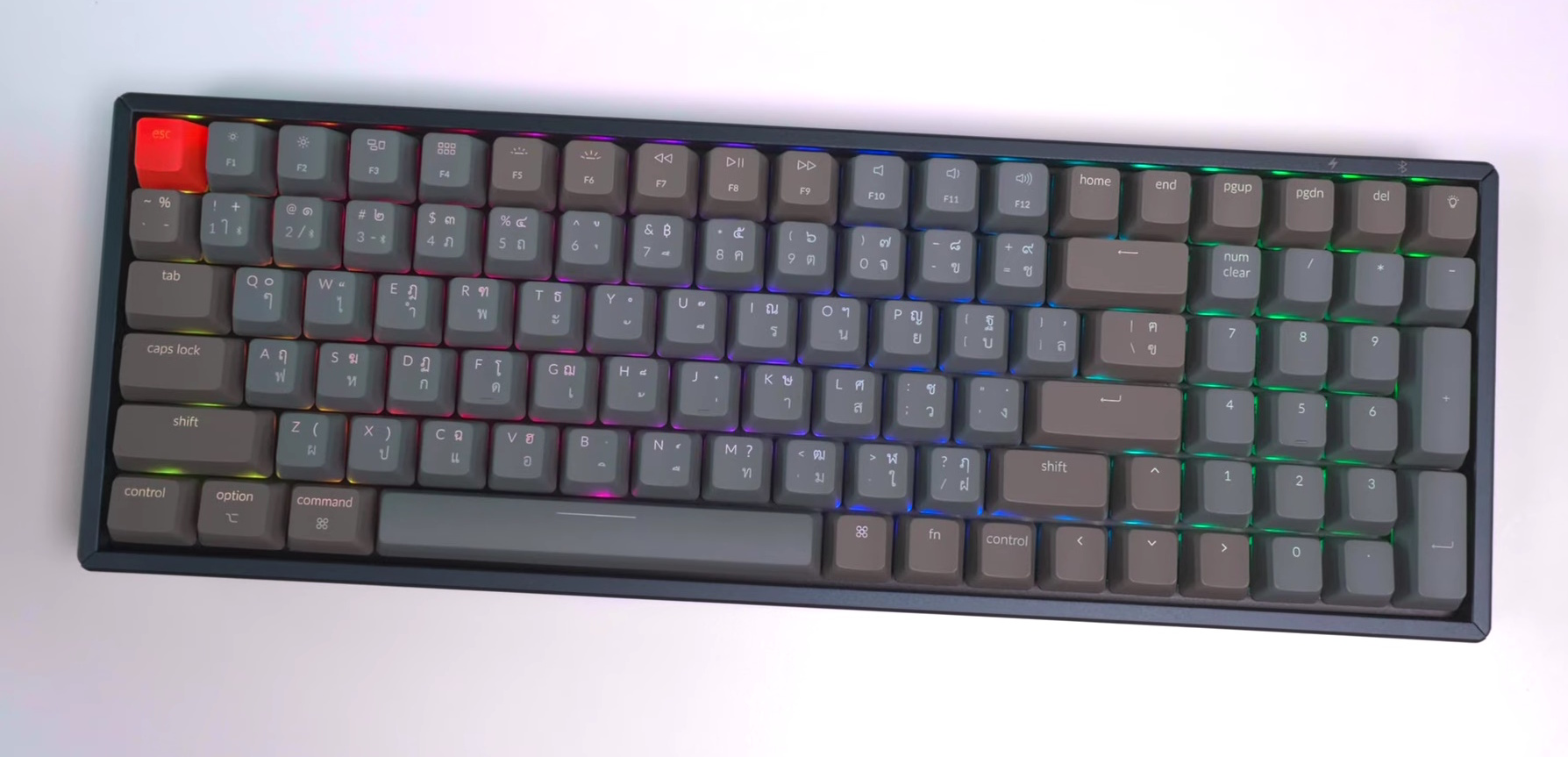
A modern mechanical keyboard showing the Kedmanee layout

In addition to bringing about the obsolescence of kho khuat and kho khon, the use of typewriters also had other effects on Thai typography and orthography. A few other symbols that were left out of the original typewriter layouts remain mostly unused and unrepresented on today's computer keyboards, despite having been reintroduced into standard Thai character sets, including Unicode. These include ◌๎ yamakkan (used to denote consonant clusters when writing Pali/Sanskrit), ๏ fongman (used to mark the opening of a poetic stanza), and ๚ angkhan khu and ๛ khomut (used to mark the end of stanzas/sections).

The Thai script consists of consonants sitting on the baseline, with vowel symbols placed in front of, behind, above, or below them. Tone marks are placed above the consonants, or further above the above-line vowels, if applicable. As typewriters could only print these above- and below-line symbols at fixed vertical positions, their introduction formalized a concept in Thai typography where characters were separated into four vertical levels: the baseline, two above it, and one below. This had an effect on the orthography of the language, since a consonant could only have one above-line symbol in each level as a result, and constructions such as เก็่ง [kèŋ] were rendered impossible to type as the vowel symbol ◌็ mai tai khu was in the same topmost level as the tone mark ◌่ mai ek. Such spellings were subsequently abandoned, and the word is now written as เก่ง.

While the level separation is not necessarily a restriction of digital typography, standardized implementation guidelines continue to be based on this paradigm, while incorrect vertical positioning of tone marks remains an issue with some digital fonts and applications.

As with computer keyboard layouts being based on those of the typewriter, digital character encodings of Thai also inherited input sequences from typewriter-based practice, and characters are input from left to right in visual order, unlike in some other Brahmic abugidas, where the vowel is always input after the consonant, following logical order. As a result, special considerations have to be made for the algorithmic sorting of Thai text, in order to sort words with leading vowels correctly by their consonant.
