= ก =

First letter of the Thai alphabet

- ก

Usage
- Writing system: Thai script Thai alphabet
- Type: Alphabetic
- Language of origin: Thai language
- Sound values: [k]
- In Unicode: U+0E01
- Lexicographic position: 1

Other
- Associated numbers: 1

ก is the first letter of the Thai Alphabet. It is used in the modern Thai language.

== History ==
ก derived from the Pallava Script of India. It was only a symbol until King Vajiravudh added a word after the letter, ก ไก่.

== Writing ==
The formal writing of ก is starting from the left side and then to the right side.

Writing ก
