= Thai Kedmanee keyboard layout =

Standard Thai language keyboard layout

Layout diagram based on the TIS 820-2538 (1995) standard

The Thai Kedmanee keyboard layout (Thai: แป้นพิมพ์เกษมณี) is the standard Thai language keyboard layout. It originated from the Thai typewriters introduced in the 1920s to replace older seven-row designs (in turn introduced by Edwin Hunter McFarland in the 1890s), and was simply known as the traditional layout until the 1970s, when it was named after its putative designer Suwanprasert Ketmanee (Thai: สุวรรณประเสริฐ เกษมณี) in order to distinguish it from the new alternative Thai Pattachote keyboard layout. The Kedmanee layout was codified as Thai Industrial Standard 820-2531 in 1988, with an update (820-2538) in 1995, and is the default Thai computer keyboard.
