= Thai Pattachote keyboard layout =

Alternative Thai language keyboard layout

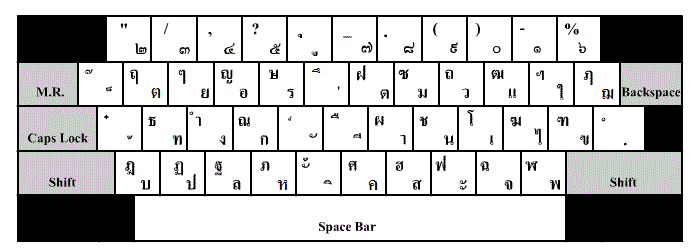
Thai Pattachote keyboard layout

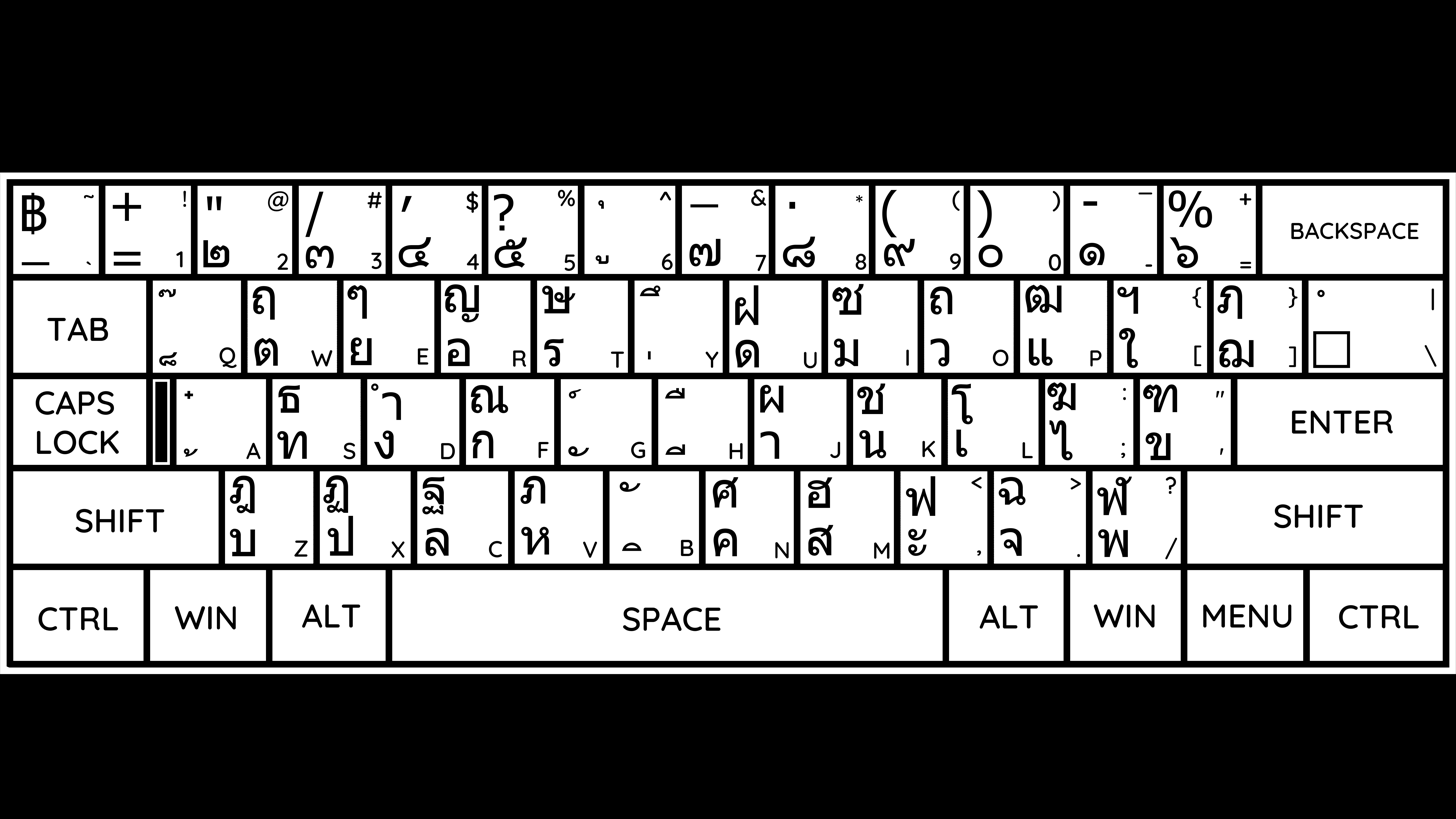

Pattachote keyboard (also Pattajoti keyboard, Thai: แป้นพิมพ์ปัตตะโชติ) is a Thai keyboard layout invented by Sarit Pattachote, as his research shows that the Thai Kedmanee keyboard layout uses the right hand more than the left hand, and the right little finger is used heavily. Thus, he invented the Pattachote keyboard layout.

Research by The National Research Council of Thailand suggests that the Pattachote keyboard can be typed on faster than the Kedmanee layout, but the Kedmanee layout has been in use longer and is more popular.

== See also ==
- Thai typewriter
