= No audible release =

Stop consonant without a release burst

◌̚

Encoding
- Entity (decimal): &#794;
- Unicode (hex): U+031A

A stop consonant with no audible release, also known as an unreleased stop or checked stop, or less commonly an applosive, unexploded stop or non-exploded stop, is a plosive with no release burst: no audible indication of the end of its occlusion (hold) through the mouth. This commonly occurs with consonants in sequence (such as the /p/ in English "apt") or in some parts of the world (such as Southeast Asia) with any stop at the end of a syllable, though here the remaining air pressure at the end of a word may be released through the nose. In the International Phonetic Alphabet, lack of an audible release is denoted with an upper-right corner diacritic (U+031A ◌̚ COMBINING LEFT ANGLE ABOVE) after the consonant letter, as in: [p̚], [t̚], [k̚], for English apt [ˈæp̚t].

Audibly released stops, on the other hand, are not normally transcribed as such in IPA. If a final stop is aspirated, the aspiration diacritic ⟨◌ʰ⟩ is sufficient to indicate the release: apt [ˈæp̚tʰ]. Otherwise, the "unaspirated" diacritic of the Extended IPA may be employed for this: apt [ˈæp̚t˭].

== English ==
Word-final unreleased stops in American English

In most dialects of English, the first stop of a cluster has no audible release, as in apt [ˈæp̚t], doctor [ˈdɒk̚tɚ], or logged on [ˌlɒɡ̚dˈɒn]. Although such sounds are frequently described as "unreleased", the reality is that since the two consonants overlap, the release of the former takes place during the hold of the latter, masking the former's release and making it inaudible. That can lead to cross-articulations that seem very much like deletions or complete assimilation.

For example, hundred pounds may auditorily appear to be [ˈhʌndɹɨb ˈpʰaundz], but X-ray and electropalatographic studies demonstrate that since inaudible and possibly-weakened contacts may still be made, the second /d/ in hundred pounds does not entirely assimilate a labial place of articulation but co-occurs with it.

In American English, a word-final stop is typically unreleased (though in some cases ejective, such as [kʼ] for word-final /k/); this is especially the case for /t/, but in word-final position, it is also analyzed as experiencing glottal reinforcement.

Such sounds may occur between vowels, as in some pronunciations of out a lot. The overlap appears to be with a glottal stop, such as in [t̚ʔ]: the /t/ is pronounced, and since it is between vowels, it must be released. However, its release is masked by the glottal stop (for /t/, this is known as t-glottalization).

The term "unreleased" is also used for a stop before a homorganic nasal, as in catnip. In such cases, however, the stop may be released as a nasal, and so might be more precisely transcribed [ˈkætⁿnɪp].

== Other languages ==
In most languages in East and Southeast Asia with final stops, such as Cantonese, Hokkien, Korean, Malay, Thai, and West Coast Bajau, the stops are not audibly released: mak [mak̚]. That is true even between vowels. That is thought to be caused by an overlapping glottal stop and is more precisely transcribed [mak̚ʔ]. A consequence of an inaudible release is that any aspirated–unaspirated distinction is neutralized. Some languages, such as Vietnamese, which are reported to have unreleased final stops, turn out to have short voiceless nasal releases instead. The excess pressure is released (voicelessly) through the nose and so there is no audible release to the stop.

=== Formosan languages ===
The Formosan languages of Taiwan, such as Tsou and Amis realize all obstruents as released but not aspirated, as in Tsou [ˈsip˭tɨ] "four" and [smuˈjuʔ˭tsu] "to pierce", or Amis [tsᵊtsaj] "one" and [sᵊpat˭] "four".

=== Gyalrong languages ===
In Gyalrongic languages, plosives and nasal stops could be unreleased after a glottal stop, for example:

- /pʰaroʔk/ > [pʰaˈrɔʔk̚]
- /təwaʔm/ > [t̪əˈwaʔm̚]

=== Pirahã ===
In Pirahã, the only surviving dialect of the Mura language, there is a special register of speech using solely humming, which does not involve an audible release and may be transcribed as [m̚] of different length and tone.

=== Munda ===
Munda languages such as Santali are characterized by checked syllable-final plosives that are both unreleased and glottalized.

=== Efik ===
The Efik language of southern Nigeria realizes final /b t k/ as unreleased [p̚ t̚ k̚].

== See also ==
- Checked tone
- Glottal reinforcement
- Lateral release (phonetics)
- Nasal release
- T-glottalization

== Sources ==
- Browman, Catherine P.; Goldstein, Louis (1990), "Tiers in articulatory phonology, with some implications for casual speech", in Kingston, John C.; Beckman, Mary E. (eds.), Papers in laboratory phonology I: Between the grammar and physics of speech, New York: Cambridge University Press, pp. 341–376
- Choo, Miho; O'Grady, William D. (2003), The Sounds of Korean: A Pronunciation Guide, Honolulu: University of Hawaii Press
- Nolan, Francis (1992), "The descriptive role of segments: Evidence from assimilation.", in Docherty, Gerard J.; Ladd, D. Robert (eds.), Papers in laboratory phonology II: Gesture, segment, prosody, New York: Cambridge University Press, pp. 261–280
- O'Neill, Gareth (2014). "Humming, whistling, singing, and yelling in Pirahã context and channels of communication in FDG1". Pragmatics. 24 (2): 349–375. doi:10.1075/prag.24.2.08nei.
- Zsiga, Elizabeth (2003), "Articulatory Timing in a Second Language: Evidence from Russian and English", Studies in Second Language Acquisition, 25: 399–432, doi:10.1017/s0272263103000160, S2CID 5998807
