= Samuel G. McFarland =

American Presbyterian missionary to Siam (1830–1897)

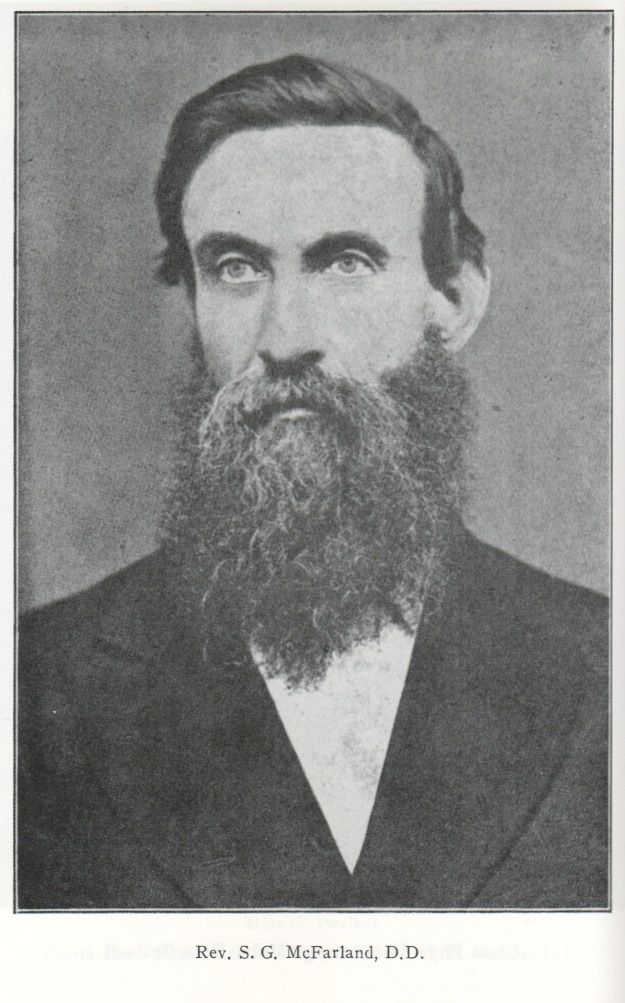

Samuel Gamble McFarland (December 11, 1830 – April 26, 1897) was an American Presbyterian missionary who worked mainly in Siam (Thailand) during the latter half of the 19th century. He and his wife settled in Phetchaburi, establishing churches and a school there, and he later came into the service of the government of King Chulalongkorn (Rama V) in Bangkok, heading the Suan Anan School (one of the earliest government schools aimed at educating sons of the nobility) from 1879 until its closure in 1892, after which he wrote Thai textbooks for the Department of Education. He most notably compiled an English–Thai dictionary which became the first widely used dictionary for Thai learners of English.

== Biography ==
Samuel G. McFarland was born on December 11, 1830, in Smith Township, Washington County, Pennsylvania to William and Mary McFarland. He graduated from Washington College in the class of 1857, and was ordained as a minister by the Presbytery of Washington in 1860. He married his wife, Jane E. Hays, on May 3, 1860; she was a daughter (born 1824) of John Hays, of Canonsburg, Pennsylvania.

Samuel and Jane left for missionary work in Siam in 1860, setting sail on June 5 after a farewell meeting held in Raccoon Church. They established a mission in the town of Phetchaburi, and organized two churches and a school there. In 1879, at the invitation of King Chulalongkorn, he took charge of the Suan Anan School, which had been established as a government school for Siamese boys of the higher classes, and became superintendent of education for the Siamese government. When the school closed down in 1892, he was assigned to the Bureau of Compilation, and wrote textbooks in Thai for the developing government school system, covering subjects such as botany, geography, geology, and bookkeeping. In his missionary work, he translated four books of the Pentateuch, a large portion of the minor prophets, the Westminster Confession of Faith, treatise on the Christian Evidence, a synopsis of church history, and a book of sermons.

Most noted among his works is an English–Thai dictionary, first published as the English–Siamese Word Book in 1866, and which was continued for ten editions, the later ones edited and published after his death by his son George. It was the first widely used dictionary in the country, and remained the primary reference used by Thai learners of English for four decades.

Due to his deteriorating health, McFarland returned with his wife to the United States in 1896. He died in Canonsburg April 26, 1897. Jane lived in Washington, D.C. with their daughter Mary until her death on June 9, 1908.

== Family ==
The McFarlands had four children—three sons and one daughter, all born in Bangkok under the care of missionary doctor Dan Beach Bradley: William, Edwin, George and Mary.

William Hays McFarland (November 7, 1862 – April 21, 1891) attended Washington & Jefferson College and worked in Pittsburgh for a year before returning to Siam in 1884, entering government service under the Ministry of War. He helped develop Thai-language military instruction terms, and wrote An English–Siamese Pronouncing Handbook. He married Mary McDonald in 1887 and had two daughters, Bessie and Willa, but soon died of cholera in Bangkok, aged 28.

Samuel Edwin Hunter McFarland (June 27, 1864 – August 8, 1895), known as Edwin, graduated from Washington & Jefferson in 1884 and returned to Siam with William, becoming secretary to Prince Damrong Rajanubhab when he was Minister of Public Instruction. He taught at the Suan Anan School, and wrote A Siamese Primer and Lessons in English. Most notably, he developed the first Thai-language typewriter, working with type-cutters in Syracuse, New York to modify the Smith Premier typewriter for Thai characters, and introduced it to the country in 1892. It later became widely adopted by the government, though he didn't live to see its popularity, having died at the age of 31 while in United States to study pharmacy.

George Bradley McFarland (December 1, 1866 – May 3, 1942) studied medicine and dentistry in the United States and returned to Siam in 1891, where headed the newly established Royal Medical College at Siriraj Hospital and pioneered modern medical education in the country. He continued to live in Siam his entire life. He wrote the first Thai medical textbooks, continued to edit and publish his father's dictionary, and set up a business to import the Smith Premier typewriters after Edwin's death.

Mary Cornwell McFarland (October 4, 1868 – January 17, 1943) attended Indiana State Normal School and the Kindergarten Association of Baltimore's training school, and lived in the United States, working as a kindergarten teacher in Washington, D.C. She donated Siamese material to the Smithsonian Institution in 1901.
