= Fakkham script =

Brahmic script

Fakkham Thai Lanna script
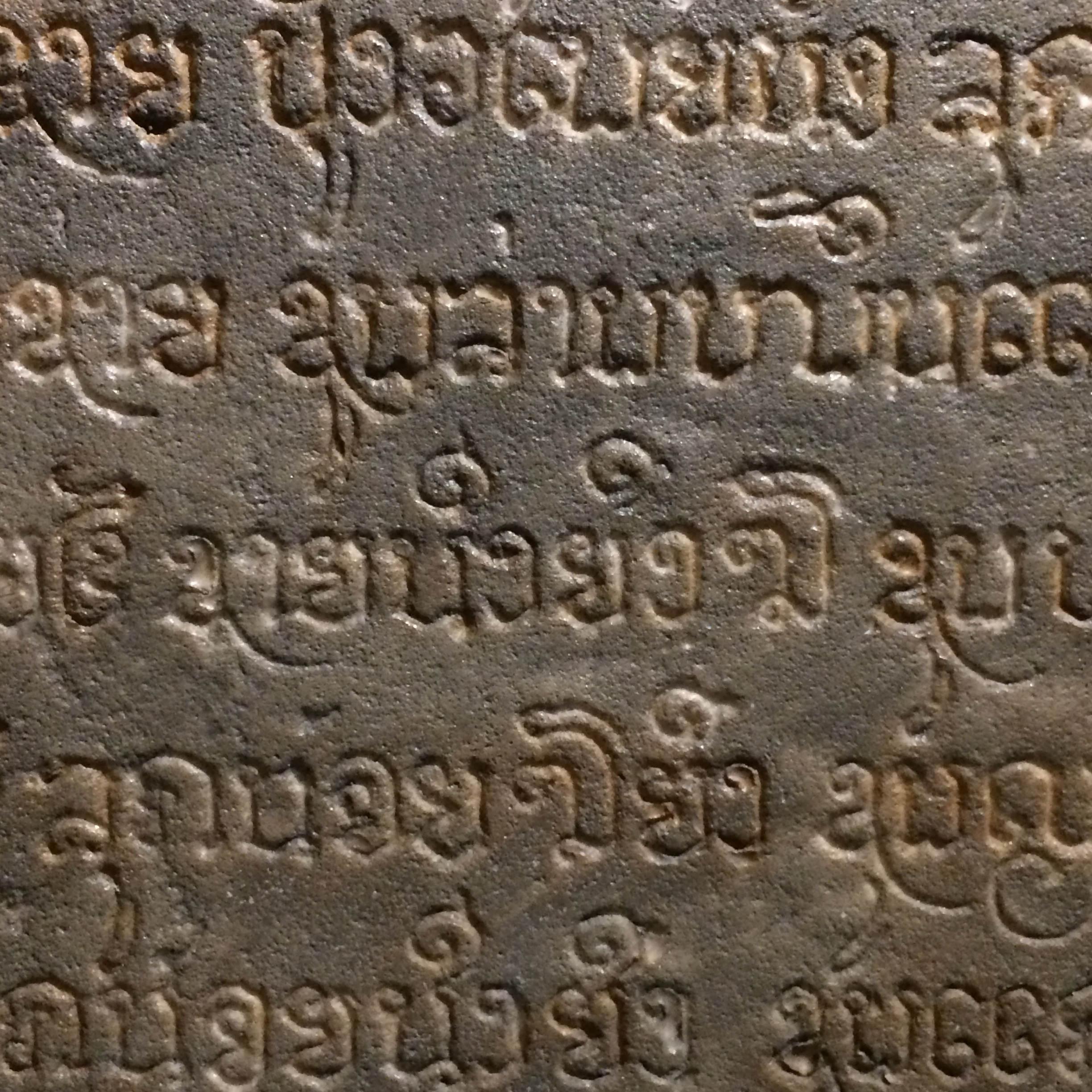
- Detail from the replica of Wat Chiang Man inscription (CM1) in Fakkham script
- Script type: Abugida
- Period: c. 1400-1900 CE
- Direction: Left-to-right
- Languages: Lao, Isan, and others

Related scripts
- Parent systems: Egyptian hieroglyphs: Phoenician; Aramaic; Brahmi; Tamil-Brahmi; Pallava; Old Khmer; Sukhothai; Fakkham
- Child systems: Tai Noi, Lai Tay, Thai Nithet
- Sister systems: Thai

The Fakkham script (Thai: อักษรฝักขาม; Lao: ອັກສອນຝັກຂາມ, "Tamarind pod-script") or Thai Lanna script is a Brahmic script, used historically in the Lanna Kingdom. The script was frequently used in Lanna stone inscriptions.

== Origin ==
The Fakkham script, was derived from the old Sukhothai script (also known as Proto-Thai script), and used extensively in Lanna between the beginning of the 15^{th} century until the early 20^{th} century. The Fakkham script was possibly introduced to Lanna by a religious mission from Sukhothai. The script was named after its similarity to the shape of tamarind pods, because the letters became elongated and somewhat more angular rather than square and perpendicular like its ancestor the Sukhothai script. Several letters had noticeable "tails" extending above and below the main writing line.

== History ==
The Fakkham script was used extensively in the territories controlled by the kings of Chiang Mai, the Lanna kingdom, between the beginning of the 15^{th} until the early 20^{th} centuries. It has been speculated that the Fakkham script was the official script of Lanna and other northern kingdoms, since the script was used in diplomatic notes of the Lanna kingdom sent to China. The Lanna kingdom used the Fakkham script as their secular script used for official inscriptions, important letters and other documents, while the Tai Tham script was used for religious texts.

A number of ancient inscriptions in the script have been discovered in the Bo Kaeo, Luang Nam Tha and Sayabouri provinces of Laos. The Fakkham script can be found on various royal steles around Vientiane, dating from the beginning of the second quarter of the 16th century.

The Fakkham script can be considered the prototype for the Lao script. It has been suggested that the script is the source of the White, Black, and Red Tai writing systems found in eastern Yunnan, northern Laos, and Vietnam.

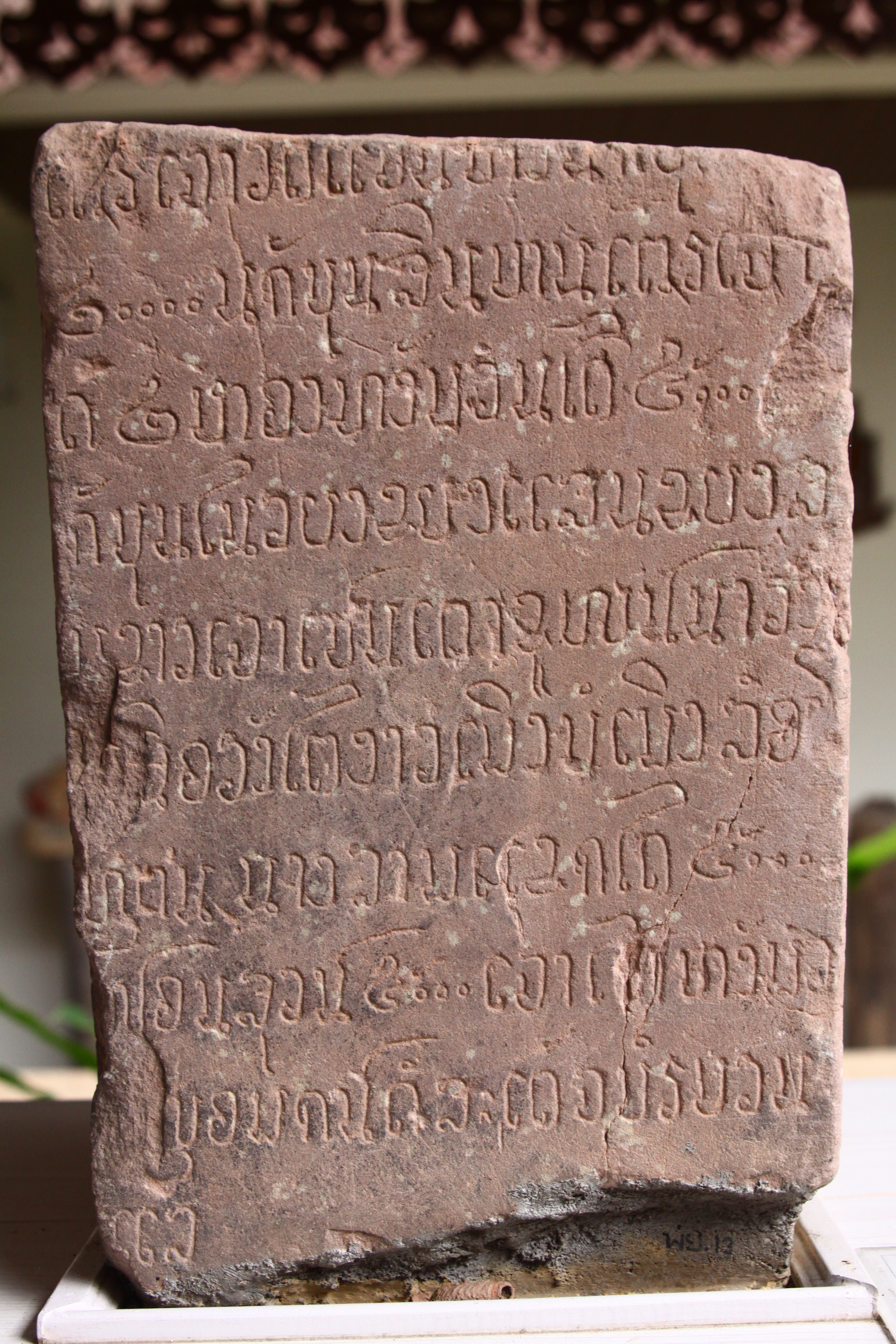
Stone inscription in Fakkham script from Thailand

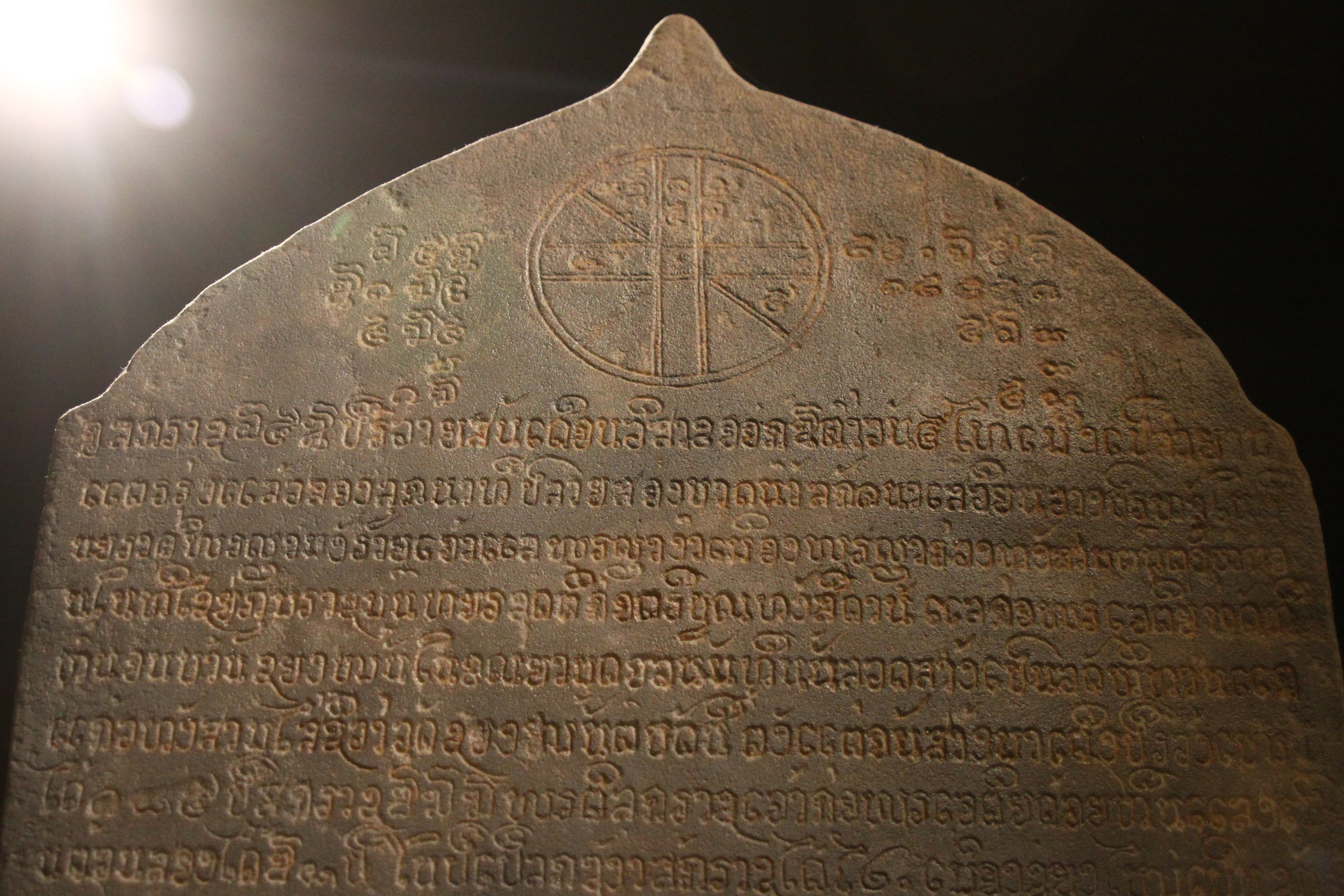
The Wat Chiang Man inscription (CM1) in Fakkham script (replica)

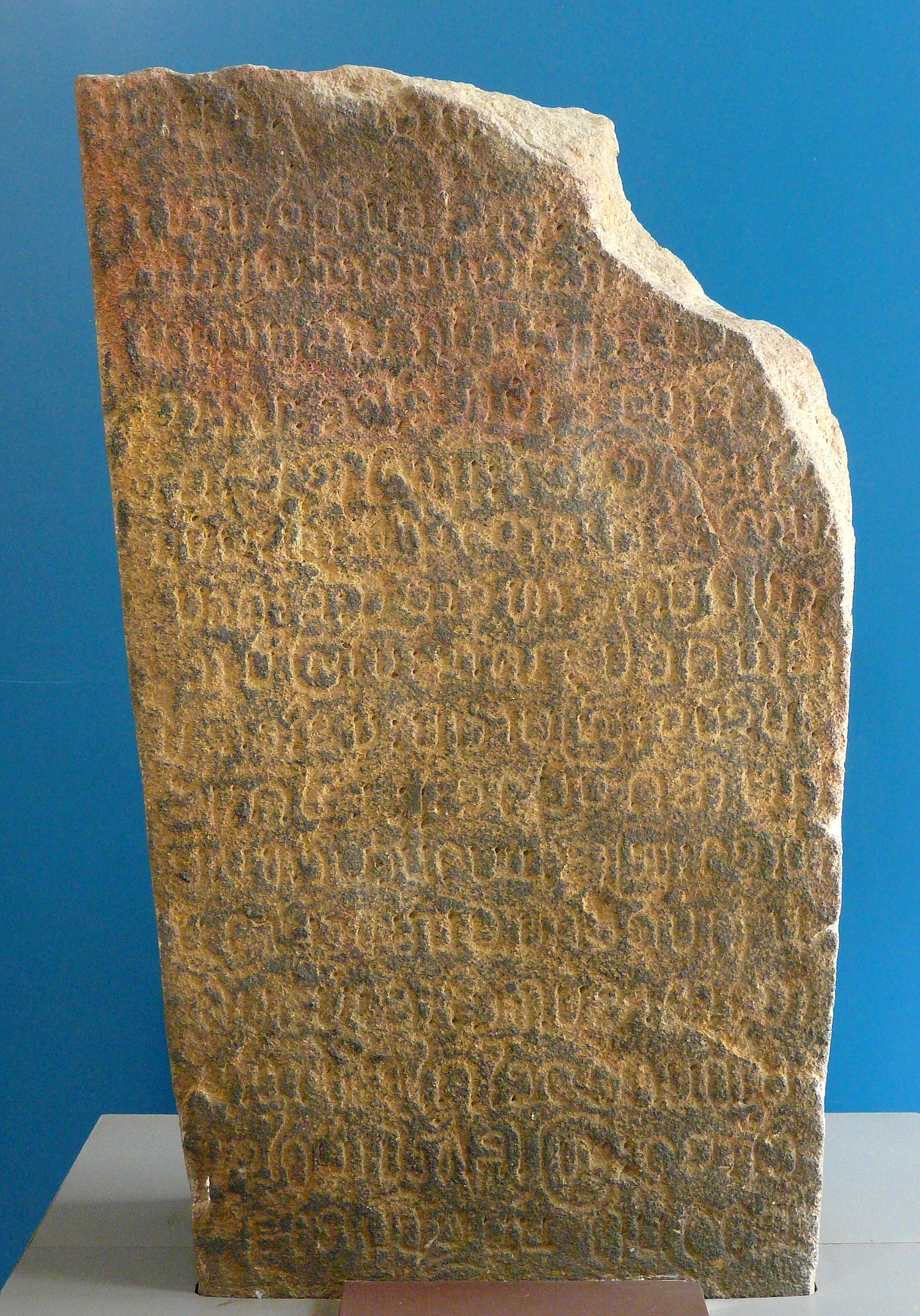
The Wat Lam Chang Inscription in Thai Lanna alphabet, 1444.

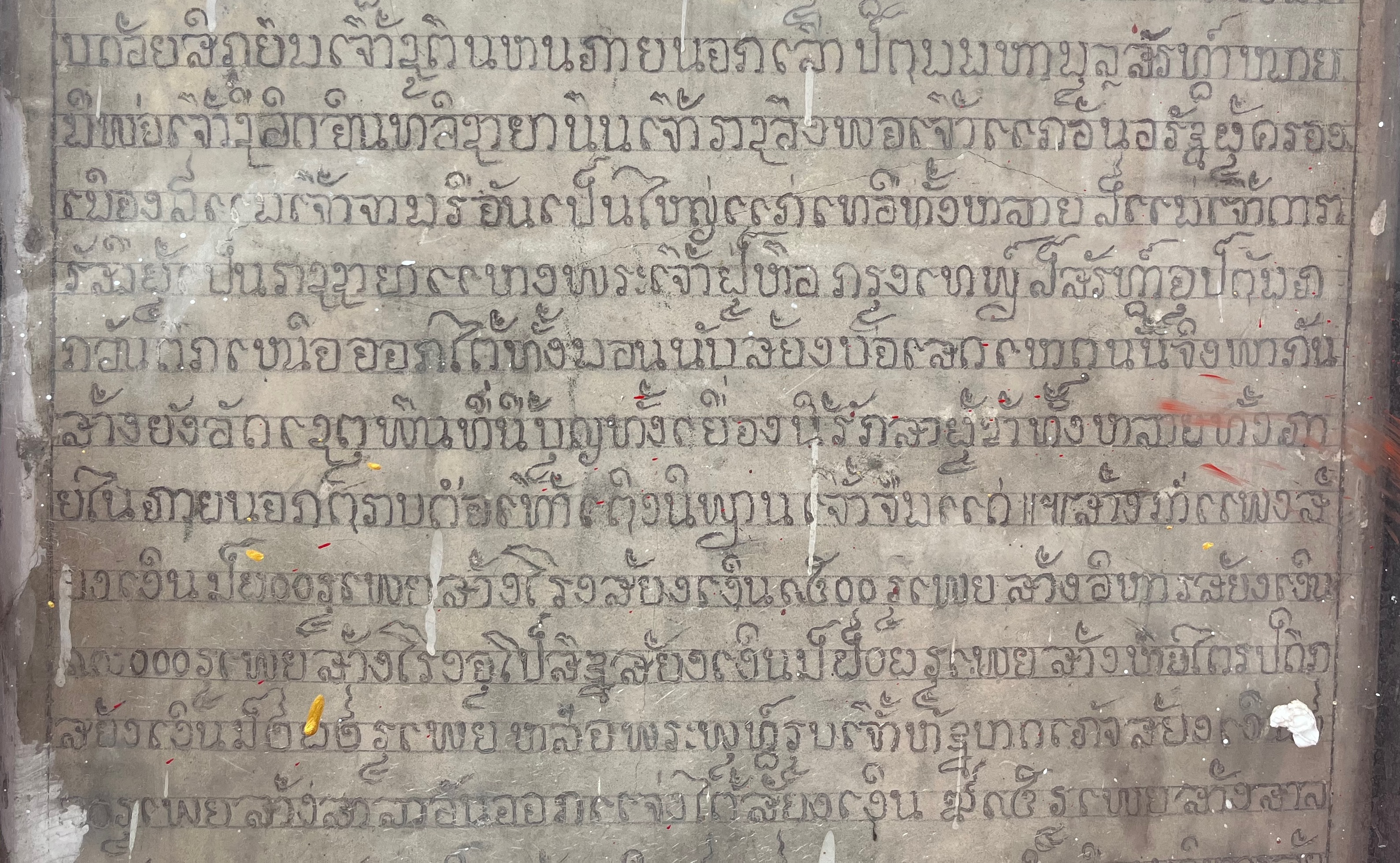
Wat Chetuphon Inscription, 1916 CE, the last inscription in Fakkham script in the traditional sense.

== Consonants ==
Fakkham script has 44 consonants: 41 original consonants derived from Sukhothai script and 3 adopted letters from Tai Tham (shown as yellow rows in the table below) i.e. ฌ, ฒ, and อฺย (or ຢ in Lao script). That is to say, Fakkham script in general has 43 similar consonants to modern Thai with an extra letter of อฺย (Lao ຢ). Fakkham script does not contain the letter ฮ. However, the letter later appears in Thai Nithet script, a descendant script that emerged in the 15^{th} century (and used in Lanna until the 18^{th} century, but very limited) as a hybrid between Fakkham and Tai Tham.

Some features of Fakkham script are different from modern Thai script. For example, ฎ and ฏ in Fakkham have the same form (see table below). Readers need to rely on the context to know which word is pronounced as ฎ /d/ or ฏ /t/. However, the spelling of such words is equivalent to the modern Thai counterparts. Besides, consonant letters like ฆ, ฑ, ว, and ฬ may have alternative forms, slightly different from the originals. Tai Tham consonant letters are also observed to be used concurrently with Fakkham consonant letters, especially among the inscriptions form the late 18^{th} century in Lanna.

Some Fakkham consonant letters have the subscription form i.e. ข, ค, ญ, ฐ, ถ, ธ, น, บ, ป, พ, ม, ย, อฺย, ร, ล, and ษ. Most of these letters' subscription form are borrowed from Tai Tham or Thai Nithet (or even Khom Thai script). However, these subscription forms are more prevalent among some specific Pali–Sanskrit loanwords (e.g. รฤกฺษ, องฺค, ทุกฺข, ธัมฺม, etc.) but scarcely found in words with Tai–Kadai roots.

Despite the fact that Fakkham script and modern Thai script are closely similar in shape and form, the pronunciation of Fakkham consonant letters differs drastically form Thai. Since Fakkham is used to transcribe the languages of Lanna (Lanna, Tai Khuen, and Tai Lue), the pronunciation of each letter is corresponded to Tai Tham equivalent letters and not modern Thai. For example, the word รา written in Fakkham is pronounced as /haː˧/ as in Northern Thai and not /raː˧/ like in standard Thai. Each Fakkham consonant can be classified into 3 classes (ไตรยางศ์) like Thai, Lao, and Tai Tham, but the classification is comparable with that of Tai Tham, instead of Thai or Lao.

	Fakkham Script		Thai	Lao	IPA		Class
	Consonants	Subscription Forms	Thai	Lao	Initial	Final	Class
1. Wak Ka			ก	ກ	[k]	[k̚]	High
1. Wak Ka			ข	ຂ	[x], [kʰ]	[k̚]	High
1. Wak Ka			ฃ		[x]	—	High
1. Wak Ka			ค	ຄ	[k]	[k̚]	Low
1. Wak Ka			ฅ		[x]	—	Low
1. Wak Ka	, ,		ฆ		[x], [kʰ]	[k̚]	Low
1. Wak Ka			ง	ງ	[ŋ]	[ŋ]	Low
2. Wak Ja			จ	ຈ	[t͡ɕ]	[t̚]	High
2. Wak Ja			ฉ		[s], [t͡ɕʰ]	—	High
2. Wak Ja			ช	ຊ	[t͡ɕ]	[t̚]	Low
2. Wak Ja			ซ		[s]	[t̚]	Low
2. Wak Ja	(Note: Borrowed or adopted from Tai Tham)		ฌ		[s], [t͡ɕʰa᷄]	[t̚]	Low
2. Wak Ja			ญ		[ɲ]	[n]	Low
3. Wak Rata			ฎ		[d]	[t̚]	Mid
3. Wak Rata			ฏ		[t]	[t̚]	High
3. Wak Rata		,	ฐ		[tʰ]	[t̚]	High
3. Wak Rata	,		ฑ		[d], [tʰ]	[t̚]	Low
3. Wak Rata			ฒ		[tʰ]	[t̚]	Low
3. Wak Rata			ณ		[n]	[n]	Low
4. Wak Ta			ด	ດ	[d]	[t̚]	Mid
4. Wak Ta			ต	ຕ	[t]	[t̚]	High
4. Wak Ta			ถ	ຖ	[tʰ]	[t̚]	High
4. Wak Ta			ท	ທ	[t]	[t̚]	Low
4. Wak Ta		,	ธ		[tʰ]	[t̚]	Low
4. Wak Ta			น	ນ	[n]	[n]	Low
5. Wak Pa			บ	ບ	[b]	[p̚]	Mid
5. Wak Pa			ป	ປ	[p]	[p̚]	High
5. Wak Pa			ผ	ຜ	[pʰ]	–	High
5. Wak Pa			ฝ	ຝ	[f]	–	High
5. Wak Pa			พ	ພ	[p]	[p̚]	Low
5. Wak Pa			ฟ	ຟ	[f]	[p̚]	Low
5. Wak Pa			ภ		[pʰ]	[p̚]	Low
5. Wak Pa		(Note: Borrowed or adopted from Thai Nithet script.) (Note: Similar to Khom Thai script)	ม	ມ	[m]	[m]	Low
6. Awak			ย	ຍ	[ɲ]	–	Low
6. Awak			อฺย	ຢ	[j]	–	Mid
6. Awak		,	ร	ຣ	[r], (Note: Influenced by Thai, Pali, or Sanskrit) [l], [h]	[n]	Low
6. Awak		,	ล	ລ	[l]	[n]	Low
6. Awak	,		ว	ວ	[w]	–	Low
6. Awak			ศ		[s]	[t̚]	High
6. Awak			ษ		[s]	[t̚]	High
6. Awak			ส	ສ	[s]	[t̚]	High
6. Awak			ห	ຫ	[h]	–	High
6. Awak	,		ฬ		[l]	[n]	Low
6. Awak			อ	ອ	[ʔ]	–	Mid
6. Awak	Unattested		ฮ	ຮ	[h]	–	Low

== Numerals ==
Fakkham numerals are very similar to both Lanna Tham numerals and modern Lao numerals. The digits 7 and 9 each have two common variant forms that are used interchangeably.

Fakkham numerals compared with related scripts
Arabic numeral	0	1	2	3	4	5	6	7	8	9
Fakkham										
Thai	๐	๑	๒	๓	๔	๕	๖	๗	๘	๙
Lao	໐	໑	໒	໓	໔	໕	໖	໗	໘	໙
Lanna Tham	᪐	᪑	᪒	᪓	᪔	᪕	᪖	᪗	᪘	᪙
