= Tai Noi script =

Brahmic script historically used in Laos and Isan

Tai Noi Lao Buhan
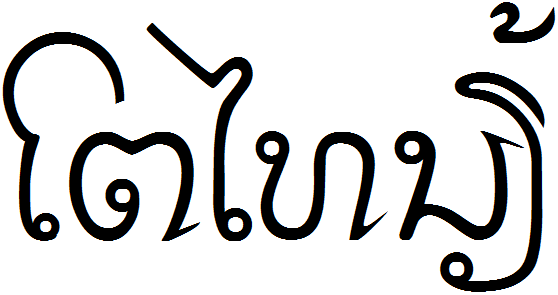
- Script type: Abugida
- Period: c. 1500–1930s (survives as the modern Lao script)
- Direction: Left-to-right
- Languages: Lao, Isan, and others

Related scripts
- Parent systems: Egyptian hieroglyphs: Phoenician; Aramaic; Brahmi; Tamil-Brahmi; Pallava; Old Khmer; Sukhothai; Fakkham; Tai Noi
- Child systems: Lao
- Sister systems: Tai Yo

The Tai Noi (Thai: อักษรไทน้อย, RTGS: akson thai noi; Northeastern Thai: อักษรลาวเดิม, RTGS: akson lao doem; Lao: ອັກສອນລາວບູຮານ, RTGS: akson lao buhan) also spelled Thai Noi or Lao Buhan script is a Brahmic script that has historically been used in Laos and Isan since about 1500 CE. The contemporary Lao script is a direct descendant and has preserved the basic letter shapes. The script has mostly dropped out of use in the Isan region of Thailand, due to the Thaification policies of the Thai government, that imposed Central Thai culture such as the Thai script throughout the country.

== Names ==
The Tai Noi script (Northeastern Thai: อักษรไทน้อย /ʔǎk.sɔ̆ːn tʰâj nɔ᷆ːj/ Akson Thai Noi, cf. Lao: ອັກສອນໄທນ້ອຍ Akson Thai Noy, lit. 'Little Tai alphabet') is also called To Lao (Northeastern Thai: โตลาว /tò lâːw/, cf. Lao: ໂຕລາວ /tòː láːw/, lit. 'Lao letters'), which in contemporary Isan and Lao would be Tua Lao (Northeastern Thai: ตัวลาว /tùa lâːw/ and Lao: ຕົວລາວ /tùa láːw/, respectively. The script is known in Laos as Lao Buhan (Lao: ລາວບູຮານ /láːw bùː.hán/), which means lit. 'ancient Lao'. In Laos, the script is referred to in academic settings as the Akson Lao Doem (Lao: ອັກສອນລາວເດີມ /ʔák.sɔ̆ːn láːw dɤ̀ːm/ Akson Lao Deum, cf. Northeastern Thai: อักษรลาวเดิม, lit. 'Original Lao script'). The script is also called Tua Wiang, meaning "orthography of the court".

== History ==
The Tai Noi/Lao script and the Thai script derive from a common ancestral Tai script of what is now northern Thailand which was an adaptation of the Khmer script, rounded by the influence of the Mon script, all of which are descendants of the Pallava script of southern India. The Fak Kham script represents the prototype for the Tai Noi script, which was developed in Lan Xang. The first true examples of inscriptions in Tai Noi are provided by a stele found in Thakhek, dated to 1497.

The 16th century would see the establishment of many of the hallmarks of the contemporary Lao language. Scribes abandoned the use of written Khmer or Lao written in the Khmer alphabet, adopting a simplified, cursive form of the script now known in Thailand as Tai Noi. The spread of Theravada Buddhism spread literacy, as monks served as teachers, teaching reading and writing as well other basic skills to village boys, and the Tai Noi script was the secular script used for personal letters, record-keeping and signage, as well as to record short stories and the klon (Northeastern Thai: กลอน /klɔ̄ːn/, cf. Lao: ກອນ /kɔ̀ːn/ kon) poetry that were often incorporated into traditional folksongs. The earliest evidence of the script in what is now Thailand is an inscription at Prathat Si Bunrueang in Nong Bua Lamphu dated to 1510, and the last epigraphic evidence is dated to 1840 AD, although large numbers of texts were destroyed or did not survive the heat and humidity. Temples built in what is now Isan still featured the Tai Noi script on its murals and although Siam would intervene in some matters, daily administration was still left to the remaining kings and various Lao princes that served as governors of the larger mueang.

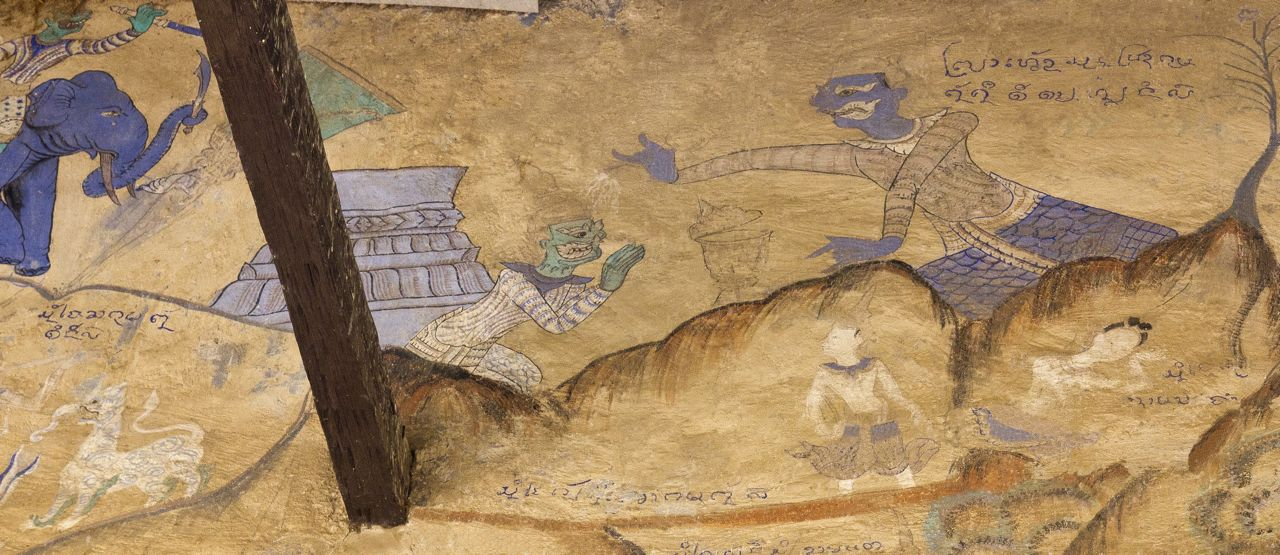
Temple mural of Wat Photaram in Maha Sarakham Province. Dating to the reign of Siamese Ruler Rama III (1788–1851), the writing is in the Tai Noi script

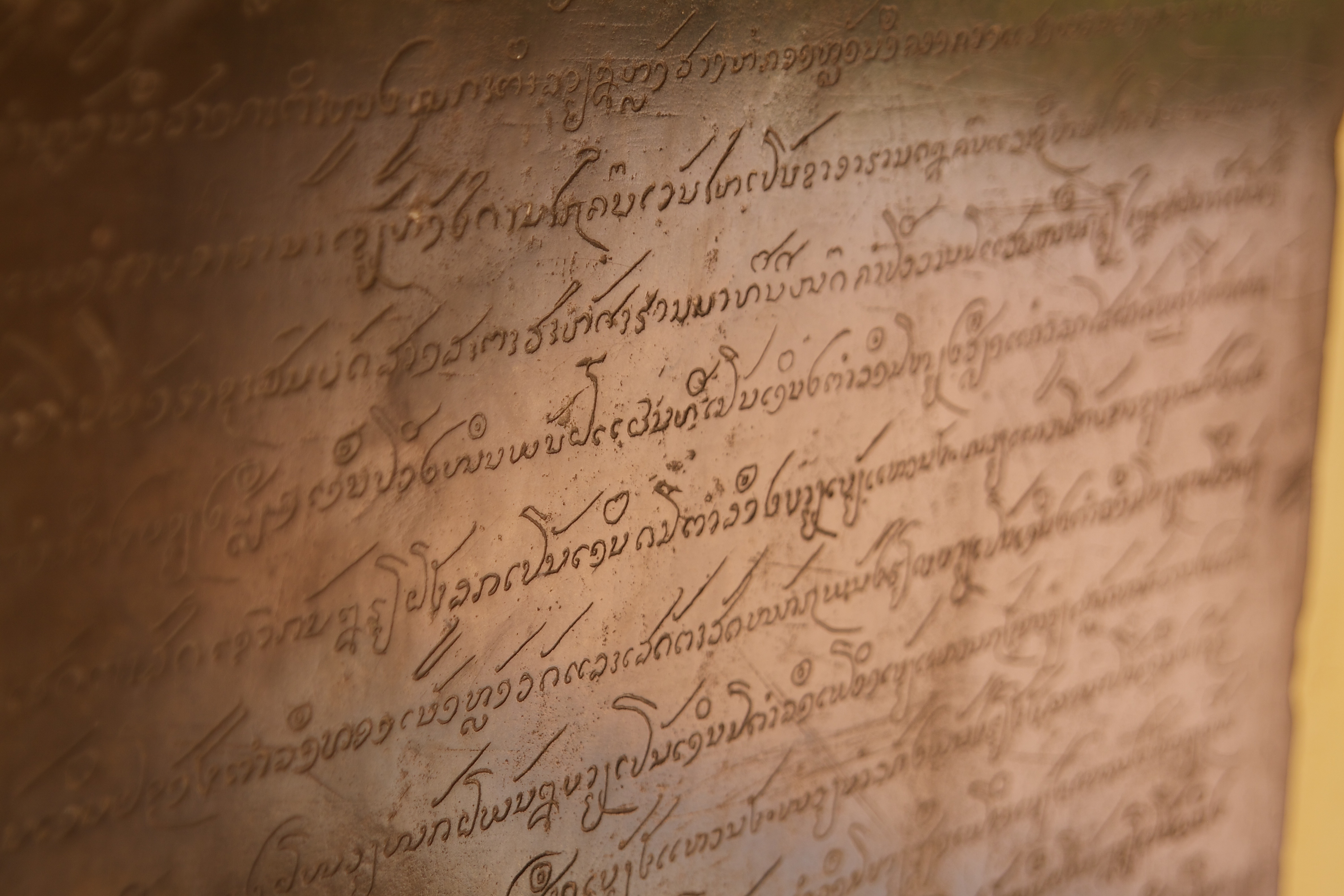
Inscription in Lao Buhan which records the construction, decoration and opening of Wat Sahasahatsarama or Wat Si Saket, Vientiane. Completed 1824.

The use of the script was banned in Isan in 1871 by royal decree and supplemented with the Thai alphabet, followed by reforms that imposed Thai as the administrative language of the region in 1898, but these edicts had little impact as education was done informally by village monks. The written language survived to some degree until the imposition of the radical Thaification policies of the 1930s, as the Central Thai culture was elevated as the national standard and all expressions of regional and minority culture were brutally suppressed. Many documents were confiscated and burned, religious literature was replaced by royally sanctioned Thai versions and schools, where only the Thai spoken and written language was used, were built in the region. As a result, only a handful of people, such as academic experts, monks that maintain the temple libraries and some elderly people of advanced age are familiar with and can read material written in Tai Noi script. This has led to Isan being mainly a spoken language, and when it is written, if at all, it is written in the Thai script and spelling conventions that distance it from its Lao origins.

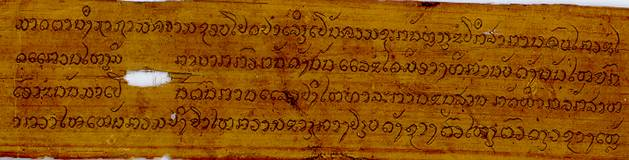
Portions of an ancient legal text written in the Tai Noi script on a palm-leaf manuscript. The script was banned in the 1930s but survived in Laos as the modern Lao alphabet.

In Laos, Tai Noi survives with a few modifications as the Lao script. The Lao script is a direct descendant of Tai Noi and continues its role as the official written language of the Lao language of the left bank as well as the script used to transcribe minority languages. In Isan, increased exposure to Tai Noi has been provided by the Khon Kaen University's Isan language and literature BA courses, as of 2004. In addition, the Mahachulalongkorn University in Khon Kaen has independently developed the "New Thai Noi" script, which includes a 5-tone diacritic system to simplify the script for students wishing to read and write Tai Noi. In 2012, the Khon Kaen University developed the four-year Isan Culture Maintenance and Revitalization Programme (ICMRP), which addresses the development of an Isan language curriculum in order to revitalize the language. The Tai Noi script was selected as the writing system for the project due to its historical use for secular writings, as well as for its widespread use in Isan prior to the introduction of the Thai education system. The main outcomes of the program were the first officially approved Isan language curriculum for primary and secondary school students, the first municipal multilingual Thai-Isan-English road signage (featuring Tai Noi) in Northeast Thailand, children's tracing books for learning Tai Noi script, a standardized Tai Noi script presented in alphabet posters, flash cards for teaching Tai Noi and a 16,000-word multilingual Thai-Isan-English dictionary employing the Tai Noi script.

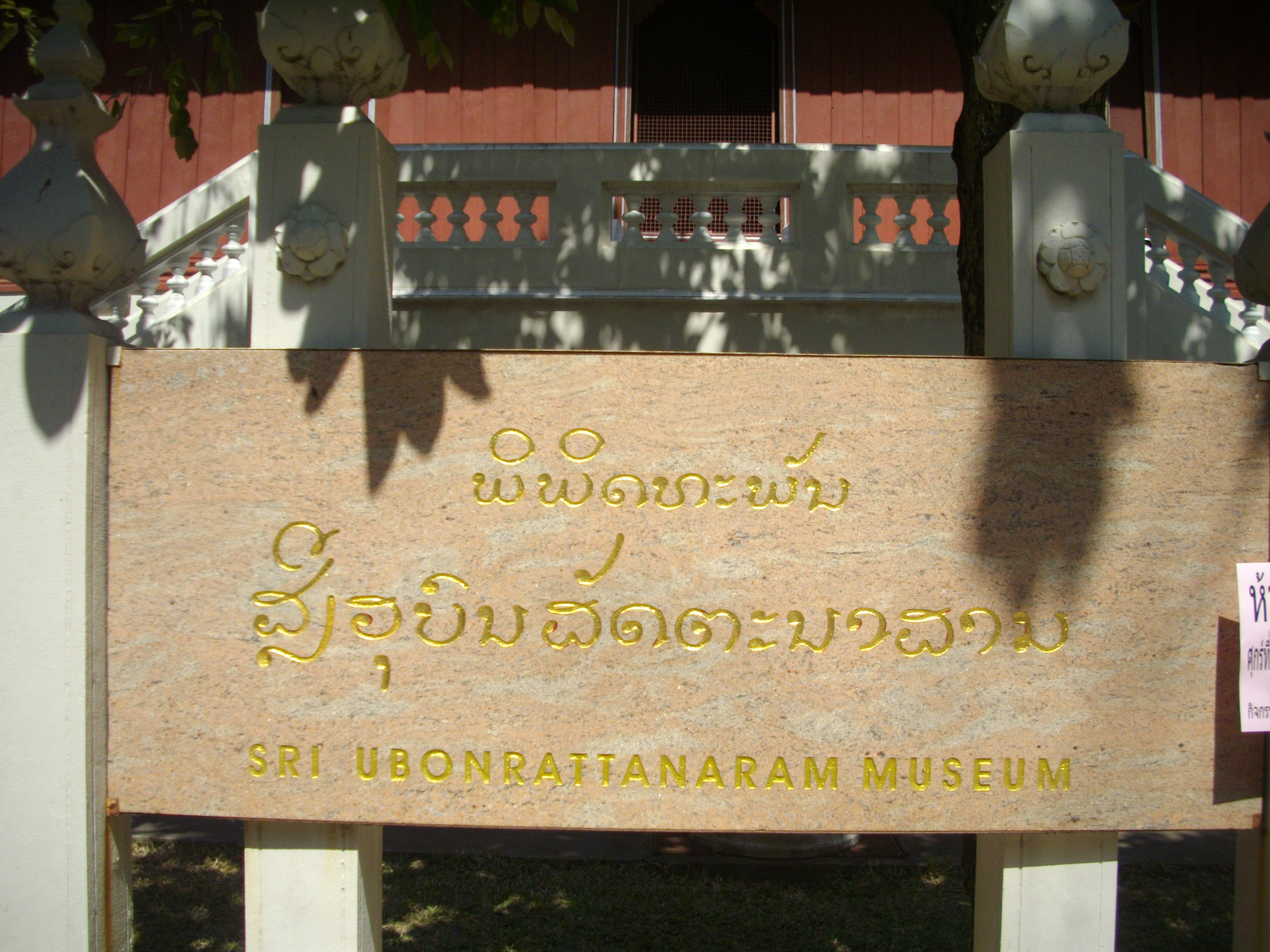
'Sri Ubon Rattanaram Museum' written in English and Isan in the Tai Noi script. This would be rendered as Northeastern Thai: พิพิธภัณฑ์ศรีอุบลรัตนาราม in the Thai script, identical to how it is in the Thai language, and Lao: ພິພິດທະພັນສີອຸບົນຣັດຕະນາຣາມ in the contemporary Lao.

== Characteristics ==
The Tai Noi consonants are written horizontally from left to right, while vowels are written in front, on top, at the bottom, and after the letter, depending on the vowel. The script does not have capital or lowercase letters. There are no spaces between words. Sentences are ended with a space.

The Tai Noi script has its own numbers, which are similar to numbers found in the Lao script.

=== Consonants ===
The Tai Noi script contains 27 initial consonants.

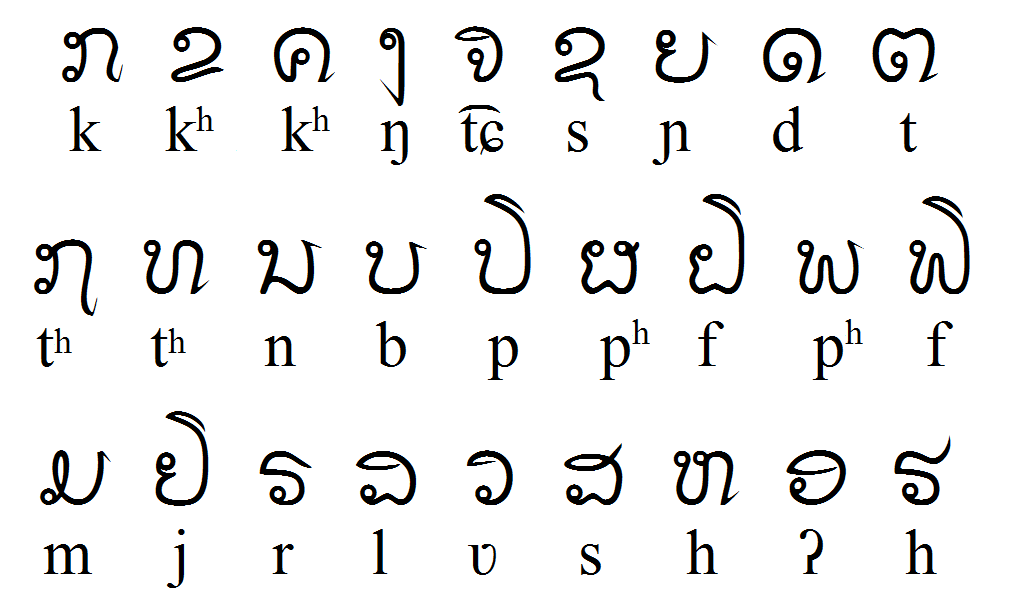

=== Consonant clusters ===
Consonant clusters are initial consonants that consist of two consonant letters combined into one letter.

The following picture illustrates some examples:

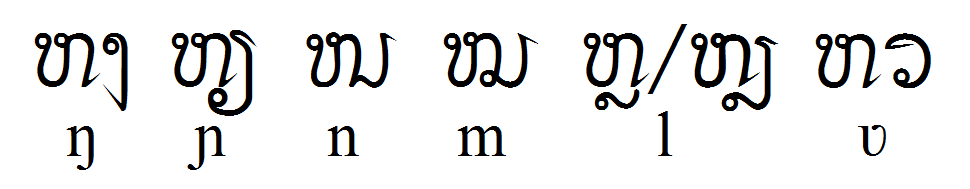

=== Final consonants ===
The Tai Noi script contains letters specifically for consonants in the final position of a word. There are 11 final consonant letters in total for 8 different sounds.

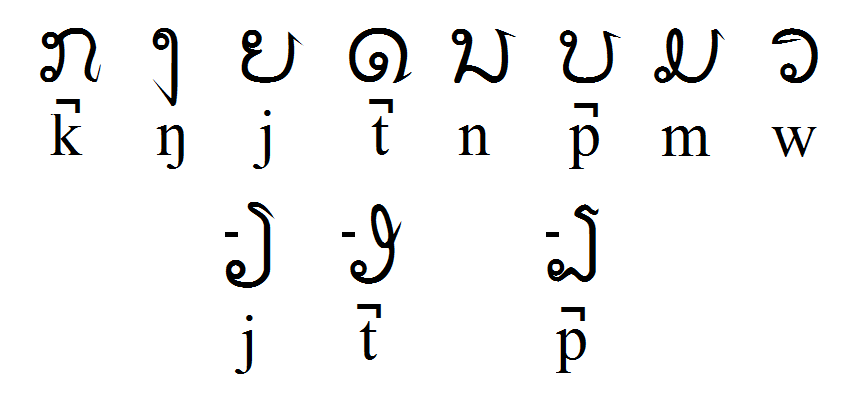

=== Vowels ===
The Tai Noi script contains 29 vowels formed by numerous diacritics.

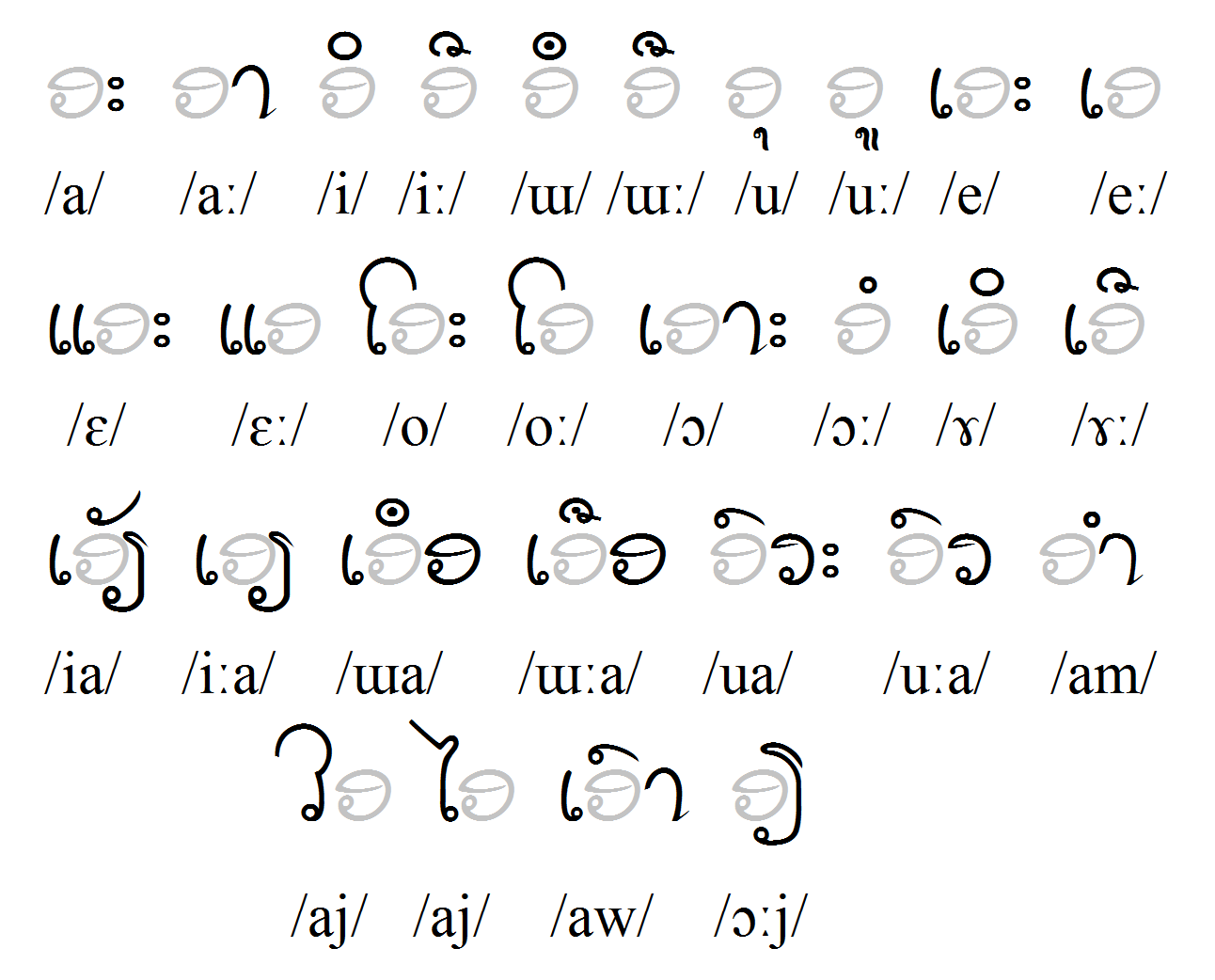

== Unicode ==
Attempts to encode Tai Noi in Unicode have been made.

== Fonts ==
You can download a Tai Noi font at the IsanGate website.
