= Sukhothai script =

Brahmic script, ancestor of Thai writing

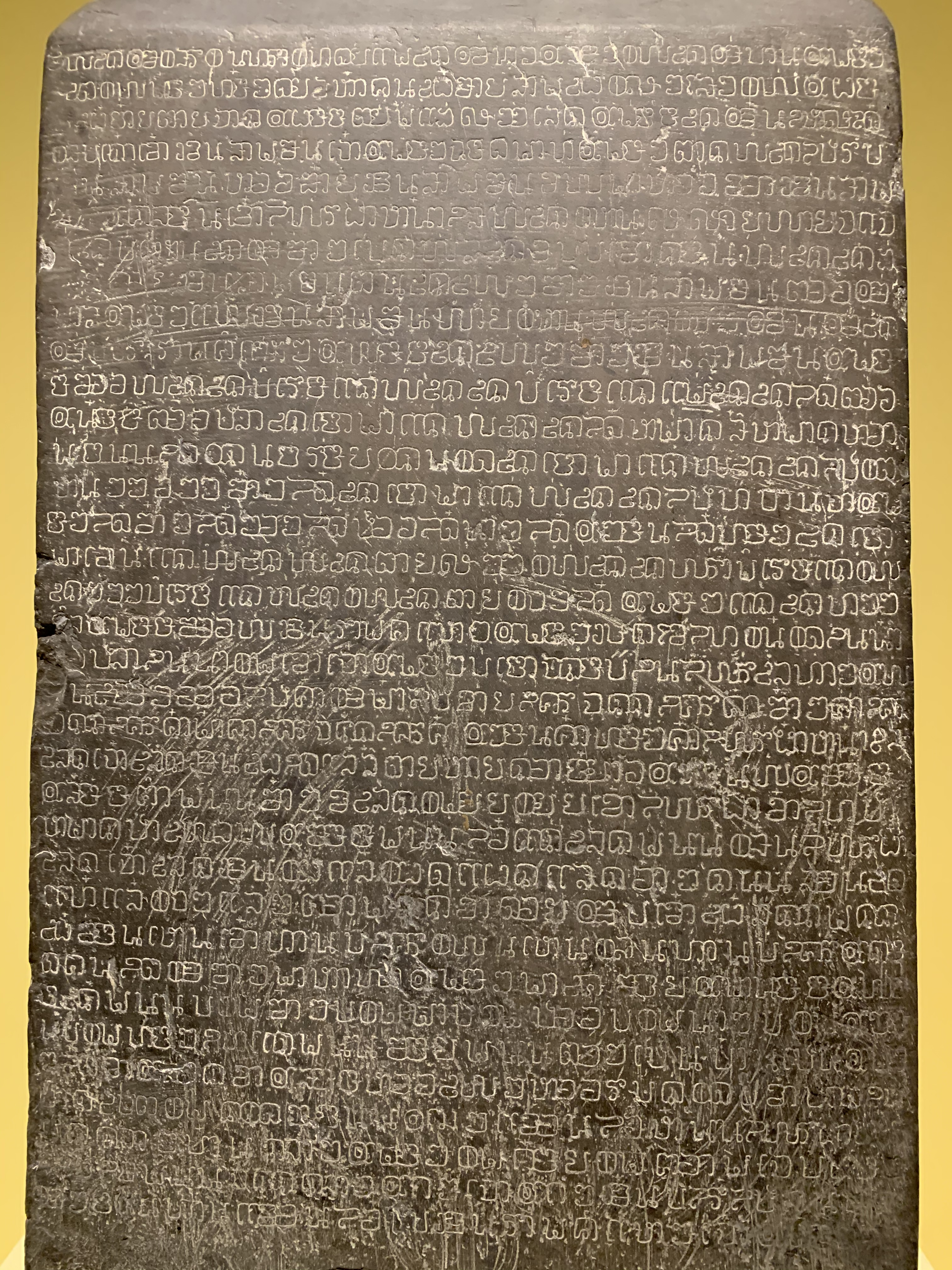
- Script type: Abugida
- Creator: Ram Khamhaeng
- Period: c. 1283 CE – 15th century
- Direction: Left-to-right
- Languages: Thai, Lao, Lanna, and others

Related scripts
- Parent systems: Proto-Sinaitic alphabet: Phoenician alphabet; Aramaic alphabet; Brāhmī; Tamil-Brahmi; Pallava; Old Khmer; Sukhothai script
- Child systems: Thai, Fakkham
- Sister systems: Khom Thai, Lai Tay

The Sukhothai script, also known as the proto-Thai script and Ram Khamhaeng alphabet, is a Brahmic script which originated in the Sukhothai Kingdom. The script is found on the Ram Khamhaeng Inscription and the Lö Thai Inscription.

== History ==
=== Origin ===
The Sukhothai script was based on a cursive form of Khmer script, which was formed by dissections, truncations and removal of flourishes from the original Khmer script. Scholar Michel Ferlus has demonstrated that certain peculiarities of ancient and modern Tai scripts can only be explained by inadequacies and gaps in the ancient Khmer script, in particular the pre-Angkorian Khmer script. The Sukhothai script is first attested on the Ram Khamhaeng stele, which is dated between 1283 and 1290, but it is the result of the modification of an unattested pre-existing script, based on the Khmer script. Ferlus theorizes that the pre-existing script may have developed during the pre-Angkorian period (7th–8th centuries), which would be about four centuries earlier than current certainties. However, another possibility is that a pre-Angkorian version of the Khmer script may have lasted for some time on the outskirts of Khmer civilization. In turn, this script would be used by the Tais, and changed to fit the language and its phonetics. According to Thai tradition the Sukhothai script was created in 1283 by King Ramkhamhaeng the Great (Thai: พ่อขุนรามคำแหงมหาราช).

Ferlus divides the Tai scripts of Khmer origin into two groups: the central scripts, consisting of ancient (Sukhothai, Fakkham) and modern (Thai, Lao) scripts, and the peripheral scripts of the Tai of Vietnam (Tai Dam, Tai Don, Tai Daeng, Tai Yo and Lai Pao script). Ferlus suggest that the Tai peoples all adopted the same first model of writing borrowed from the Khmers, by simple contact during exchanges, without proper learning. Subsequently, the Tai migrated soon migrated throughout large parts of Southeast Asia. The Tai that headed south (becoming known as the Thais or Siamese), slipped within the borders of the Angkorian domain, where they founded the Sukhothai Kingdom. The primitive Tai script would, in turn, take on more proper aspects of standardized Khmer, resulting in the Sukhothai script. Features like alphabetical order and numerals were borrowed from the Khmer script. Certain vowel symbols changed value so that there is no reading contradiction between the Thai and Khmer languages. The peripheral scripts still retain many characteristics of the primitive script, such as pre-Angkorian sound values of certain letters, a lack of alphabetical order and a lack of numerals. According to Anthony Diller, the innovations found in the Sukhothai script as compared to the Khmer script, indicate that the script was a planned and unified system.

=== Spread and descendants ===
After its creation, the Sukhothai script spread to the Tai kingdoms of Lan Chang (Laos), Lanna and Ayutthaya. The oldest Sukhothai inscription found at Lampang (Lanna) is almost identical to the earliest ones found at Sukhothai. The inscription originated in Lamphun, but was drawn by a Sukhothai monk, who probably introduced the Suhkhothai script to Lanna. The script transformed somewhat over time as it spread throughout the region to the north and south. According to Finot (1959), the earliest example of the Sukhothai script found in Luang Prabang dates from 1548 A.D., 265 years after the Ram Khamhaeng inscription.

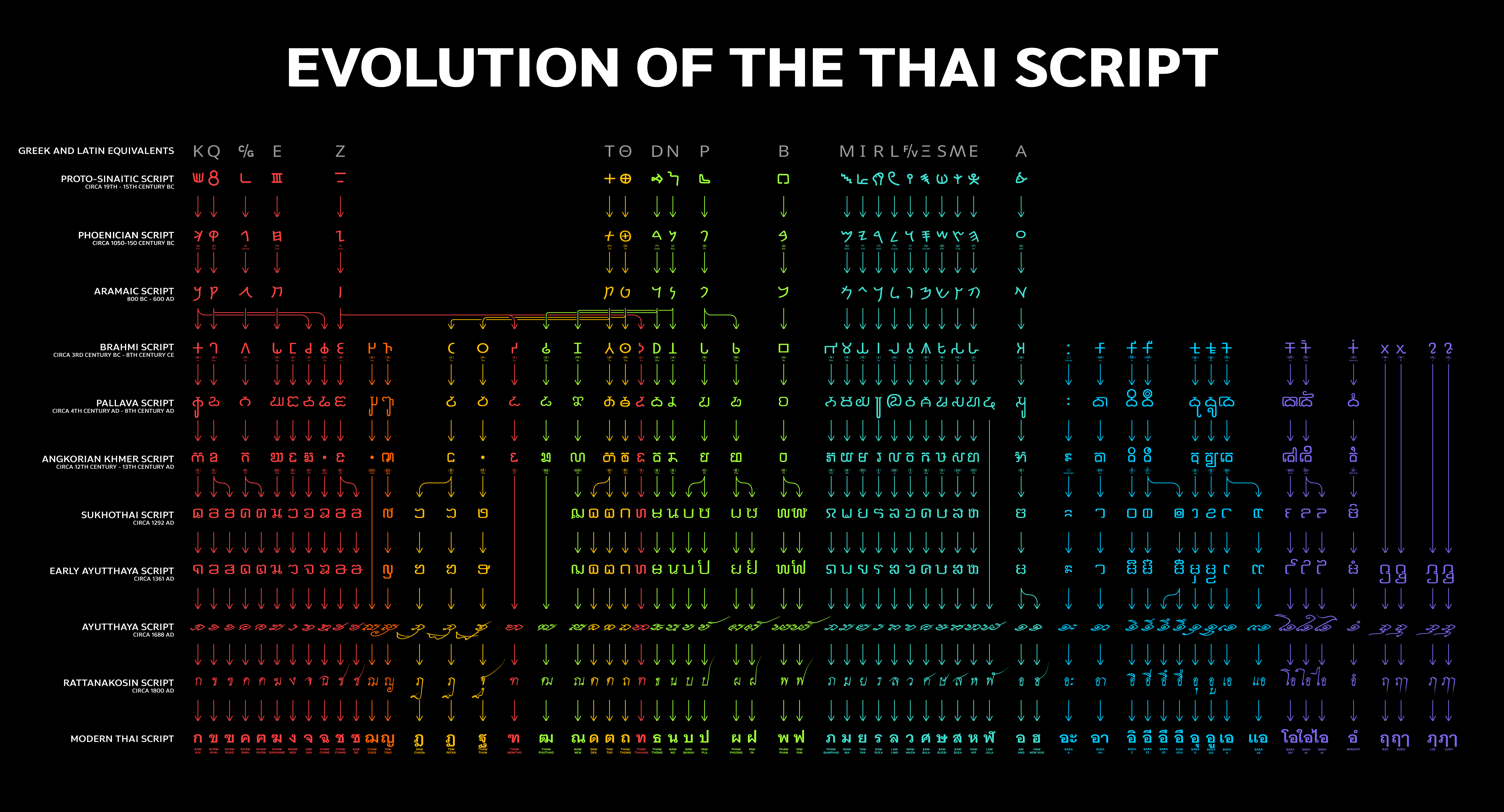
The evolution of the Sukhothai script into the modern Thai script.

The Sukhothai script changed little as it spread southward, as today's modern Thai script has changed remarkably little from the Sukhothai script. The Sukhothai script developed into the Thai script in the lower basin of the Chao Phraya River, as this development can be traced over the course of the following centuries. During King Lithai's reign in the late 14th century, literate individuals were still familiar with the Khmer script and therefore refused to write in the Sukhothai script. To address this, the script was modified to more closely resemble the Khmer script in the way vowels are written. The changes that were introduced resulted in a new script in 1375, called the "King Li Thai script". This script wrote vowel signs above, below, before or after an initial consonant. In 1680 this script was succeeded by the "King Narai script", which has been developed and preserved as the modern Thai script of today.

In the north, the script changed more considerably as it evolved into the Fakkham script. The Fakkham script was used extensively in the Lanna Kingdom between the beginning of the 15th century and the end of the 16th century. The letters of the Fakkham script became elongated and somewhat more angular rather than square and perpendicular as its ancestor the Sukhothai script. Several letters had noticeable "tails" extending above and below the main writing line.

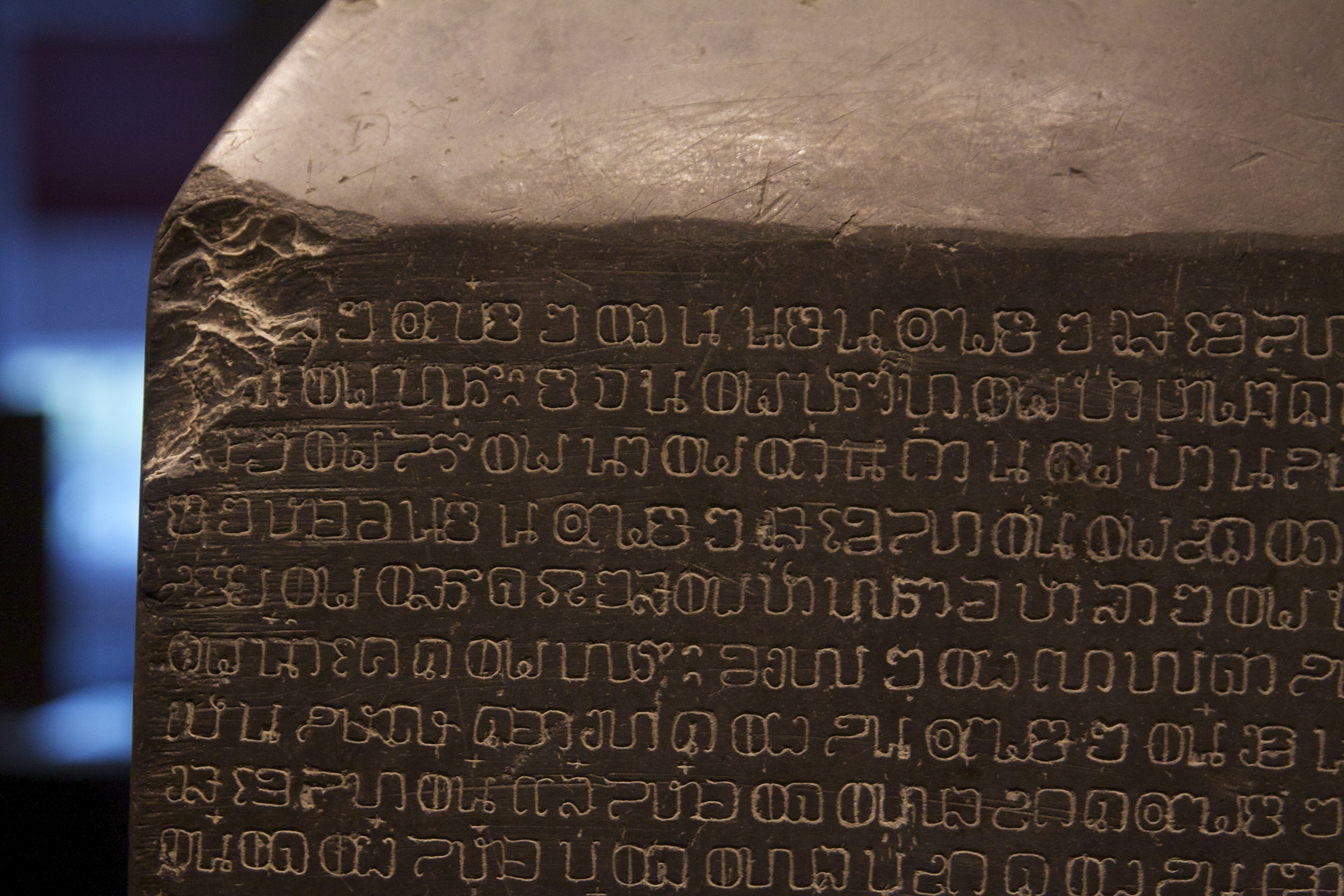
Detail from Ramkhamhaeng inscription

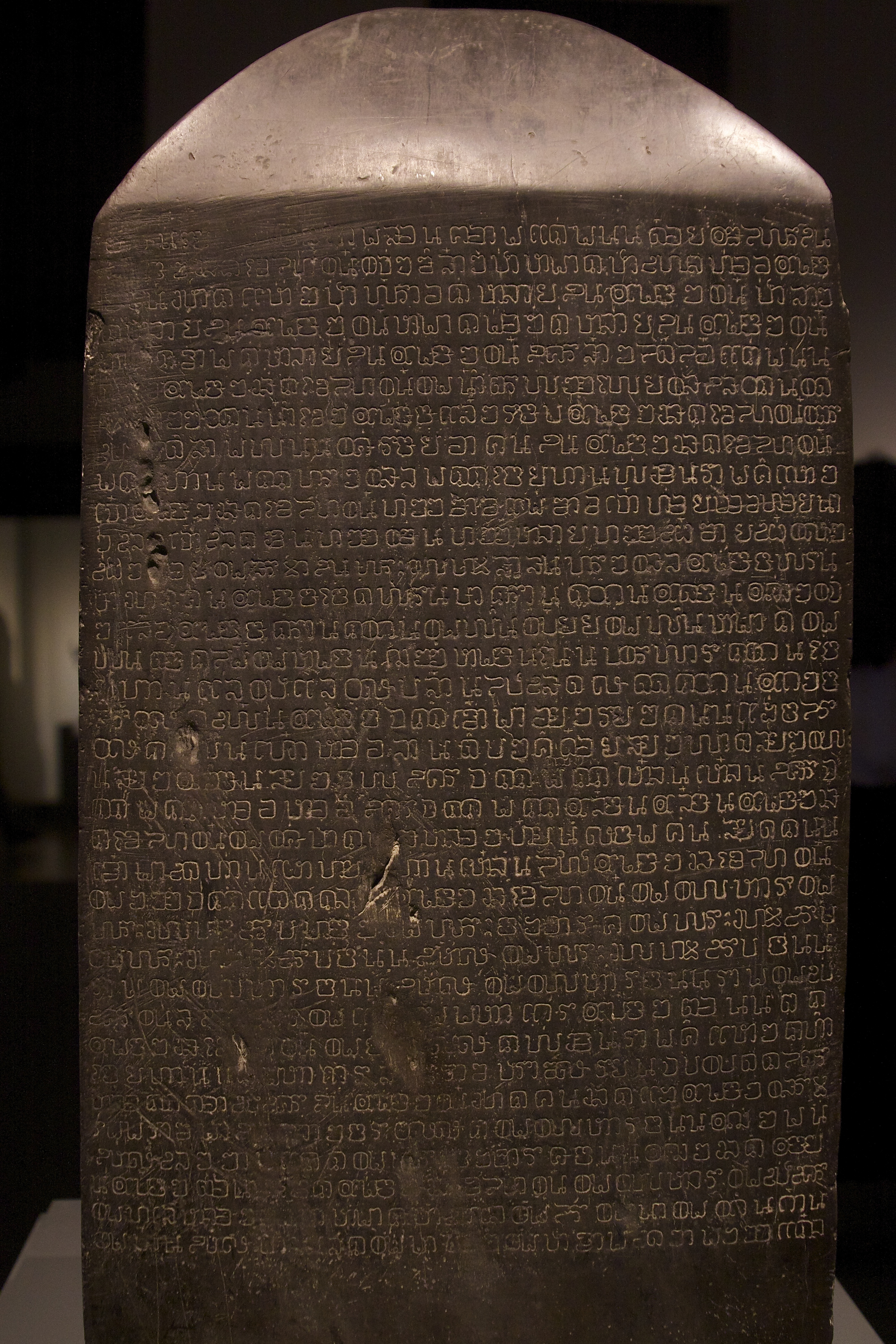
The Ramkhamhaeng inscription

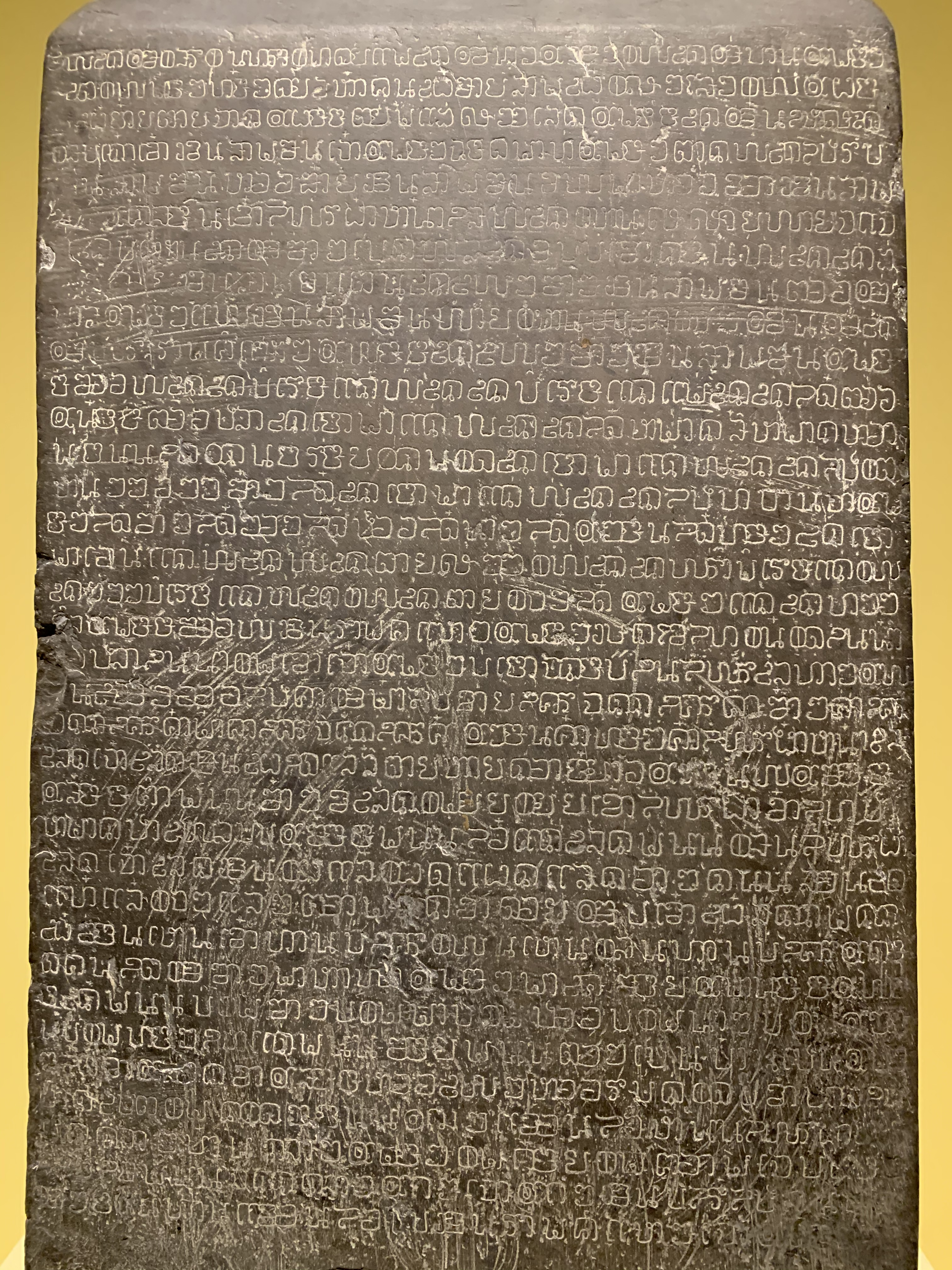
The Ramkhamhaeng inscription

== Characteristics ==
The Sukhothai script was written from left to right. The script did not employ wordspacing, capitalization or full stops at the end of sentences. The script had 39 consonant symbols. The Sukhothai script introduced four innovations compared to the Khmer script. The first innovation is the introduction of several new letters to accommodate Tai phonemic contrasts not made by the Khmer script. These include /e/ and /ae/, /pʰ/ and /f/, and /kʰ/ and /x/. The new letters were created by modifying letters used for similar sounds, by adding for example tails or indentations to the letters. The Sukhothai script is considered to be the first script in the world that introduced tone markers to indicate distinctive tones, which are lacking in the Mon-Khmer (Austroasiatic languages) and Indo-Aryan languages that used scripts ancestral to Sukhothai. Another addition were consonant clusters that were written horizontally and contiguously on one line, rather than writing the second consonant below the first one.

=== Consonants ===
Consonants
	ก [k]	ข [kʰ]	ฃ [x]	ค [g]	ฅ [ɣ]	ฆ [g]	ง [ŋ]
	จ [tɕ]	ฉ [tɕʰ]		ช [dʑ]	ซ [z~ʑ]	ฌ [tɕʰ] does not exist	ญ [ɲ]
ฎ [ʔd]	ฏ [t]	ฐ [tʰ]		ฑ [d] does not exist		ฒ [tʰ] does not exist	ณ [n]
ด [ʔd]	ต [t]	ถ [tʰ]		ท [d]		ธ [d]	น [n]
บ [ʔb]	ป [p]	ผ [pʰ]	ฝ [f]	พ [b]	ฟ [v]	ภ [b]	ม [m]
ย [j]	ร [r]	ล [l]	ว [w]	ศ [s]	ษ [s]	ส [s]	ห [h]
ฬ [l] does not exist	อ [ʔ]	ฮ [h] does not exist					

==== Digraphs ====
Digraphs
หง [ŋ̊]	หญ [ɲ̊]	หน [n̥]	หม [m̥]
หย [j̊]	หร [r̥]	หล [l̥]	หว [w̥]
อย [ʔj]			

=== Numerals ===
Below are the numerals of the Sukhothai script, which are theorized to be borrowed from the Khmer numerals.

Numbers
๐ 0	๑ 1	๒ 2	๓ 3	๔ 4
๕ 5	๖ 6	๗ 7	๘ 8	๙ 9

=== Vowels ===
The script wrote vowel marks on the main line, however this innovation fell out of use not long after. By the fifteenth century, in order to write all vowels, several new vowel diacritics were created and added to the original Sukhothai script. Vowels that had been treated as inherent vowels in the earlier script were later written as distinct signs.

Independent Vowel
Independent Vowel	IPA	Modern Equivalent	Sample Syllable
sara i สระอิ	[i]	อิ	อิก
sara ee (i) สระอี	[iː]	อี	อีก
sara eu (ue) สระอึ/สระอือ	[ɯ(ː)]	อึ, อือ	อืก

Dependent Vowel
Dependent Vowel	IPA	Modern Equivalent Example	Sample Open Syllable	Sample Closed Syllable
sara a สระอะ	[a]	กะ	กะ	กัน
sara ah (a) สระอา	[aː]	กา	กา	กาน
sara i สระอิ	[i]	กิ	กิ	กิน
sara ee (i) สระอี	[iː]	กี	กี	กีน
sara eu (ue) สระอึ/สระอือ	[ɯ(ː)]	กึ, กือ	กือ	กืน
sara u สระอุ	[u]	กุ	กุ	กุน
sara oo (u) สระอู	[uː]	กู	กู	กูน
sara e สระเอะ/สระเอ	[e(ː)]	เกะ, เก	เก	เกน
sara aeh (ae) สระแอะ	[ɛ]	แกะ	แกะ	
sara ae สระแอ	[ɛː]	แก	แก	แกน
sara o สระโอะ/สระโอ	[o(ː)]	โกะ, โก	โก	โกน
sara ai สระไอ	[aj]	ไก	ไก	
sara aeu (aue) สระใอ	[aɯ]	ใก	ใก	
sara aw (o) สระออ	[ɔː]	กอ	กอ	กอน
sara oe สระเออ	[ɤː]	เกอ	เกอ	เกิน
sara ia สระเอีย	[ia]	เกีย	เกืย	เกืยน
sara eua (uea) สระเอือ	[ɯa]	เกือ	เกือ	เกือน
sara ua สระอัว	[ua]	กัว	กัว	กวน
sara am สระอำ	[am]	กำ	กำ	

=== Diacritics ===
Diacritics	Function	Modern Equivalent	Example
	denotes the start of a text	๏	๏ กูกำ
	denotes the croaky tone	่	
	denotes the breathy tone	้	

== Sample Text ==
*ma˩ : low tone

*ma : mid tone

*ma˥ : high tone

Sukhothai Script	Modern Thai Transcribed	IPA Sukhothai	Meaning
	พ่กูชื่สรีอีนทราทีตยแม่กูชื่นางเสือง พี่กูชื่บานเมืองตูพี่น้องท้องดยว ห้าคนผู้ชายสามผู้ญิงโสงพี่เผือ ผู้อ้ายตายจากเผือตยมแฏ่ญงงเลก	bɔː˩ kuː dʑɯː˩ siː.ʔiːn.draː.diːt mɛː˩ kuː dʑɯː˩ naːŋ sɯaŋ biː˩ kuː dʑɯː˩ baːn.mɯaŋ tuː biː˩ nɔːŋ˥ dɔːŋ˥ ʔdiaw haː˥ gɔn pʰuː˥.dʑaːj saːm pʰuː˥.ɲiŋ soːŋ biː˩ pʰɯa pʰuː˥.ʔaːj˥ taːj tɕaːk pʰɯa tiam tɛː˩ ɲaŋ lek	My father's name is Sri Indraditya, My mother's name is lady Sueang. My older brother's name is Ban Mueang. We are five siblings from the same womb. three boys and two girls. Our eldest brother passed away. when we were young.... [text continues]
Modern Thai Approximate Pronunciation and Transliteration
บ่อ กู จื่อ ซีอีนดราดีต แหม่ กู จื่อ นางเซือง บี่ กู จื่อ บานเมือง ตู บี่ น่อง ด้อง เดียว ห้า กอน ผู้จาย ซาม ผู้ญิง โซง บี่ เบือ ผู้อ้าย ตาย จาก เพือ เตียม แต่ ญัง เล็ก bo ku jue Si-Indradit mae ku jue Nang Sueang bi ku jue Ban Mueang tu bi nong dong diao ha gon phujai sam phunying song bi phuea phu-ai tai chak phuea tiam tae nyang lek

== Bibliography ==
- Ferlus, Michel. Sur l'ancienneté des écritures thai d'origine indo-khmère (1999)
