= Lai Tay script =

Writing system used for the Tai Yo language of Vietnam

- The word "Tai Yo" written in the Lai Tay script
- Script type: Abugida
- Period: 16th century – present
- Direction: Top-to-bottom, right-to-left
- Languages: Tai Yo

Related scripts
- Parent systems: Egyptian hieroglyphs: Phoenician; Aramaic; Brahmi; Tamil-Brahmi; Pallava; Khmer; Sukhothai; Lai Tay script
- Sister systems: Tai Viet, Lao, Thai

ISO 15924
- ISO 15924: Tayo (380), Tai Yo

Unicode
- Unicode alias: Tai Yo
- Unicode range: U+1E6C0–U+1E6FF

The Lai Tay script (Vietnamese: Chữ Thái Lai Tay), is a writing system used by the Tai Yo people of Quỳ Châu District, to write the Tai Yo language.

== Names ==
The Lai Tay script means "the script of the Tai". It is also known by various other names such as the Yo Lai Tay script, Nge An script, Tai Yo script, Thai Lai Tay script, Quy Chau script.

== Origin ==
The scholar Ferlus classifies the Lai Tay script as a part of the Khmer family of writing systems, which the scholar divides into two groups: the central scripts consisting of the ancient Sukhothai and Fakkham scripts, which developed into the modern Thai and Lao scripts, and the peripheral scripts of the Tai peoples of Vietnam, which include the Tai Dam, Tai Don, Tai Daeng, Lai Tay and Lai Pao scripts. Ferlus suggests that the Tai peoples all adopted the same first model of writing borrowed from the Khmers, by simple contact during exchanges, without proper learning. Subsequently, the Tai migrated and occupied a large part of Southeast Asia. The peripheral scripts still retain many characteristics of the primitive Khmer-borrowed script, such as pre-Angkorian sound values of certain letters, a lack of alphabetical order and a lack of numerals. The scripts used by the Tai peoples of Vietnam arrived there as early as the 16th century.

== Characteristics ==
The Lai Tay script has 29 consonants, of which 8 can occur in the syllable final position. The script has 13 vowel signs, which are placed below the consonant for most vowels, or to the right of the consonant for a few other vowels. Unlike other Tai writing systems, the Lai Tay script has remained a true abugida, and consonants written without a vowel sign are pronounced with the inherent vowel <o>, [ɔ]. The script contains 9 ligatures for vowel and final consonant combinations.

The script is written vertically from top to bottom and horizontally from right to left on the model of Chinese writing. This innovation, which is unique in southeast Asia, is very well explained by the influence of Chinese writing; Tai scholars found it more convenient, when translating between Tai and Chinese, to adopt the same writing direction for both scripts. The outline of the Lai Tay script is very different from the neighboring scripts and the old type which served as a model for the verticalized type is no longer known.

The Lai Tay script does not contain any tone markers. The script is mostly written without any punctuation marks, but they might be found in some manuscripts, where they are the same as traditional Chinese punctuation marks. The script does not contain any numerals, and numbers were traditionally spelled out.

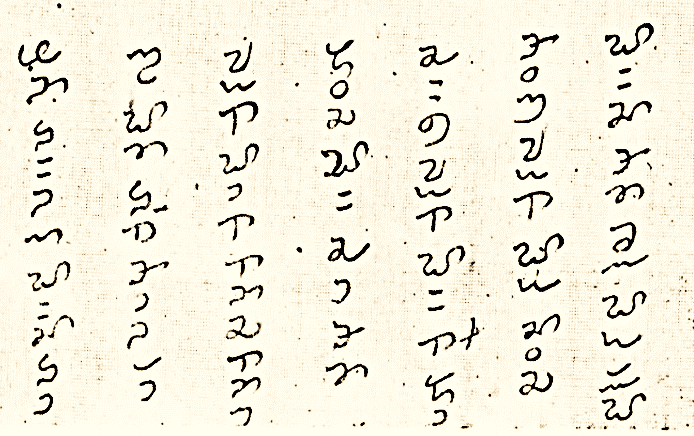
Text in the Lai Tay script

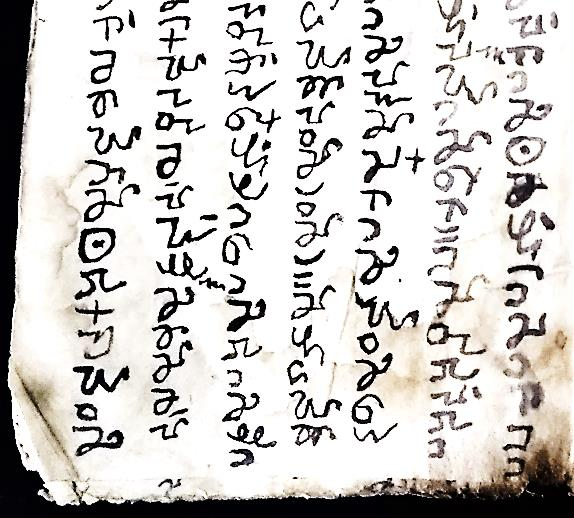
Excerpt from a Lai Tay manuscript

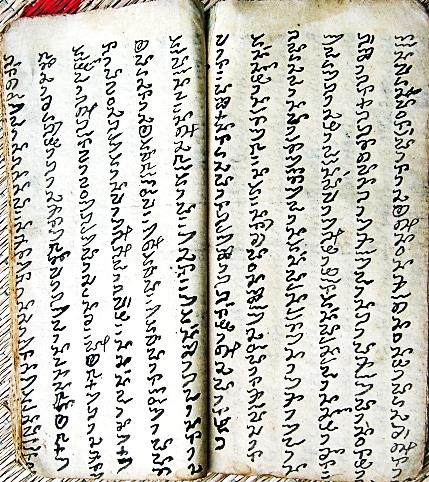
Manuscript written in the Lai Tay script

== Usage ==
The Lai Tay script is now out of common use, but there are enough manuscripts to allow linguistic study. Some very old Tai Yo scholars can still read the manuscripts. Manuscripts are preserved in both private and in personal collections. The script is now being taught and studied by the Tai Yo community, with the support of the local government and teachers.

== Unicode ==
Lai Tay script was added to the Unicode Standard in September 2025 with the release of version 17.0.

The Unicode block for Lai Tay script, called Tai Yo, is U+1E6C0–U+1E6FF:

Tai Yo^{[1]}^{[2]} Official Unicode Consortium code chart (PDF)
	0	1	2	3	4	5	6	7	8	9	A	B	C	D	E	F
U+1E6Cx	𞛀	𞛁	𞛂	𞛃	𞛄	𞛅	𞛆	𞛇	𞛈	𞛉	𞛊	𞛋	𞛌	𞛍	𞛎	𞛏
U+1E6Dx	𞛐	𞛑	𞛒	𞛓	𞛔	𞛕	𞛖	𞛗	𞛘	𞛙	𞛚	𞛛	𞛜	𞛝	𞛞	
U+1E6Ex	𞛠	𞛡	𞛢	𞛣	𞛤	𞛥	𞛦	𞛧	𞛨	𞛩	𞛪	𞛫	𞛬	𞛭	𞛮	𞛯
U+1E6Fx	𞛰	𞛱	𞛲	𞛳	𞛴	𞛵									𞛾	𞛿
Notes 1.As of Unicode version 17.0 2.Grey areas indicate non-assigned code points
