= Brahmic scripts =

Family of abugida writing systems

Brāhmī written in the Brahmi script, the shared ancestor of the Brahmic family of writing systems

The Brahmic scripts, also known as Indic scripts, are a family of abugida writing systems. They are descended from the Brahmi script of ancient India and are used by various languages in several language families in South, East, Central and Southeast Asia: Indo-Aryan, Dravidian, Tibeto-Burman, Turkic, Mongolic, Austroasiatic, Austronesian, and Tai. They were also the source of the dictionary order (gojūon) of Japanese kana.

== History ==
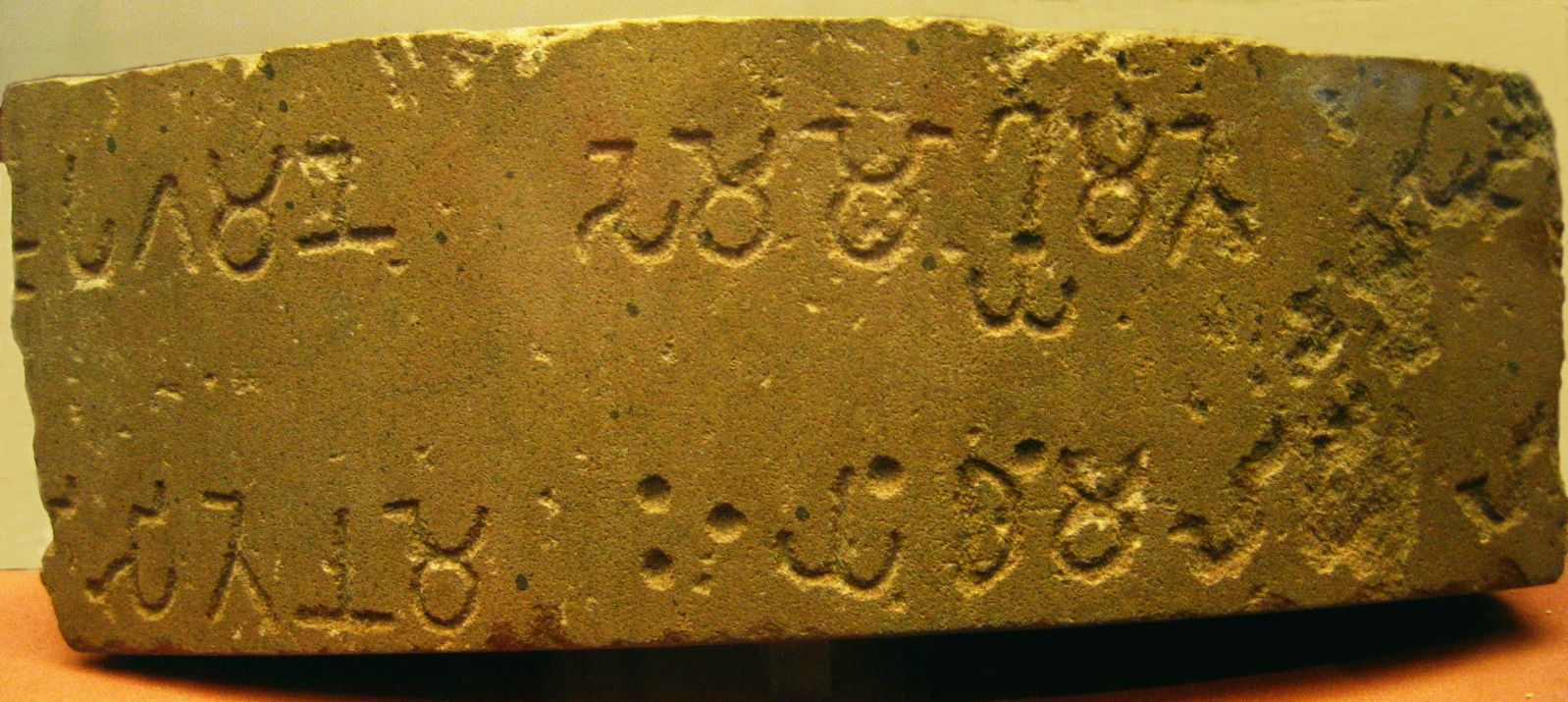
A fragment of Ashoka's 6th pillar edict, in Brahmi, the ancestor of all Brahmic scripts

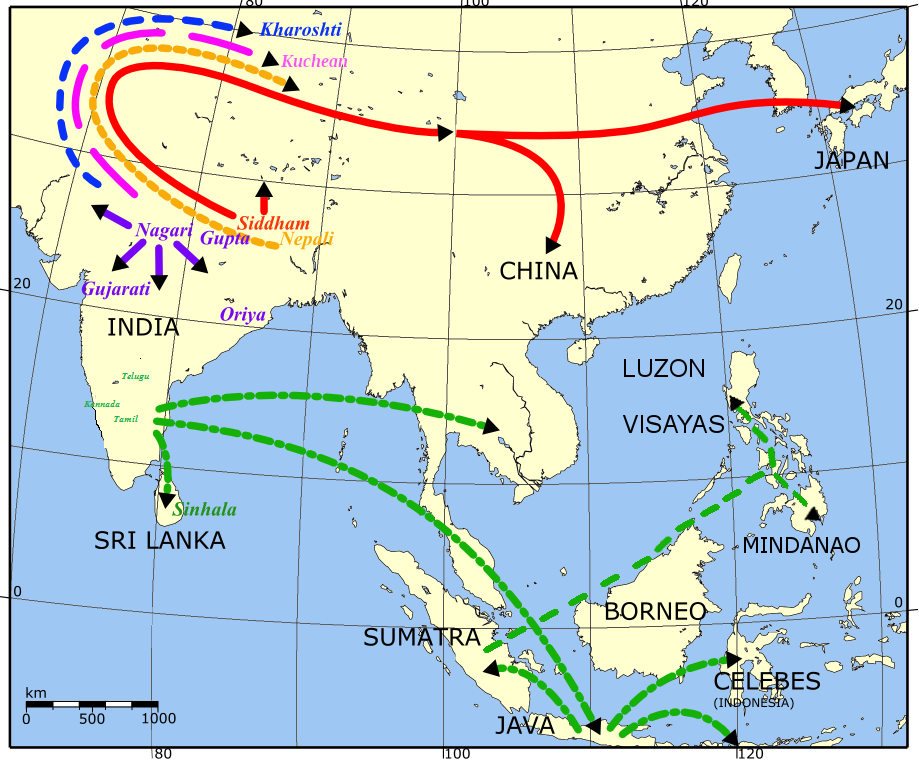
Spread of Brahmic family of scripts (and Kharosthi) from the subcontinent

Brahmic scripts descended from the Brahmi script. Brahmi is clearly attested from the 3rd century BCE during the reign of Ashoka, who used the script for imperial edicts. Northern Brahmi gave rise to the Gupta script during the Gupta period, which in turn diversified into a number of cursives during the medieval period. Notable examples of such medieval scripts, developed by the 7th or 8th century, include Nagari, Siddham and Sharada.

The Siddhaṃ script was especially important in Buddhism, as many sutras were written in it. The art of Siddham calligraphy survives today in Japan. The tabular presentation and dictionary order of the modern kana system of Japanese writing is believed to be descended from the Indic scripts, most likely through the spread of Buddhism.

Southern Brahmi evolved into the Kadamba, Pallava and Vatteluttu scripts, which in turn diversified into other scripts of South India and Southeast Asia. Brahmic scripts spread in a peaceful manner, Indianization, or the spread of Indian learning. The scripts spread naturally to Southeast Asia, at ports on trading routes. At these trading posts, ancient inscriptions have been found in Sanskrit, using scripts that originated in India. At first, inscriptions were made in Indian languages, but later the scripts were used to write the local Southeast Asian languages. Hereafter, local varieties of the scripts were developed. By the 8th century, the scripts had diverged and separated into regional scripts.

Evolution of the Brahmi script
	k-	kh-	g-	gh-	ṅ-	c-	ch-	j-	jh-	ñ-	ṭ-	ṭh-	ḍ-	ḍh-	ṇ-	t-	th-	d-	dh-	n-	p-	ph-	b-	bh-	m-	y-	r-	l-	v-	ś-	ṣ-	s-	h-
Ashoka	𑀓	𑀔	𑀕	𑀖	𑀗	𑀘	𑀙	𑀚	𑀛	𑀜	𑀝	𑀞	𑀟	𑀠	𑀡	𑀢	𑀣	𑀤	𑀥	𑀦	𑀧	𑀨	𑀩	𑀪	𑀫	𑀬	𑀭	𑀮	𑀯	𑀰	𑀱	𑀲	𑀳
Girnar																														𑀰	𑀱		
Kushana																																	
Gujarat																																	
Gupta																																	
Pallava																																	

== Characteristics ==
The figure shows how syllables are placed in two Brahmic scripts with analogy using the Latin script.

Some characteristics, which are present in most but not all the scripts, are:

- Each consonant has an inherent vowel which is usually a short ‘ə’ (in Bengali, Assamese and Odia, the phoneme is /ɔ/ due to sound shifts). Other vowels are written by adding to the character. A mark, known in Sanskrit as a virama/halanta/hasanta, can be used to indicate the absence of an inherent vowel, although it is rarely used.
- Each vowel has two forms, an independent form when not attached to a consonant, and a dependent form, when attached to a consonant. Depending on the script, the dependent forms can be either placed to the left of, to the right of, above, below, or on both the left and the right sides of the base consonant.
- Consonants (up to 4 in Devanagari) can be combined in ligatures. Special marks are added to denote the combination of 'r' with another consonant.
- Nasalization and aspiration of a consonant's dependent vowel is also noted by separate signs.
- The alphabetical order is: vowels, velar consonants, palatal consonants, retroflex consonants, dental consonants, bilabial consonants, approximants, sibilants, and other consonants. Each consonant grouping had four stops (with all four possible values of voicing and aspiration), and a nasal consonant.

== Comparison ==
Below are comparison charts of several of the major Indic scripts, organised on the principle that glyphs in the same column all derive from the same Brahmi glyph. Accordingly:

- The charts are not comprehensive. Glyphs may be unrepresented if they are later inventions not derived from any Brahmi character.
- The pronunciations of glyphs in the same column may not be identical. The pronunciation row is only representative; the International Phonetic Alphabet (IPA) pronunciation is given for Sanskrit where possible, or another language if necessary.

The transliteration is indicated in ISO 15919.

=== Consonants ===
This list tries to include characters of same origins, not same sounds.

ISO	ka	kha	ga	gha	ṅa	ca	cha	ja	jha	ña	ṭa	ṭha	ḍa	ḍha	ṇa	ta	tha	da	dha	na	ṉa	pa	pha/fa	ba	bha	ma	ya	ẏa	ra	ṟa	la	ḷa	ḻa	va	śa	ṣa	sa	ha	kṣa	ṯa
Ashoka Brahmi	𑀓	𑀔	𑀕	𑀖	𑀗	𑀘	𑀙	𑀚	𑀛	𑀜	𑀝	𑀞	𑀟	𑀠	𑀡	𑀢	𑀣	𑀤	𑀥	𑀦		𑀧	𑀨	𑀩	𑀪	𑀫	𑀬		𑀭		𑀮	𑀴		𑀯	𑀰	𑀱	𑀲	𑀳		
Devanagari	क	ख	ग	घ	ङ	च	छ	ज	झ	ञ	ट	ठ	ड	ढ	ण	त	थ	द	ध	न	ऩ	प	फ	ब	भ	म	य	य़	र	ऱ	ल	ळ	ऴ	व	श	ष	स	ह	क्ष	
Bengali–Assamese (Note: In Bengali, র is pronounced as rô, but it was originally va, which is still used for the wa sound in Mithilakshar, and modern Assamese ৱ (wabbô) was derived from middle Assamese র (wô). Compare with জ (ja) য (ya) and য় (ẏ) which are pronounced as jô, jô and e̯ô in Bengali and zô, zô and yô in Assamese, respectively. য is related to Devanagari य (ya), and it is still pronounced ya in Mithilakshar. Since their sounds shifted, the dots were added to keep the original sounds.)	ক	খ	গ	ঘ	ঙ	চ	ছ	জ	ঝ	ঞ	ট	ঠ	ড	ঢ	ণ	ত	থ	দ	ধ	ন		প	ফ	ব	ভ	ম	য	য়	র,ৰ		ল			ৱ	শ	ষ	স	হ	ক্ষ	
Sharada	𑆑	𑆒	𑆓	𑆔	𑆕	𑆖	𑆗	𑆘	𑆙	𑆚	𑆛	𑆜	𑆝	𑆞	𑆟	𑆠	𑆡	𑆢	𑆣	𑆤	𑆤𑇊	𑆥	𑆦	𑆧	𑆨	𑆩	𑆪	𑆪𑇊	𑆫	𑆫𑇊	𑆬	𑆭	𑆭𑇊	𑆮	𑆯	𑆰	𑆱	𑆲	𑆑𑇀𑆰	
Gurmukhi	ਕ	ਖ	ਗ	ਘ	ਙ	ਚ	ਛ	ਜ	ਝ	ਞ	ਟ	ਠ	ਡ	ਢ	ਣ	ਤ	ਥ	ਦ	ਧ	ਨ		ਪ	ਫ	ਬ	ਭ	ਮ	ਯ		ਰ		ਲ	ਲ਼		ਵ	ਸ਼		ਸ	ਹ		
Gujarati	ક	ખ	ગ	ઘ	ઙ	ચ	છ	જ	ઝ	ઞ	ટ	ઠ	ડ	ઢ	ણ	ત	થ	દ	ધ	ન		પ	ફ	બ	ભ	મ	ય		ર		લ	ળ		વ	શ	ષ	સ	હ	ક્ષ	
Odia	କ	ଖ	ଗ	ଘ	ଙ	ଚ	ଛ	ଜ	ଝ	ଞ	ଟ	ଠ	ଡ	ଢ	ଣ	ତ	ଥ	ଦ	ଧ	ନ		ପ	ଫ	ବ	ଭ	ମ	ଯ	ୟ	ର		ଲ	ଳ		ୱ	ଶ	ଷ	ସ	ହ	କ୍ଷ	
Grantha	𑌕	𑌖	𑌗	𑌘	𑌙	𑌚	𑌛	𑌜	𑌝	𑌞	𑌟	𑌠	𑌡	𑌢	𑌣	𑌤	𑌥	𑌦	𑌧	𑌨		𑌪	𑌫	𑌬	𑌭	𑌮	𑌯		𑌰		𑌲	𑌳		𑌵	𑌶	𑌷	𑌸	𑌹	𑌕𑍍𑌷	
Tamil	க				ங	ச		ஜ		ஞ	ட				ண	த				ந	ன	ப				ம	ய		ர	ற	ல	ள	ழ	வ	ஶ	ஷ	ஸ	ஹ	க்ஷ	
Telugu	క	ఖ	గ	ఘ	ఙ	చ	ఛ	జ	ఝ	ఞ	ట	ఠ	డ	ఢ	ణ	త	థ	ద	ధ	న	న఼	ప	ఫ	బ	భ	మ	య	య఼	ర	ఱ	ల	ళ	ఴ	వ	శ	ష	స	హ	క్ష	
Kannada	ಕ	ಖ	ಗ	ಘ	ಙ	ಚ	ಛ	ಜ	ಝ	ಞ	ಟ	ಠ	ಡ	ಢ	ಣ	ತ	ಥ	ದ	ಧ	ನ	ನ಼	ಪ	ಫ	ಬ	ಭ	ಮ	ಯ	ಯ಼	ರ	ಱ	ಲ	ಳ	ೞ	ವ	ಶ	ಷ	ಸ	ಹ	ಕ್ಷ	
Malayalam	ക	ഖ	ഗ	ഘ	ങ	ച	ഛ	ജ	ഝ	ഞ	ട	ഠ	ഡ	ഢ	ണ	ത	ഥ	ദ	ധ	ന	ഩ	പ	ഫ	ബ	ഭ	മ	യ		ര	റ	ല	ള	ഴ	വ	ശ	ഷ	സ	ഹ	ക്ഷ	ഺ
Tigalari	𑎒	𑎓	𑎔	𑎕	𑎖	𑎗	𑎘	𑎙	𑎚	𑎛	𑎜	𑎝	𑎞	𑎟	𑎠	𑎡	𑎢	𑎣	𑎤	𑎥		𑎦	𑎧	𑎨	𑎩	𑎪	𑎫		𑎬	𑎴	𑎭	𑎳	𑎵	𑎮	𑎯	𑎰	𑎱	𑎲	𑎒𑏊𑎰	
Sinhala	ක	ඛ	ග	ඝ	ඞ	ච	ඡ	ජ	ඣ	ඤ	ට	ඨ	ඩ	ඪ	ණ	ත	ථ	ද	ධ	න		ප	ඵ	බ	භ	ම	ය		ර		ල	ළ		ව	ශ	ෂ	ස	හ	ක්‍ෂ	
Tibetan	ཀ	ཁ	ག	གྷ	ང	ཅ	ཆ	ཇ	ཛྷ	ཉ	ཊ	ཋ	ཌ	ཌྷ	ཎ	ཏ	ཐ	ད	དྷ	ན		པ	ཕ	བ	བྷ	མ	ཡ		ར	ཬ (Note: Letter used in Balti.)	ལ			ཝ	ཤ	ཥ	ས	ཧ	ཀྵ	
ʼPhags-pa	ꡀ	ꡁ	ꡂ	ꡂꡜ	ꡃ	ꡄ	ꡅ	ꡆ	ꡆꡜ	ꡇ	ꡩ	ꡪ	ꡫ	ꡫꡜ	ꡬ	ꡈ	ꡉ	ꡊ	ꡊꡜ	ꡋ		ꡌ	ꡍ	ꡎ	ꡎꡜ	ꡏ	ꡗ		ꡘ		ꡙ			ꡓ	ꡚ		ꡛ	ꡜ		
Meitei Mayek (Note: includes supplementary consonants not in contemporary use)	ꯀ	ꯈ	ꯒ	ꯘ	ꯉ	ꯆ	ꫢ	ꯖ	ꯓ	ꫣ	ꫤ	ꫥ	ꫦ	ꫧ	ꫨ	ꯇ	ꯊ	ꯗ	ꯙ	ꯅ		ꯄ	ꯐ	ꯕ	ꯚ	ꯃ	ꯌ		ꯔ		ꯂ			ꯋ	ꫩ	ꫪ	ꯁ	ꯍ		
Lepcha	ᰀ	ᰂ	ᰃ		ᰅ	ᰆ	ᰇ	ᰈ		ᰉ	ᱍ	ᱎ	ᱏ			ᰊ	ᰋ	ᰌ		ᰍ		ᰎ	ᰐ	ᰓ		ᰕ	ᰚ		ᰛ		ᰜ			ᰟ	ᰡ	ᰡ᰷	ᰠ	ᰝ		
Limbu	ᤁ	ᤂ	ᤃ	ᤄ	ᤅ	ᤆ	ᤇ	ᤈ	ᤉ	ᤊ						ᤋ	ᤌ	ᤍ	ᤎ	ᤏ		ᤐ	ᤑ	ᤒ	ᤓ	ᤔ	ᤕ		ᤖ		ᤗ			ᤘ	ᤙ	ᤚ	ᤛ	ᤜ		
Tirhuta	𑒏	𑒐	𑒑	𑒒	𑒓	𑒔	𑒕	𑒖	𑒗	𑒘	𑒙	𑒚	𑒛	𑒜	𑒝	𑒞	𑒟	𑒠	𑒡	𑒢		𑒣	𑒤	𑒥	𑒦	𑒧	𑒨		𑒩		𑒪				𑒬	𑒭	𑒮	𑒯		
Kaithi	𑂍	𑂎	𑂏	𑂐	𑂑	𑂒	𑂓	𑂔	𑂕	𑂖	𑂗	𑂘	𑂙	𑂛	𑂝	𑂞	𑂟	𑂠	𑂡	𑂢		𑂣	𑂤	𑂥	𑂦	𑂧	𑂨		𑂩		𑂪			𑂫	𑂬	𑂭	𑂮	𑂯		
Newar	𑐎	𑐏	𑐐	𑐑	𑐒	𑐔	𑐕	𑐖	𑐗	𑐘	𑐚	𑐛	𑐜	𑐝	𑐞	𑐟	𑐠	𑐡	𑐢	𑐣	𑐣𑑆	𑐥	𑐦	𑐧	𑐨	𑐩	𑐫	𑐫𑑆	𑐬	𑐬𑑆	𑐮	𑐮𑑆	𑐲𑑆	𑐰	𑐱	𑐲	𑐳	𑐴	𑐎𑑂𑐲	
Sylheti Nagari	ꠇ	ꠈ	ꠉ	ꠊ		ꠌ	ꠍ	ꠎ	ꠏ		ꠐ	ꠑ	ꠒ	ꠓ		ꠔ	ꠕ	ꠖ	ꠗ	ꠘ		ꠙ	ꠚ	ꠛ	ꠜ	ꠝ			ꠞ		ꠟ						ꠡ	ꠢ		
Chakma (Note: inherent vowel is ā)	𑄇	𑄈	𑄉	𑄊	𑄋	𑄌	𑄍	𑄎	𑄏	𑄐	𑄑	𑄒	𑄓	𑄔	𑄕	𑄖	𑄗	𑄘	𑄙	𑄚		𑄛	𑄜	𑄝	𑄞	𑄟	𑄠	𑄡	𑄢		𑄣	𑅄		𑄤			𑄥	𑄦		
Burmese	က	ခ	ဂ	ဃ	င	စ	ဆ	ဇ	ဈ	ဉ / ည	ဋ	ဌ	ဍ	ဎ	ဏ	တ	ထ	ဒ	ဓ	န		ပ	ဖ	ဗ	ဘ	မ	ယ		ရ		လ	ဠ		ဝ	ၐ	ၑ	သ	ဟ		
Tai Tham	ᨠ	ᨡ,ᨢ (Note: Modified forms of these letters are or were used for distinctions made in local language; these distinctions are not made for Sanskrit and Pali.)	ᨣ,ᨤ	ᨥ	ᨦ	ᨧ	ᨨ	ᨩ,ᨪ	ᨫ	ᨬ	ᨭ	ᨮ	ᨯ	ᨰ	ᨱ	ᨲ	ᨳ	ᨴ	ᨵ	ᨶ		ᨷ,ᨸ	ᨹ,ᨺ	ᨻ,ᨼ	ᨽ	ᨾ	ᨿ,ᩀ		ᩁ		ᩃ	ᩊ		ᩅ	ᩆ	ᩇ	ᩈ	ᩉ,ᩌ		
New Tai Lue	ᦂ	ᦃ	ᦅ,ᦆ		ᦇ	ᦈ		ᦋ,ᦌ					ᦡ,ᦤ			ᦎ	ᦏ	ᦑ	ᦒ	ᦓ		ᦢ,ᦥ,ᦔ	ᦕ,ᦚ	ᦗ,ᦝ	ᦘ	ᦙ	ᦍ,ᦊ		ᦣ		ᦟ			ᦞ			ᦉ	ᦠ		
Khmer	ក	ខ	គ	ឃ	ង	ច	ឆ	ជ	ឈ	ញ	ដ	ឋ	ឌ	ឍ	ណ	ត	ថ	ទ	ធ	ន		ប	ផ	ព	ភ	ម	យ		រ		ល	ឡ		វ	ឝ	ឞ	ស	ហ		
Thai	ก	ข,(ฃ) (Note: Modified forms of these letters are or were used for distinctions made in Thai; these distinctions are not made for Sanskrit and Pali in the Thai script.)	ค,(ฅ)	ฆ	ง	จ	ฉ	ช,(ซ)	ฌ	ญ	ฎ,(ฏ)	ฐ	ฑ	ฒ	ณ	ด,(ต)	ถ	ท	ธ	น		ป,(บ)	ผ,(ฝ)	พ,(ฟ)	ภ	ม	ย		ร		ล	ฬ		ว	ศ	ษ	ส	ห,ฮ		
Lao	ກ	ຂ	ຄ	ຆ (Note: These letters are obsolete, but were used mainly for Sanskrit and Pali in the Lao script.)	ງ	ຈ	ຉ	ຊ	ຌ	ຎ	ຏ	ຐ	ຑ	ຒ	ຓ	ດ,ຕ	ຖ	ທ	ຘ	ນ		ບ,ປ	ຜ,ຝ	ພ,ຟ	ຠ	ມ	ຍ		ຣ		ລ	ຬ		ວ	ຨ	ຩ	ສ	ຫ		
Cham	ꨆ	ꨇ	ꨈ	ꨉ	ꨋ	ꨌ	ꨍ	ꨎ	ꨏ	ꨑ						ꨓ	ꨔ	ꨕ	ꨖ	ꨘ		ꨚ	ꨜ	ꨝ	ꨞ	ꨠ	ꨢ		ꨣ		ꨤ			ꨥ		ꨦ	ꨧ	ꨨ		
Kawi	𑼒	𑼓	𑼔	𑼕	𑼖	𑼗	𑼘	𑼙	𑼚	𑼛	𑼜	𑼝	𑼞	𑼟	𑼠	𑼡	𑼢	𑼣	𑼤	𑼥	𑼳	𑼦	𑼧	𑼨	𑼩	𑼪	𑼫		𑼬		𑼭			𑼮	𑼯	𑼰	𑼱	𑼲		
Balinese	ᬓ	ᬔ	ᬕ	ᬖ	ᬗ	ᬘ	ᬙ	ᬚ	ᬛ	ᬜ	ᬝ	ᬞ	ᬟ	ᬠ	ᬡ	ᬢ	ᬣ	ᬤ	ᬥ	ᬦ	ᭌ	ᬧ	ᬨ	ᬩ	ᬪ	ᬫ	ᬬ		ᬭ		ᬮ			ᬯ	ᬰ	ᬱ	ᬲ	ᬳ		
Javanese (Note: Letters used in Old Javanese. They are now obsolete, but are used for honorifics in contemporary Javanese.)	ꦏ	ꦑ	ꦒ	ꦓ	ꦔ	ꦕ	ꦖ	ꦗ	ꦙ	ꦚ	ꦛ	ꦜ	ꦝ	ꦞ	ꦟ	ꦠ	ꦡ	ꦢ	ꦣ	ꦤ	ꦘ	ꦥ	ꦦ	ꦧ	ꦨ	ꦩ	ꦪ		ꦫ		ꦭ			ꦮ	ꦯ	ꦰ	ꦱ	ꦲ		
Sundanese	ᮊ	ᮮ (Note: Invented new character to represent the Arabic letter خ.)	ᮌ		ᮍ	ᮎ		ᮏ		ᮑ						ᮒ		ᮓ		ᮔ		ᮕ		ᮘ		ᮙ	ᮚ		ᮛ		ᮜ			ᮝ	ᮯ (Note: Invented new character. Actually to represent the Arabic letter ش, which has similar pronunciation with śa.)		ᮞ	ᮠ		
Lontara	ᨀ		ᨁ		ᨂ	ᨌ		ᨍ		ᨎ						ᨈ		ᨉ		ᨊ		ᨄ		ᨅ		ᨆ	ᨐ		ᨑ		ᨒ			ᨓ			ᨔ	ᨕ		
Makasar	𑻠		𑻡		𑻢	𑻩		𑻪		𑻫						𑻦		𑻧		𑻨		𑻣		𑻤		𑻥	𑻬		𑻭		𑻮			𑻯			𑻰	𑻱		
Rejang	ꤰ		ꤱ		ꤲ	ꤹ		ꤺ		ꤻ						ꤳ		ꤴ		ꤵ		ꤶ		ꤷ		ꤸ	ꤿ		ꤽ		ꤾ			ꥀ			ꤼ	ꥁ		
Batak (Toba)	ᯂ		ᯎ		ᯝ			ᯐ		ᯠ/ᯛ						ᯖ		ᯑ		ᯉ		ᯇ		ᯅ		ᯔ			ᯒ		ᯞ			ᯞ			ᯘ	ᯂ		
Baybayin	ᜃ		ᜄ		ᜅ											ᜆ		ᜇ		ᜈ		ᜉ		ᜊ		ᜋ	ᜌ		ᜇ / ᜍ		ᜎ			ᜏ			ᜐ	ᜑ		
Buhid	ᝃ		ᝄ		ᝅ											ᝆ		ᝇ		ᝈ		ᝉ		ᝊ		ᝋ	ᝌ		ᝍ		ᝎ			ᝏ			ᝐ	ᝑ		
Hanunuo	ᜣ		ᜤ		ᜥ											ᜦ		ᜧ		ᜨ		ᜩ		ᜪ		ᜫ	ᜬ		ᜭ		ᜮ			ᜯ			ᜰ	ᜱ		
Tagbanwa	ᝣ		ᝤ		ᝥ											ᝦ		ᝧ		ᝨ		ᝩ		ᝪ		ᝫ	ᝬ				ᝮ			ᝯ			ᝰ			
ISO	ka	kha	ga	gha	ṅa	ca	cha	ja	jha	ña	ṭa	ṭha	ḍa	ḍha	ṇa	ta	tha	da	dha	na	ṉa	pa	pha	ba	bha	ma	ya	ẏa	ra	ṟa	la	ḷa	ḻa	va	śa	ṣa	sa	ha	kṣa	ṯa

=== Vowels ===
Vowels are presented in their independent form on the left of each column, and in their corresponding dependent form (vowel sign) combined with the consonant k on the right. A glyph for ka is an independent consonant letter itself without any vowel sign, where the vowel a is inherent.

ISO	a		ā		ê		ô		i		ī		u		ū		e		ē		ai		o		ō		au		ə		r̥		r̥̄		l̥		l̥̄ (Note: Only used by Sanskrit grammarians, and does not actually occur outside of a small handful of self-referential terms (e.g. its Sanskrit name, ॡकार l̥̄kāra).)		ṁ		ḥ		k	kŭ
ISO	a	ka	ā	kā	ê	kê	ô	kô	i	ki	ī	kī	u	ku	ū	kū	e	ke	ē	kē	ai	kai	o	ko	ō	kō	au	kau	ə	kə	r̥	kr̥	r̥̄	kr̥̄	l̥	kl̥	l̥̄	kl̥̄	aṁ	kaṁ	aḥ	kaḥ	k	kŭ
Ashoka Brahmi	𑀅	𑀓	𑀆	𑀓𑀸					𑀇	𑀓𑀺	𑀈	𑀓𑀻	𑀉	𑀓𑀼	𑀊	𑀓𑀽	𑁱	𑀓𑁳	𑀏	𑀓𑁂	𑀐	𑀓𑁃	𑁲	𑀓𑁴	𑀑	𑀓𑁄	𑀒	𑀓𑁅			𑀋	𑀓𑀾	𑀌	𑀓𑀿	𑀍	𑀓𑁀	𑀎	𑀓𑁁	𑀅𑀁	𑀓𑀁	𑀅𑀂	𑀓𑀂	𑀓𑁆	
Devanagari	अ	क	आ	का	ऍ	कॅ	ऑ	कॉ	इ	कि	ई	की	उ	कु	ऊ	कू	ऎ	कॆ	ए	के	ऐ	कै	ऒ	कॊ	ओ	को	औ	कौ			ऋ	कृ	ॠ	कॄ	ऌ	कॢ	ॡ	कॣ	अं	कं	अः	कः	क्	
Bengali–Assamese	অ	ক	আ	কা	অ্যা	ক্যা			ই	কি	ঈ	কী	উ	কু	ঊ	কূ			এ	কে	ঐ	কৈ			ও	কো	ঔ	কৌ			ঋ	কৃ	ৠ	কৄ	ঌ	কৢ	ৡ	কৣ	অং	কং	অঃ	কঃ	ক্	
Gujarati	અ	ક	આ	કા	ઍ	કૅ	ઑ	કૉ	ઇ	કિ	ઈ	કી	ઉ	કુ	ઊ	કૂ			એ	કે	ઐ	કૈ			ઓ	કો	ઔ	કૌ			ઋ	કૃ	ૠ	કૄ	ઌ	કૢ	ૡ	કૣ	અં	કં	અઃ	કઃ	ક્ ક્‍	
Odia	ଅ	କ	ଆ	କା					ଇ	କି	ଈ	କୀ	ଉ	କୁ	ଊ	କୂ			ଏ	କେ	ଐ	କୈ			ଓ	କୋ	ଔ	କୌ			ଋ	କୃ	ୠ	କୄ	ଌ	କୢ	ୡ	କୣ	ଅଂ	କଂ	ଅଃ	କଃ	କ୍	
Gurmukhi	ਅ	ਕ	ਆ	ਕਾ					ਇ	ਕਿ	ਈ	ਕੀ	ਉ	ਕੁ	ਊ	ਕੂ			ਏ	ਕੇ	ਐ	ਕੈ			ਓ	ਕੋ	ਔ	ਕੌ											ਅਂ	ਕਂ	ਅਃ	ਕਃ	ਕ੍	
Meitei Mayek (Note: includes supplementary vowels not in contemporary use)	ꯑ	ꯀ	ꯑꯥ	ꯀꯥ					ꯏ	ꯀꯤ	ꯑꫫ	ꯀꫫ	ꯎ	ꯀꯨ	ꯑꫬ	ꯀꫬ			ꯑꯦ	ꯀꯦ	ꯑꯩ	ꯀꯩ			ꯑꯣ	ꯀꯣ	ꯑꯧ	ꯀꯧ											ꯑꯪ	ꯀꯪ	ꯑꫵ	ꯀꫵ	ꯛ	
Tibetan (Note: Tibetan, Lepcha, Limbu, New Tai Lue, Thai and Lao scripts do not have independent vowel forms. For syllables starting with a vowel sound, a "zero" consonant is used.)	ཨ	ཀ	ཨཱ	ཀཱ					ཨི	ཀི	ཨཱི	ཀཱི	ཨུ	ཀུ	ཨཱུ	ཀཱུ			ཨེ	ཀེ	ཨཻ	ཀཻ			ཨོ	ཀོ	ཨཽ	ཀཽ			རྀ	ཀྲྀ	རཱྀ	ཀྲཱྀ	ལྀ	ཀླྀ	ལཱྀ	ཀླཱྀ	ཨཾ	ཀཾ	ཨཿ	ཀཿ	ཀ྄	
Lepcha	ᰣ	ᰀ	ᰣᰦ	ᰀᰦ					ᰣᰧ	ᰀᰧ	ᰣᰧᰶ	ᰀᰧᰶ	ᰣᰪ	ᰀᰪ	ᰣᰫ	ᰀᰫ			ᰣᰬ	ᰀᰬ					ᰣᰨ	ᰀᰨ	ᰣᰩ	ᰀᰩ											ᰣᰴ	ᰀᰴ				
Limbu	ᤀ	ᤁ	ᤀᤠ	ᤁᤠ					ᤀᤡ	ᤁᤡ	ᤀᤡ᤺	ᤁᤡ᤺	ᤀᤢ	ᤁᤢ	ᤀᤢ᤺	ᤁᤢ᤺	ᤀᤧ	ᤁᤧ	ᤀᤣ	ᤁᤣ	ᤀᤤ	ᤁᤤ	ᤀᤨ	ᤁᤨ	ᤀᤥ	ᤁᤥ	ᤀᤦ	ᤁᤦ											ᤀᤲ	ᤁᤲ			ᤁ᤻	
Tirhuta	𑒁	𑒏	𑒂	𑒏𑒰					𑒃	𑒏𑒱	𑒄	𑒏𑒲	𑒅	𑒏𑒳	𑒆	𑒏𑒴		𑒏𑒺	𑒋	𑒏𑒹	𑒌	𑒏𑒻		𑒏𑒽	𑒍	𑒏𑒼	𑒎	𑒏𑒾			𑒇	𑒏𑒵	𑒈	𑒏𑒶	𑒉	𑒏𑒷	𑒊	𑒏𑒸	𑒁𑓀	𑒏𑓀	𑒁𑓁	𑒏𑓁	𑒏𑓂	
Kaithi	𑂃	𑂍	𑂄	𑂍𑂰					𑂅	𑂍𑂱	𑂆	𑂍𑂲	𑂇	𑂍𑂳	𑂈	𑂍𑂴			𑂉	𑂍𑂵	𑂊	𑂍𑂶			𑂋	𑂍𑂷	𑂌	𑂍𑂸											𑂃𑂁	𑂍𑂁	𑂃𑂂	𑂍𑂂	𑂍𑂹	
Newar	𑐀	𑐎	𑐁	𑐎𑐵					𑐂	𑐎𑐶	𑐃	𑐎𑐷	𑐄	𑐎𑐸	𑐅	𑐎𑐹			𑐊	𑐎𑐾	𑐋	𑐎𑐿			𑐌	𑐎𑑀	𑐍	𑐎𑑁			𑐆	𑐎𑐺	𑐇	𑐎𑐻	𑐈	𑐎𑐼	𑐉	𑐎𑐽	𑐀𑑄	𑐎𑑄	𑐀𑑅	𑐎𑑅	𑐎𑑂	
Sylheti Nagari		ꠇ	ꠀ	ꠇꠣ					ꠁ	ꠇꠤ			ꠃ	ꠇꠥ					ꠄ	ꠇꠦ	ꠅꠂ	ꠇꠂ			ꠅ	ꠇꠧ													ꠀꠋ	ꠇꠋ			ꠇ꠆	
Tamil	அ	க	ஆ	கா					இ	கி	ஈ	கீ	உ	கு	ஊ	கூ	எ	கெ	ஏ	கே	ஐ	கை	ஒ	கொ	ஓ	கோ	ஔ	கௌ											அஂ	கஂ	அஃ	கஃ	க்	
Kannada	ಅ	ಕ	ಆ	ಕಾ					ಇ	ಕಿ	ಈ	ಕೀ	ಉ	ಕು	ಊ	ಕೂ	ಎ	ಕೆ	ಏ	ಕೇ	ಐ	ಕೈ	ಒ	ಕೊ	ಓ	ಕೋ	ಔ	ಕೌ			ಋ	ಕೃ	ೠ	ಕೄ	ಌ	ಕೢ	ೡ	ಕೣ	అం	ಕಂ	అః	ಕಃ	ಕ್	
Telugu	అ	క	ఆ	కా					ఇ	కి	ఈ	కీ	ఉ	కు	ఊ	కూ	ఎ	కె	ఏ	కే	ఐ	కై	ఒ	కొ	ఓ	కో	ఔ	కౌ			ఋ	కృ	ౠ	కౄ	ఌ	కౢ	ౡ	కౣ	అం	కం	అః	కః	క్	
Sinhala	අ	ක	ආ	කා	ඇ	කැ	ඈ	කෑ	ඉ	කි	ඊ	කී	උ	කු	ඌ	කූ	එ	කෙ	ඒ	කේ	ඓ	කෛ	ඔ	කො	ඕ	කෝ	ඖ	කෞ			ඍ	කෘ	ඎ	කෲ	ඏ	කෟ	ඐ	කෳ	අං	කං	අඃ	කඃ	ක්	
Malayalam	അ	ക	ആ	കാ					ഇ	കി	ഈ	കീ	ഉ	കു	ഊ	കൂ	എ	കെ	ഏ	കേ	ഐ	കൈ	ഒ	കൊ	ഓ	കോ	ഔ	കൗ			ഋ	കൃ	ൠ	കൄ	ഌ	കൢ	ൡ	കൣ	അം	കം	അഃ	കഃ	ക് ക്‍	കു് ക്
Chakma	𑄃𑄧	𑄇𑄧	𑄃	𑄇	𑄃𑄬𑄬	𑄇𑄬𑄬	𑄃𑅅	𑄇𑅅	𑄄 𑄃𑄨	𑄇𑄨	𑄃𑄩	𑄇𑄩	𑄅 𑄃𑄪	𑄇𑄪	𑄃𑄫	𑄇𑄫			𑄆 𑄃𑄬	𑄇𑄬	𑄃𑄰	𑄇𑄰			𑄃𑄮	𑄇𑄮	𑄃𑄯	𑄇𑄯											𑄃𑄧𑄁	𑄇𑄧𑄁	𑄃𑄧𑄂	𑄇𑄧𑄂	𑄇𑄴	
Burmese	အ	က	အာ	ကာ					ဣ	ကိ	ဤ	ကီ	ဥ	ကု	ဦ	ကူ			ဧ	ကေ	အဲ	ကဲ	ဩ	ကော			အောင်	ကောင်			ၒ	ကၖ	ၓ	ကၗ	ၔ	ကၘ	ၕ	ကၙ	အံ	ကံ	အး	ကး	က်	
Tai Tham	ᩋ	ᨠ	ᩋᩣ	ᨠᩣ ᨠᩤ	ᩋᩯ	ᨠᩯ	(ᩋᩬᩴ) (ᩋᩳ)	(ᨠᩬᩴ) (ᨠᩳ)	ᩍ	ᨠᩥ	ᩎ	ᨠᩦ	ᩏ	ᨠᩩ	ᩐ	ᨠᩪ	(ᩋᩮᩡ)	(ᨠᩮᩡ)	ᩑ	ᨠᩮ	ᩋᩱ	ᨠᩱ	(ᩋᩰᩡ)	(ᨠᩰᩡ)	ᩒ ᩋᩰ	ᨠᩰ ᨠᩮᩣ	ᩋᩮᩢᩣ ᩋᩯᩣ ᩐᩣ	ᨠᩮᩢᩣ ᨠᩮᩫᩣ ᨠᩯᩣ			ᩁᩂ	ᨠᩂ							ᩋᩴ	ᨠᩴ	ᩋᩡ	ᨠᩡ	ᨠ᩺ ᨠ᩼	
New Tai Lue	ᦀ	ᦂ	ᦀᦱ	ᦂᦱ	ᦶᦀ	ᦶᦂ	(ᦀᦸ)	(ᦂᦸ)	ᦀᦲᦰ	ᦂᦲᦰ	ᦀᦲ	ᦂᦲ	ᦀᦳ	ᦂᦳ	ᦀᦴ	ᦂᦴ	(ᦵᦀᦰ)	(ᦵᦂᦰ)	ᦵᦀ	ᦵᦂ	ᦺᦀ	ᦺᦂ	(ᦷᦀᦰ)	(ᦷᦂᦰ)	ᦷᦀ	ᦷᦂ	ᦀᧁ	ᦂᧁ													ᦀᦰ	ᦂᦰ	ᧅ	
Khmer (Note: When used to write their own languages, Khmer can have either an a or an o as the inherent vowel, following the rules of its orthography.)	អ	ក	អា	កា					ឥ	កិ	ឦ	កី	ឧ	កុ	ឩ	កូ			ឯ	កេ	ឰ	កៃ			ឱ	កោ	ឳ	កៅ			ឫ	ក្ឫ	ឬ	ក្ឬ	ឭ	ក្ឭ	ឮ	ក្ឮ	អំ	កំ	អះ	កះ	ក៑	
Thai	อ (อะ)	ก (กะ)	อา	กา	แอ	แก	ออ	กอ	อิ	กิ	อี	กี	อุ	กุ	อู	กู	เอะ	เกะ	เอ	เก	ไอ	ไก	โอะ	โกะ	โอ	โก	เอา	เกา	เออ	เกอ	ฤ	กฺฤ	ฤๅ	กฺฤๅ	ฦ	กฺฦ	ฦๅ	กฺฦๅ	อํ	กํ	อะ (อะฮฺ)	กะ (กะฮฺ)	กฺ (ก์)	กึ
Lao	ອະ	ກະ	ອາ	ກາ	ແອ	ແກ	(ອອ)	(ກອ)	ອິ	ກິ	ອີ	ກີ	ອຸ	ກຸ	ອູ	ກູ	(ແອະ)	(ແກະ)	ເອ	ເກ	ໄອ ໃອ	ໄກ ໃກ	(ໂອະ)	(ໂກະ)	ໂອ	ໂກ	ເອົາ ອາວ	ເກົາ ກາວ											ອํ	ກํ	ອະ	ກະ	ກ	
Cham	ꨀ	ꨆ	ꨀꨩ	ꨆꨩ					ꨁ	ꨆꨪ	ꨁꨩ	ꨆꨫ	ꨂ	ꨆꨭ	ꨂꨩ	ꨆꨭꨩ			ꨃ	ꨆꨯꨮ	ꨄ	ꨆꨰ			ꨅ	ꨆꨯ	ꨀꨯꨱ	ꨆꨯꨱ			ꨣꨮ	ꨆꨴꨮ	ꨣꨮꨩ	ꨆꨴꨮꨩ	ꨤꨮ	ꨆꨵꨮ	ꨤꨮꨩ	ꨆꨵꨮꨩ	ꨀꩌ	ꨆꩌ	ꨀꩍ	ꨆꩍ	ꩀ	
Kawi	𑼄	𑼒	𑼅	𑼒𑼴					𑼆	𑼒𑼶	𑼇	𑼒𑼷	𑼈	𑼒𑼸	𑼉	𑼒𑼹	𑼎	𑼒𑼾			𑼏	𑼒𑼿	𑼐	𑼒𑼾𑼴			𑼐𑼴	𑼒𑼿𑼴	𑼄𑽀	𑼒𑽀	𑼊	𑼒𑼺	𑼊𑼴	𑼒𑼺𑼴	𑼌	𑼒𑽂𑼌	𑼍	𑼒𑽂𑼭𑽀𑼴	𑼄𑼁	𑼒𑼁	𑼄𑼃	𑼒𑼃	𑼒𑽁	
Balinese	ᬅ	ᬓ	ᬆ	ᬓᬵ					ᬇ	ᬓᬶ	ᬈ	ᬓᬷ	ᬉ	ᬓᬸ	ᬊ	ᬓᬹ	ᬏ	ᬓᬾ			ᬐ	ᬓᬿ	ᬑ	ᬓᭀ			ᬒ	ᬓᭁ	ᬅᭂ	ᬓᭂ	ᬋ	ᬓᬺ	ᬌ	ᬓᬻ	ᬍ	ᬓᬼ	ᬎ	ᬓᬽ	ᬅᬂ	ᬓᬂ	ᬅᬄ	ᬓᬄ	ᬓ᭄	
Javanese	ꦄ	ꦏ	ꦄꦴ	ꦏꦴ					ꦆ	ꦏꦶ	ꦇ	ꦏꦷ	ꦈ	ꦏꦸ	ꦈꦴ	ꦏꦹ	ꦌ	ꦏꦺ			ꦍ	ꦏꦻ	ꦎ	ꦏꦺꦴ			ꦎꦴ	ꦏꦻꦴ	ꦄꦼ	ꦏꦼ	ꦉ	ꦏꦽ	ꦉꦴ	ꦏꦽꦴ	ꦊ	ꦏ꧀ꦊ	ꦋ	ꦏ꧀ꦋ	ꦄꦁ	ꦏꦁ	ꦄꦃ	ꦏꦃ	ꦏ꧀	
Sundanese	ᮃ	ᮊ							ᮄ	ᮊᮤ			ᮅ	ᮊᮥ			ᮆ	ᮊᮦ					ᮇ	ᮊᮧ					ᮈ	ᮊᮨ	ᮻ (Note: Letters used in Old Sundanese.)	ᮊ᮪ᮻ			ᮼ	ᮊ᮪ᮼ			ᮃᮀ	ᮊᮀ	ᮃᮂ	ᮊᮂ	ᮊ᮪	
Lontara	ᨕ	ᨀ							ᨕᨗ	ᨀᨗ			ᨕᨘ	ᨀᨘ			ᨕᨙ	ᨀᨙ					ᨕᨚ	ᨀᨚ					ᨕᨛ	ᨀᨛ														
Makasar	𑻱	𑻠							𑻱𑻳	𑻠𑻳			𑻱𑻴	𑻠𑻴			𑻱𑻵	𑻠𑻵					𑻱𑻶	𑻠𑻶																				
Rejang	ꥆ	ꤰ			ꥆꥎ	ꤰꥎ	ꥆꥍ	ꤰꥍ	ꥆꥇ	ꤰꥇ			ꥆꥈ	ꤰꥈ			ꥆꥉ	ꤰꥉ			ꥆꥊ	ꤰꥊ	ꥆꥋ	ꤰꥋ			ꥆꥌ	ꤰꥌ											ꥆꥏ	ꤰꥏ	ꥆꥒ	ꤰꥒ	ꤰ꥓	
Batak (Toba)	ᯀ	ᯂ							ᯤ	ᯂᯪ			ᯥ	ᯂᯮ				ᯂᯩ						ᯂᯬ															ᯀᯰ	ᯂᯰ	ᯀᯱ	ᯂᯱ	ᯂ᯲	
Baybayin	ᜀ	ᜃ							ᜁ	ᜃᜒ			ᜂ	ᜃᜓ			ᜁ	ᜃᜒ					ᜂ	ᜃᜓ																			ᜃ᜔	
Buhid	ᝀ	ᝃ							ᝁ	ᝃᝒ			ᝂ	ᝃᝓ																														
Hanunuo	ᜠ	ᜣ							ᜡ	ᜣᜲ			ᜢ	ᜣᜳ																													ᜣ᜴	
Tagbanwa	ᝠ	ᝣ							ᝡ	ᝣᝲ			ᝢ	ᝣᝳ																														
ISO	a	ka	ā	kā	ê	kê	ô	kô	i	ki	ī	kī	u	ku	ū	kū	e	ke	ē	kē	ai	kai	o	ko	ō	kō	au	kau	ə	kə	r̥	kr̥	r̥̄	kr̥̄	l̥	kl̥	l̥̄	kl̥̄	aṁ	kaṁ	aḥ	kaḥ	k	kŭ
ISO	a		ā		ê		ô		i		ī		u		ū		e		ē		ai		o		ō		au		ə		r̥		r̥̄		l̥		l̥̄		ṁ		ḥ			

=== Numerals ===
Hindu-Arabic	0	1	2	3	4	5	6	7	8	9
Brahmi numbers		𑁒	𑁓	𑁔	𑁕	𑁖	𑁗	𑁘	𑁙	𑁚
Brahmi digits	𑁦	𑁧	𑁨	𑁩	𑁪	𑁫	𑁬	𑁭	𑁮	𑁯
Bengali–Assamese	০	১	২	৩	৪	৫	৬	৭	৮	৯
Tirhuta	𑓐	𑓑	𑓒	𑓓	𑓔	𑓕	𑓖	𑓗	𑓘	𑓙
Odia	୦	୧	୨	୩	୪	୫	୬	୭	୮	୯
Devanagari	०	१	२	३	४	५	६	७	८	९
Gujarati	૦	૧	૨	૩	૪	૫	૬	૭	૮	૯
Modi	𑙐	𑙑	𑙒	𑙓	𑙔	𑙕	𑙖	𑙗	𑙘	𑙙
Sharada	𑇐	𑇑	𑇒	𑇓	𑇔	𑇕	𑇖	𑇗	𑇘	𑇙
Takri	𑛀	𑛁	𑛂	𑛃	𑛄	𑛅	𑛆	𑛇	𑛈	𑛉
Gurmukhi	੦	੧	੨	੩	੪	੫	੬	੭	੮	੯
Khudabadi	𑋰	𑋱	𑋲	𑋳	𑋴	𑋵	𑋶	𑋷	𑋸	𑋹
Meitei (Manipuri)	꯰	꯱	꯲	꯳	꯴	꯵	꯶	꯷	꯸	꯹
Newar	𑑐	𑑑	𑑒	𑑓	𑑔	𑑕	𑑖	𑑗	𑑘	𑑙
Tibetan	༠	༡	༢	༣	༤	༥	༦	༧	༨	༩
Mongolian (Note: Mongolian numerals are derived from Tibetan numerals and used in conjunction with the Mongolian and Clear script)	᠐	᠑	᠒	᠓	᠔	᠕	᠖	᠗	᠘	᠙
Lepcha	᱀	᱁	᱂	᱃	᱄	᱅	᱆	᱇	᱈	᱉
Limbu	᥆	᥇	᥈	᥉	᥊	᥋	᥌	᥍	᥎	᥏
Sinhala astrological numbers	෦	෧	෨	෩	෪	෫	෬	෭	෮	෯
Sinhala archaic numbers		𑇡	𑇢	𑇣	𑇤	𑇥	𑇦	𑇧	𑇨	𑇩
Tamil	೦	௧	௨	௩	௪	௫	௬	௭	௮	௯
Telugu	౦	౧	౨	౩	౪	౫	౬	౭	౮	౯
Kannada	೦	೧	೨	೩	೪	೫	೬	೭	೮	೯
Malayalam	൦	൧	൨	൩	൪	൫	൬	൭	൮	൯
Saurashtra	꣐	꣑	꣒	꣓	꣔	꣕	꣖	꣗	꣘	꣙
Ahom	𑜰	𑜱	𑜲	𑜳	𑜴	𑜵	𑜶	𑜷	𑜸	𑜹
Chakma	𑄶	𑄷	𑄸	𑄹	𑄺	𑄻	𑄼	𑄽	𑄾	𑄿
Burmese	၀	၁	၂	၃	၄	၅	၆	၇	၈	၉
Tai Tham Astrological Numbers (Note: for everyday use)	᪀	᪁	᪂	᪃	᪄	᪅	᪆	᪇	᪈	᪉
New Tai Lue	᧐	᧑	᧒	᧓	᧔	᧕	᧖	᧗	᧘	᧙
Shan	႐	႑	႒	႓	႔	႕	႖	႗	႘	႙
Khmer	០	១	២	៣	៤	៥	៦	៧	៨	៩
Thai	๐	๑	๒	๓	๔	๕	๖	๗	๘	๙
Lao	໐	໑	໒	໓	໔	໕	໖	໗	໘	໙
Tai Tham (Note: for liturgical use)	᪐	᪑	᪒	᪓	᪔	᪕	᪖	᪗	᪘	᪙
Cham	꩐	꩑	꩒	꩓	꩔	꩕	꩖	꩗	꩘	꩙
Balinese	᭐	᭑	᭒	᭓	᭔	᭕	᭖	᭗	᭘	᭙
Javanese	꧐	꧑	꧒	꧓	꧔	꧕	꧖	꧗	꧘	꧙
Sundanese	᮰	᮱	᮲	᮳	᮴	᮵	᮶	᮷	᮸	᮹
Hindu-Arabic	0	1	2	3	4	5	6	7	8	9

== List of Brahmic scripts ==
=== Historical ===
The Brahmi script was already divided into regional variants at the time of the earliest surviving epigraphy around the 3rd century BC. Cursives of the Brahmi script began to diversify further from around the 5th century AD and continued to give rise to new scripts throughout the Middle Ages. The main division in antiquity was between northern and southern Brahmi. In the northern group, the Gupta script was very influential, and in the southern group the Vatteluttu and Kadamba/Pallava scripts with the spread of Buddhism sent Brahmic scripts throughout Southeast Asia.

Early Brahmic scripts
IAST	Ashoka	Girnar	Kushana	Gujarat	Gupta	Narbada	Kistna
a							
ā							
i							
ī							
u							
ū							
ṛ							
e							
ai							
o							
au							
k							
kh							
g							
gh							
ṅ							
c							
ch							
j							
jh							
ñ							
ṭ							
ṭh							
ḍ							
ḍh							
ṇ							
t							
th							
d							
dh							
n							
p							
ph							
b							
bh							
m							
y							
r							
l							
v							
ś							
ṣ							
s							
h							

=== Northern Brahmic ===
- Gupta, 4th century
  - Sharada
    - Landa
      - Gurmukhi
      - Khojki
      - Khudabadi
      - Mahajani
      - Multani
    - Takri
      - Chamba
      - Dogri
      - Sirmauri
  - Siddhaṃ
    - Nagari
      - Devanagari
      - Modi
      - Gujarati
      - Nandinagari
      - Kaithi
        - Sylheti Nagari
    - Ancient Kamarupi
      - Assamese (traditional)
    - Gaudi
      - Bengali–Assamese (Eastern Nagari)
        - Assamese (standard)
        - Bengali
      - Tirhuta (Mithilakshar)
      - Odia
      - Nepalese
        - Newar
        - Bhujimol
        - Ranjana
          - Soyombo
  - Tibetan
    - Meitei Mayek
    - Lepcha
      - Limbu
    - Khema
    - ʼPhags-pa
      - Zanabazar square
    - Marchen
      - Marchung
      - Pungs-chen
      - Pungs-chung
      - Drusha
  - Kalinga
  - Bhaiksuki
- Tocharian (Slanting Brahmi)

=== Southern Brahmic ===
- Tamil-Brahmi, 2nd century BC
  - Pallava
    - Tamil
    - Grantha
      - Malayalam
        - Malabar
      - Tigalari
      - Saurashtra
      - Dhives Akuru
      - Thirke
    - Khmer
      - Khom Thai
      - Proto-Tai script?
        - Sukhothai
          - Thai
          - Fakkham
            - Thai Noi
              - Lao
        - Tai Viet
        - Dai Don
        - Lai Tay
        - Lai Pao
    - Cham
    - Kawi
      - Balinese
      - Batak
      - Buda
      - Javanese
      - Old Sundanese
        - Sundanese
      - Lontara
      - Makasar
      - Ulu scripts
        - Incung
        - Lampung
        - Lembak
        - Ogan
        - Pasemah
        - Rejang
        - Serawai
      - Baybayin
        - Buhid
        - Hanunó'o
        - Tagbanwa
        - Kulitan
        - Basahan
    - Mon–Burmese
      - Modern Mon
      - Burmese
        - Chakma
        - S'gaw Karen
        - Shan
        - Tanchangya
        - Lik-Tai scripts
          - Ahom
          - Khamti
          - Tai Le
      - Tai Tham
        - New Tai Lue
    - Pyu
  - Vatteluttu
    - Kolezhuthu
    - Malayanma
  - Sinhala
- Bhattiprolu script
- Kadamba
  - Telugu-Kannada
    - Telugu
    - Kannada
      - Goykanadi

== Unicode of Brahmic scripts ==
As of Unicode version 18.0, the following Brahmic scripts have been encoded:

script	derivation	Period of derivation	usage notes	ISO 15924	Unicode range(s)	sample
Ahom	Burmese	13th century	Extinct Ahom language	Ahom	U+11700–U+1174F	𑜒𑜠𑜑𑜨𑜉
Balinese	Kawi	11th century	Balinese language	Bali	U+1B00–U+1B7F	ᬅᬓ᭄ᬲᬭᬩᬮᬶ
Batak	Pallava	14th century	Batak languages	Batk	U+1BC0–U+1BFF	ᯘᯮᯒᯖ᯲ ᯅᯖᯂ᯲
Baybayin	Kawi	14th century	Tagalog, other Philippine languages	Tglg	U+1700–U+171F	ᜊᜌ᜔ᜊᜌᜒᜈ᜔
Bengali–Assamese (Eastern Nagari)	Siddhaṃ	11th century	Assamese language (Assamese script variant), Bengali language (Bengali script variant), Bishnupriya, Maithili, Meitei language (constitutionally termed as "Manipuri")	Beng	U+0980–U+09FF, U+11DF0–U11DFF	অসমীয়া লিপি; বাংলা লিপি
Bhaiksuki	Gupta	11th century	Was used around the turn of the first millennium for writing Sanskrit	Bhks	U+11C00–U+11C6F	𑰥𑰹𑰎𑰿𑰬𑰲𑰎𑰱
Buhid	Kawi	14th century	Buhid language	Buhd	U+1740–U+175F	ᝊᝓᝑᝒᝇ
Mon-Burmese	Pallava	11th century	Burmese language, Mon language, numerous modifications for other languages including Chakma, Eastern and Western Pwo Karen, Geba Karen, Kayah, Rumai Palaung, S'gaw Karen, Shan	Mymr	U+1000–U+109F, U+A9E0–U+A9FF, U+AA60–U+AA7F, U+116D0–U116FF	မြန်မာအက္ခရာ
Chakma	Burmese	8th century	Chakma language	Cakm	U+11100–U+1114F	𑄌𑄋𑄴𑄟𑄳𑄦
Cham	Pallava	8th century	Cham language	Cham	U+AA00–U+AA5F	ꨌꩌ
Devanagari	Nagari	13th century	Several Indo-Aryan languages (Konkani, Marathi, Hindi, Sanskrit, Nepali, Bhili, Sindhi, Gujarati etc), Sino-Tibetan languages (Bodo, Nepal Bhasa, Sherpa etc.), Mundari (Austroasiatic language) and others.	Deva	U+0900–U+097F, U+A8E0–U+A8FF, U+11B00–U+11B5F	देवनागरी
Dhives Akuru	Gupta	Before 6th-8th century	Was used to write the Maldivian language up until the 20th century.	Diak	U+11900–U+1195F	𑤞𑥂𑤧𑤭𑥂
Dogra	Takri		Was used to write Dogri. Dogra script is closely related to Takri.	Dogr	U+11800–U+1184F	𑠖𑠵𑠌𑠤𑠬
Grantha	Pallava	6th century	Restricted use in traditional Vedic schools to write Sanskrit. Was widely used by Tamil speakers for Sanskrit and the classical language Manipravalam.	Gran	U+11300–U+1137F	𑌗𑍍𑌰𑌨𑍍𑌥
Gujarati	Nagari	17th century	Gujarati language, Kutchi language	Gujr	U+0A80–U+0AFF	ગુજરાતી લિપિ
Gunjala Gondi	uncertain	16th century	Used for writing the Adilabad dialect of the Gondi language.	Gong	U+11D60–U+11DAF	𑵶𑶍𑶕𑶀𑵵𑶊 𑵶𑶓𑶕𑶂𑶋
Gurmukhi	Sharada	16th century	Punjabi language	Guru	U+0A00–U+0A7F	ਗੁਰਮੁਖੀ
Hanunó'o	Kawi	14th century	Hanuno'o language	Hano	U+1720–U+173F	ᜱᜨᜳᜨᜳᜢ
Javanese	Kawi	16th century	Javanese language, Sundanese language, Madurese language	Java	U+A980–U+A9DF	ꦄꦏ꧀ꦱꦫꦗꦮ
Kaithi	Nagari	16th century	Historically used for writing legal, administrative, and private records.	Kthi	U+11080–U+110CF	𑂍𑂶𑂟𑂲
Kannada	Telugu-Kannada	Around 4th-6th century	Sanskrit, Kannada, Konkani, Tulu, Badaga, Kodava, Beary, others	Knda	U+0C80–U+0CFF	ಕನ್ನಡ ಅಕ್ಷರಮಾಲೆ
Kawi	Pallava	8th century	Kawi was found primarily in Java and used across much of Maritime Southeast Asia between the 8th century and the 16th century.	Kawi	U+11F00–U+11F5F	𑼒𑼮𑼶
Khmer	Pallava	11th century	Khmer language	Khmr	U+1780–U+17FF, U+19E0–U+19FF	អក្សរខ្មែរ
Khojki	Landa	16th century	Some use by Ismaili communities. Was used by the Khoja community for Muslim religious literature.	Khoj	U+11200–U+1124F	𑈉𑈲𑈐𑈈𑈮
Khudawadi	Landa	16th century	Was used by Sindhi communities for correspondence and business records.	Sind	U+112B0–U+112FF	𑊻𑋩𑋣𑋏𑋠𑋔𑋠𑋏𑋢
Lao	Tai Noi	14th century	Lao language, others	Laoo	U+0E80–U+0EFF	ອັກສອນລາວ
Lepcha	Tibetan	18th century	Lepcha language	Lepc	U+1C00–U+1C4F	ᰛᰩᰴ
Limbu	Lepcha	18th century	Limbu language	Limb	U+1900–U+194F	ᤛᤡᤖᤡᤈᤨᤅ
Lontara	Kawi	17th century	Buginese language, others	Bugi	U+1A00–U+1A1F	ᨒᨚᨈᨑ
Mahajani	Landa	16th century	Historically used in northern India for writing accounts and financial records.	Mahj	U+11150–U+1117F	𑅬𑅱𑅛𑅧𑅑
Makasar	Kawi	17th century	Was used in South Sulawesi, Indonesia for writing the Makassarese language. Makasar script is also known as "Old Makassarese" or "Makassarese bird script" in English-language scholarly works.	Maka	U+11EE0–U+11EFF	𑻪𑻢𑻪𑻢
Malayalam	Grantha	12th century	Malayalam	Mlym	U+0D00–U+0D7F	മലയാളലിപി
Marchen	Tibetan	7th century	Was used in the Tibetan Bön tradition to write the extinct Zhang-Zhung language	Marc	U+11C70–U+11CBF	𑱳𑲁𑱽𑱾𑲌𑱵𑲋𑲱𑱴𑱶𑲱𑲅𑲊𑱱
Meetei Mayek	Tibetan	6th century	officially used for Meitei language (constitutionally termed as "Manipuri") in accordance to "The Manipur Official Language (Amendment) Act, 2021"	Mtei	U+AAE0–U+AAFF, U+ABC0–U+ABFF	ꯃꯤꯇꯩ ꯃꯌꯦꯛ
Modi	Nāgarī	17th century	Was used to write the Marathi language	Modi	U+11600–U+1165F	𑘦𑘻𑘚𑘲
Multani	Landa		Was used to write the Multani language	Mult	U+11280–U+112AF	𑊠𑊣𑊖𑊚
Nandinagari	Nāgarī	7th century	Historically used to write Sanskrit in southern India	Nand	U+119A0–U+119FF	𑧁𑧞𑦿𑧒𑧁𑧑𑦰𑧈𑧓
Newar	Nepal	10th century	Newar, Sanskrit, Maithili	Newa	U+11400–U+1147F	𑐣𑐾𑐥𑐵𑐮 𑐮𑐶𑐥𑐶
New Tai Lue	Tai Tham	1950s	Tai Lü language	Talu	U+1980–U+19DF	ᦟᦲᧅᦷᦎᦺᦑ
Odia	Siddhaṃ	13th century	Odia language	Orya	U+0B00–U+0B7F	ଓଡ଼ିଆ ଅକ୍ଷର
ʼPhags-pa	Tibetan	13th century	Historically used during the Mongol Yuan dynasty.	Phag	U+A840–U+A87F	ꡖꡍꡂꡛ ꡌ
Rejang	Kawi	18th century	Rejang language, mostly obsolete	Rjng	U+A930–U+A95F	ꥆꤰ꥓ꤼꤽ ꤽꥍꤺꥏ
Saurashtra	Grantha	20th century	Saurashtra language, mostly obsolete	Saur	U+A880–U+A8DF	ꢱꣃꢬꢵꢰ꣄ꢜ꣄ꢬꢵ
Sharada	Gupta	8th century	Was used for writing Sanskrit and Kashmiri	Shrd	U+11180–U111DF, U+11B60–U11B7F	𑆯𑆳𑆫𑆢𑆳
Siddham	Gupta	7th century	Was used for writing Sanskrit	Sidd	U+11580–U+115FF	𑖭𑖰𑖟𑖿𑖠𑖽
Sinhala	Brahmi	4th century	Sinhala language	Sinh	U+0D80–U+0DFF, U+111E0–U+111FF	ශුද්ධ සිංහල
Sundanese	Kawi	14th century	Sundanese language	Sund	U+1B80–U+1BBF, U+1CC0–U+1CCF	ᮃᮊ᮪ᮞᮛ ᮞᮥᮔ᮪ᮓ
Sylheti Nagari	Nagari	16th century	Historically used for writing the Sylheti language	Sylo	U+A800–U+A82F	ꠍꠤꠟꠐꠤ ꠘꠣꠉꠞꠤ
Tagbanwa	Kawi	14th century	Various languages of Palawan, nearly extinct	Tagb	U+1760–U+177F	ᝦᝪᝨᝯ
Tai Le	Mon	13th century	Tai Nüa language	Tale	U+1950–U+197F	ᥖᥭᥰᥖᥬᥳᥑᥨᥒᥰ
Tai Tham	Mon	13th century	Northern Thai language, Tai Lü language, Khün language	Lana	U+1A20–U+1AAF	ᨲᩫ᩠ᩅᨾᩮᩬᩥᨦ
Tai Viet	Thai	16th century	Tai Dam language	Tavt	U+AA80–U+AADF	ꪼꪕꪒꪾ
Tai Yo/Lai Tay	Khmer	16th century	Tai Yo language	Tayo	U+1E6C0–U1E6FF	
Takri	Sharada	16th century	Was used for writing Chambeali and other languages	Takr	U+11680–U+116CF	𑚔𑚭𑚊𑚤𑚯
Tamil	Pallava	2nd century	Tamil language	Taml	U+0B80–U+0BFF, U+11FC0–U+11FFF	தமிழ் அரிச்சுவடி
Telugu	Telugu-Kannada	5th century	Telugu language	Telu	U+0C00–U+0C7F	తెలుగు లిపి
Thai	Sukhothai	13th century	Thai language	Thai	U+0E00–U+0E7F	อักษรไทย
Tibetan	Gupta	8th century	Classical Tibetan, Dzongkha, Ladakhi language	Tibt	U+0F00–U+0FFF	བོད་ཡིག་
Tigalari/Tulu	Grantha	9th century	Tulu, Kannada, and Sanskrit	Tutg	U+11380–U113FF	𑎡𑎻𑎳𑎻𑎭𑎹𑎦𑎹
Tirhuta	Siddham	13th century	Historically used for the Maithili language	Tirh	U+11480–U+114DF	𑒞𑒱𑒩𑒯𑒳𑒞𑒰

== Gallery ==
=== Northern Brahmi ===
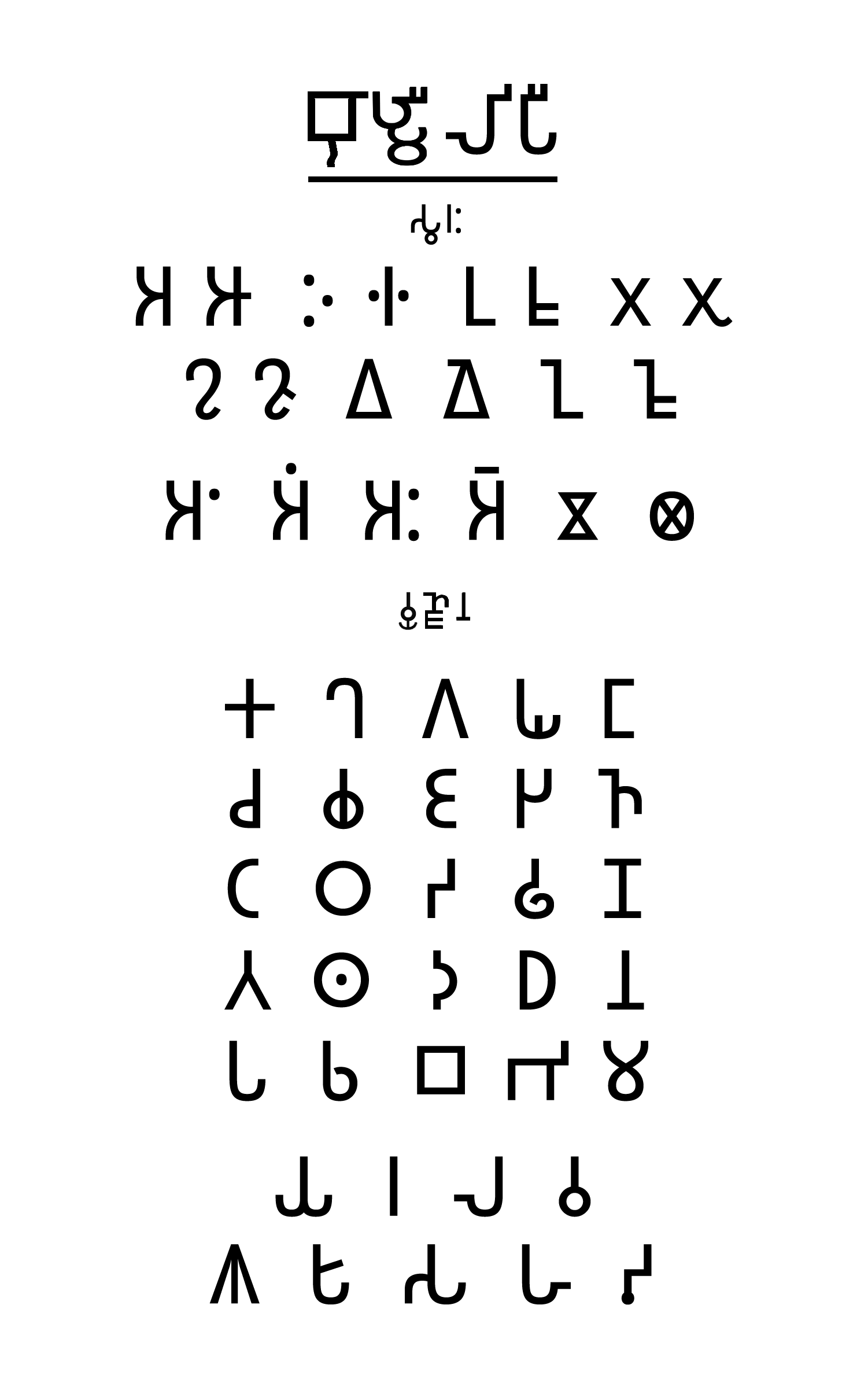
Ashokan Brahmi Varnamala in modern typface

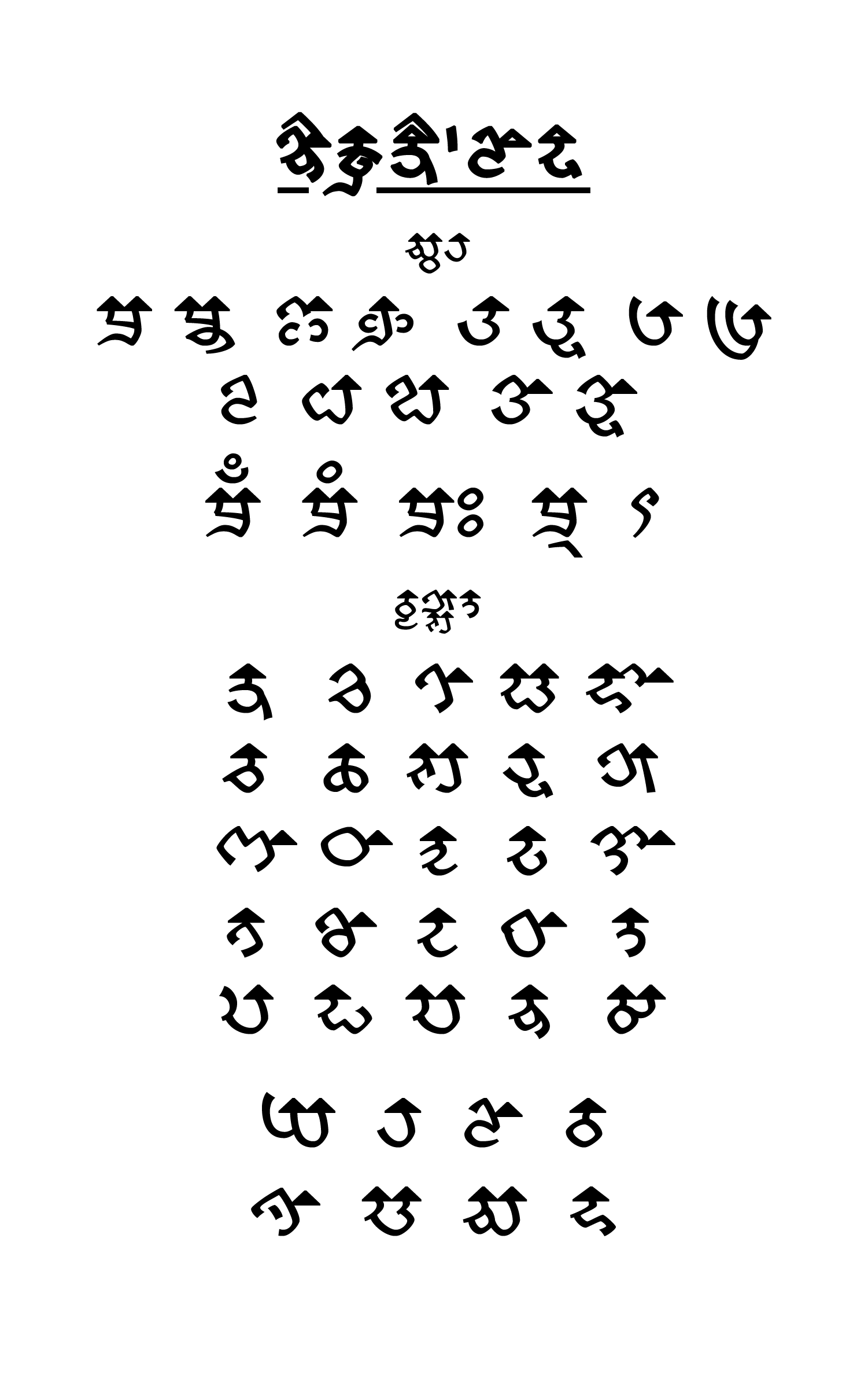
Bhaiksuki Varnamala

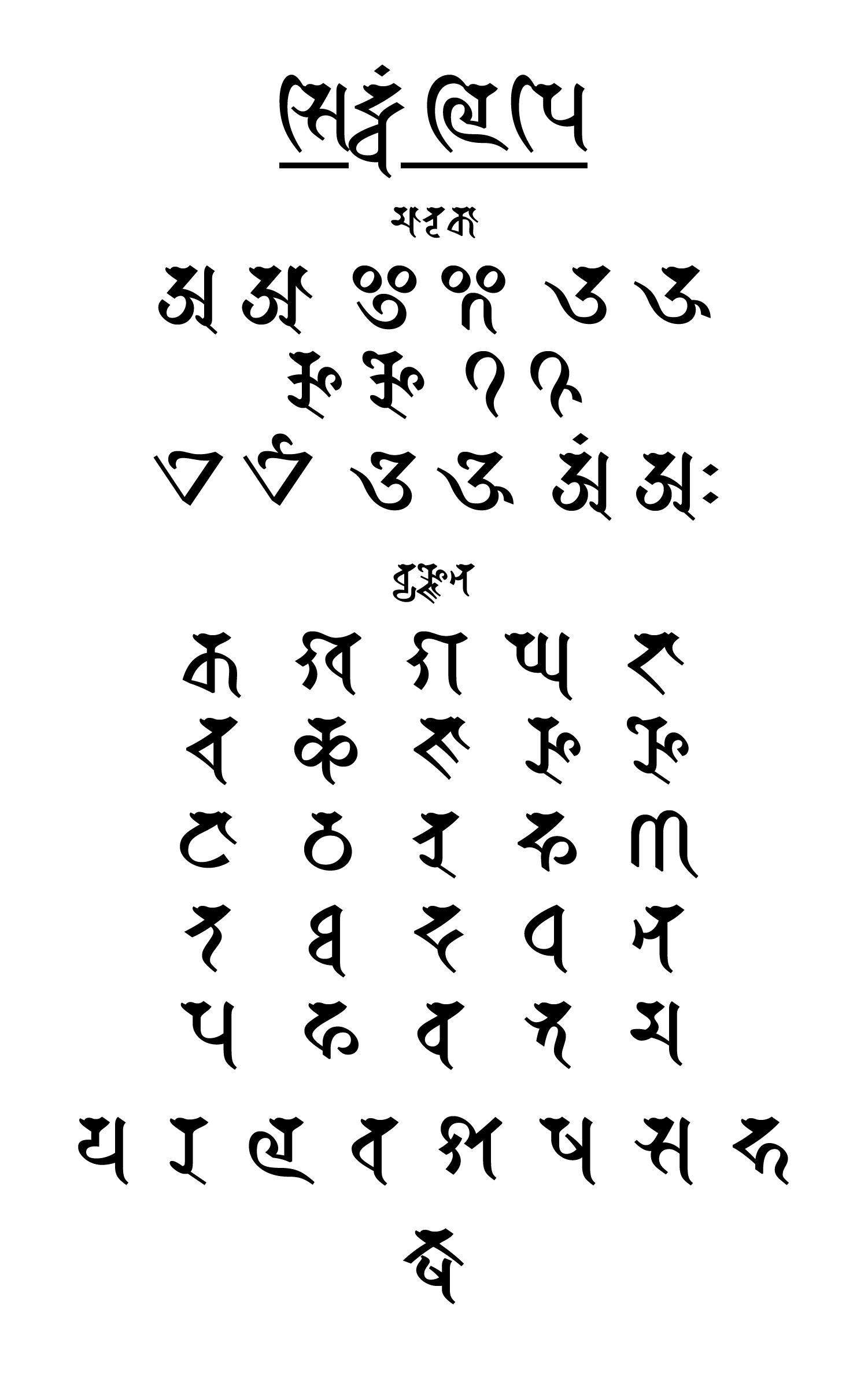
Siddhaṃ Varnamala

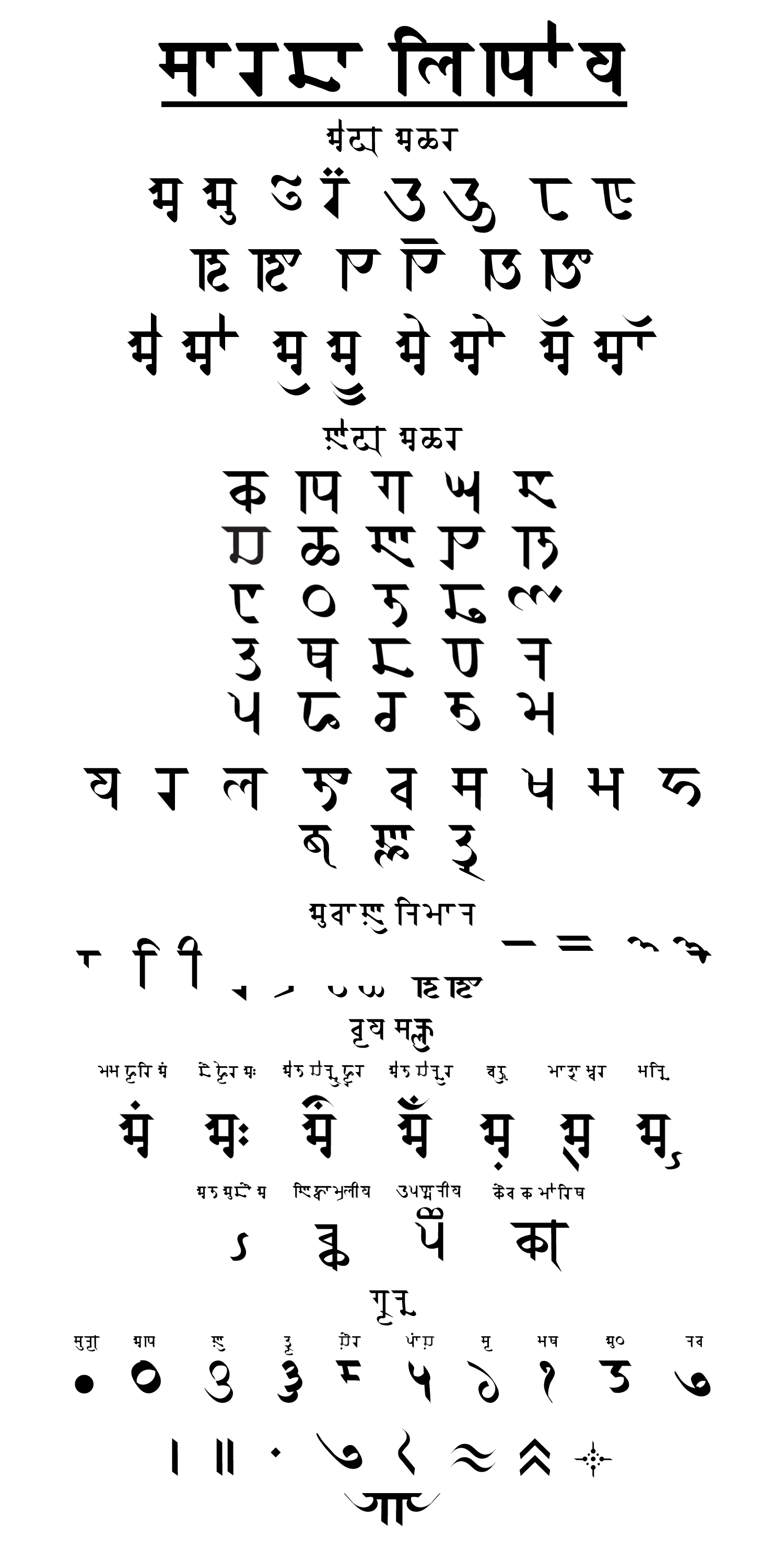
Śāradā Varnamala

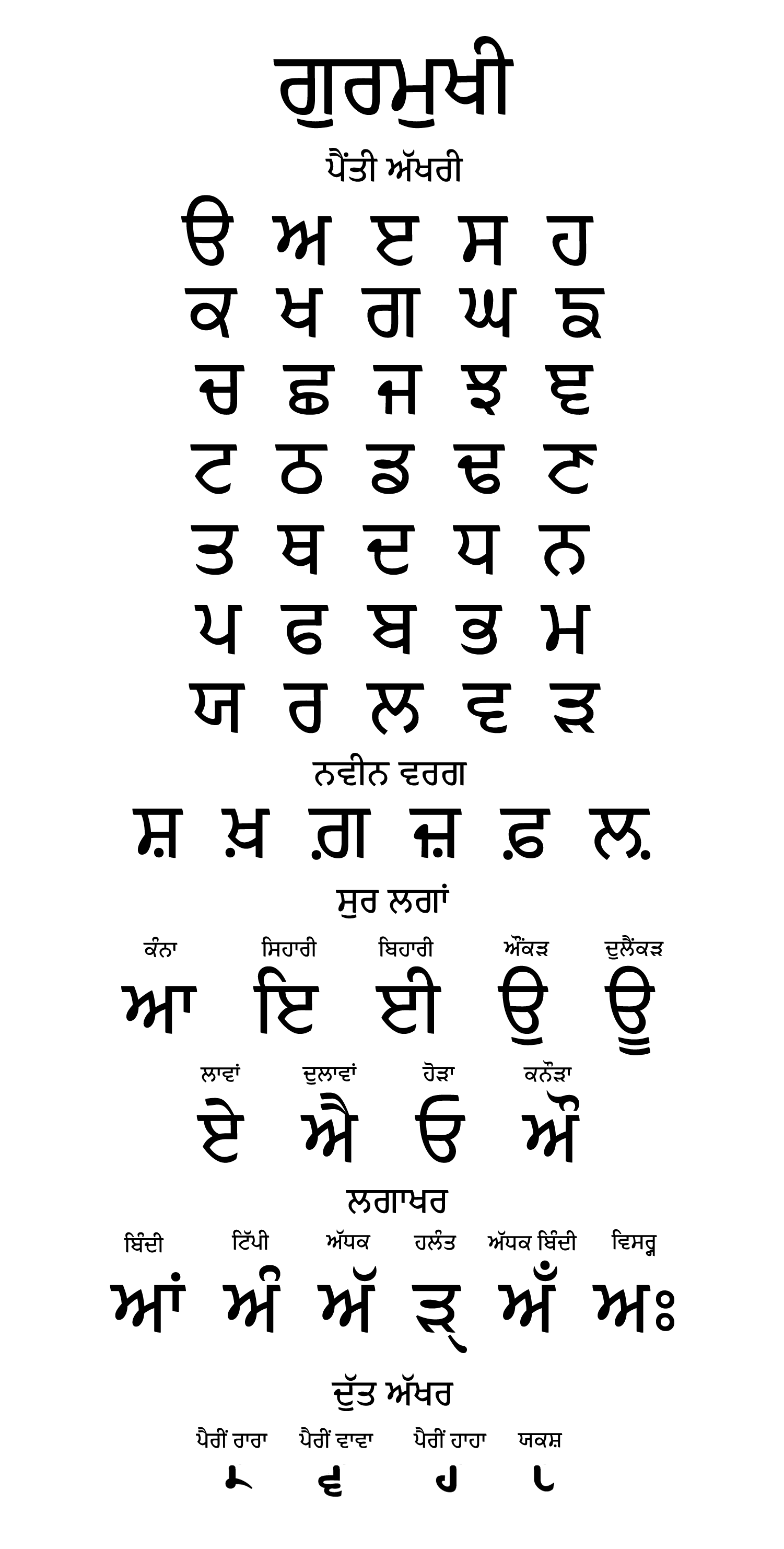
Gurmukhī Varnamala

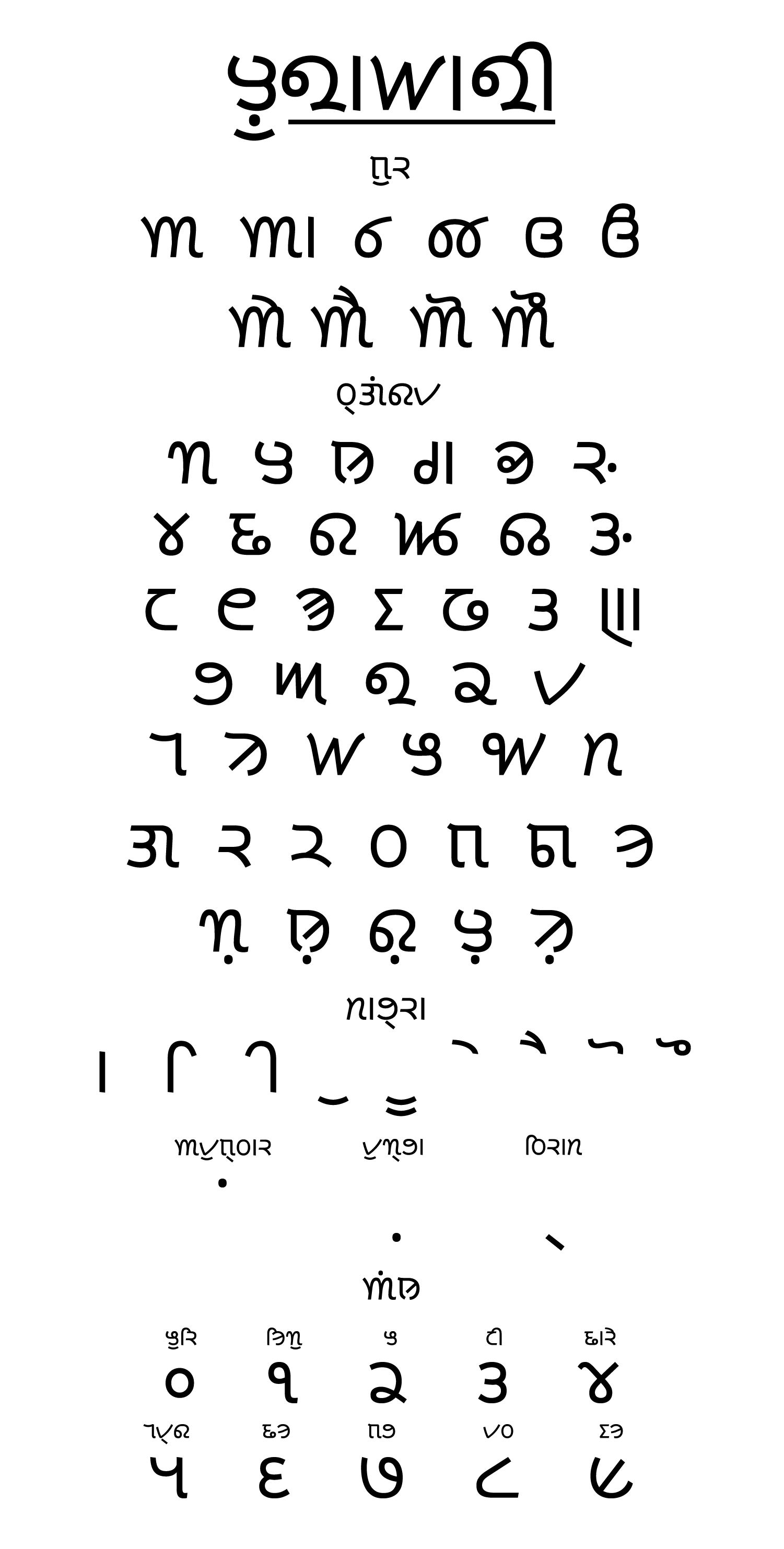
Khudabadi Varnamala

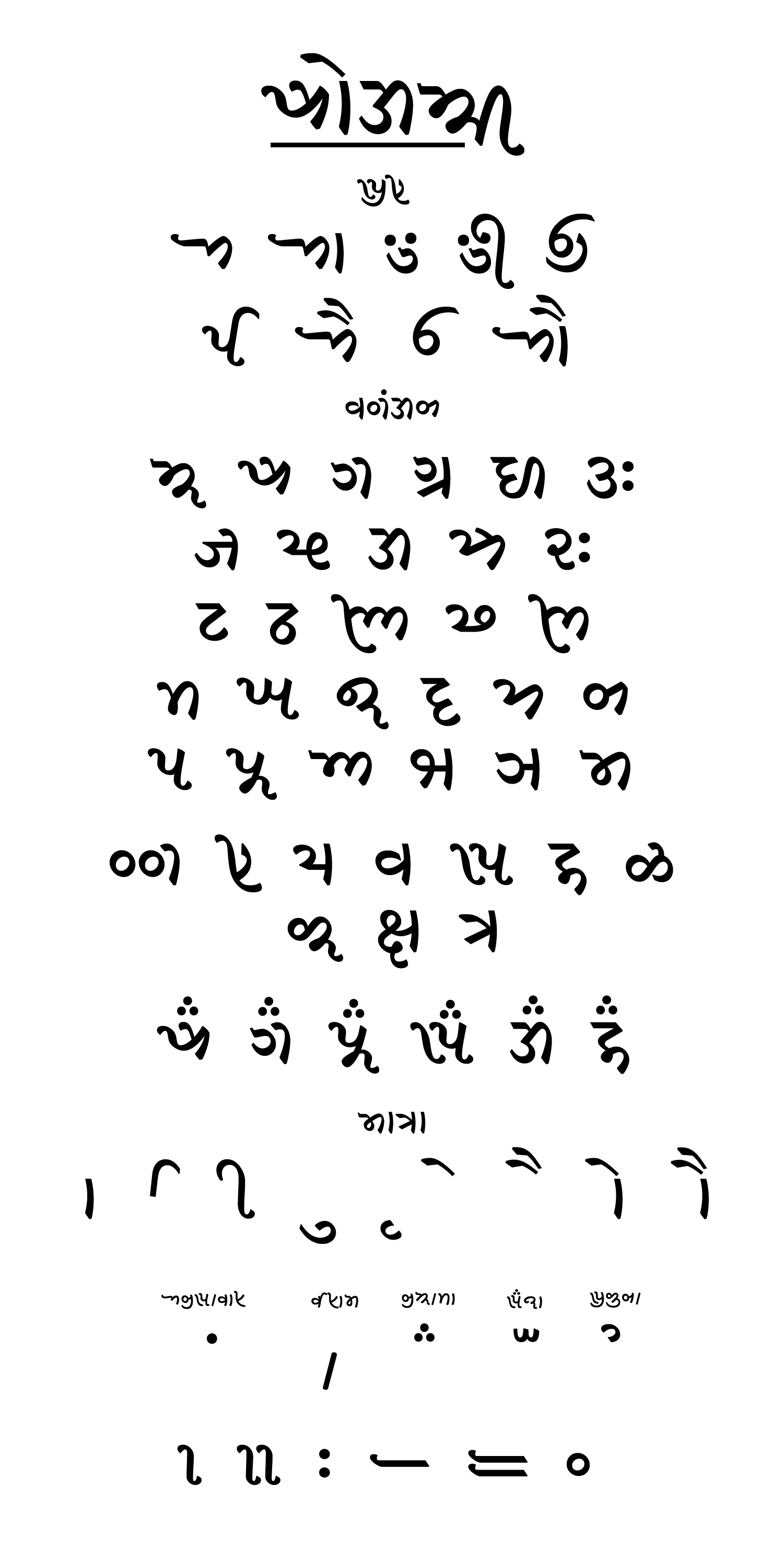
Khojki Varnamala

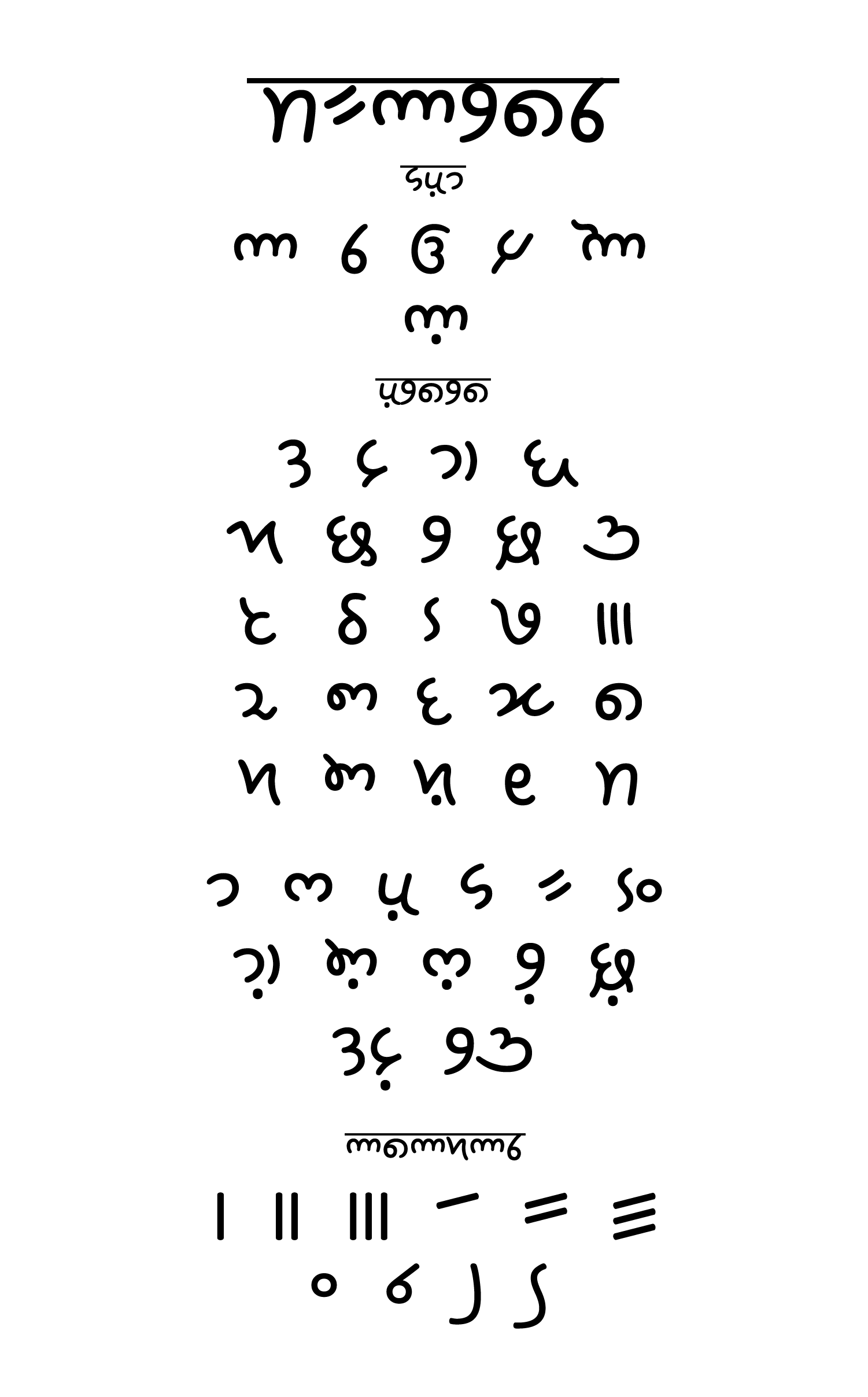
Mahajani Varnamala

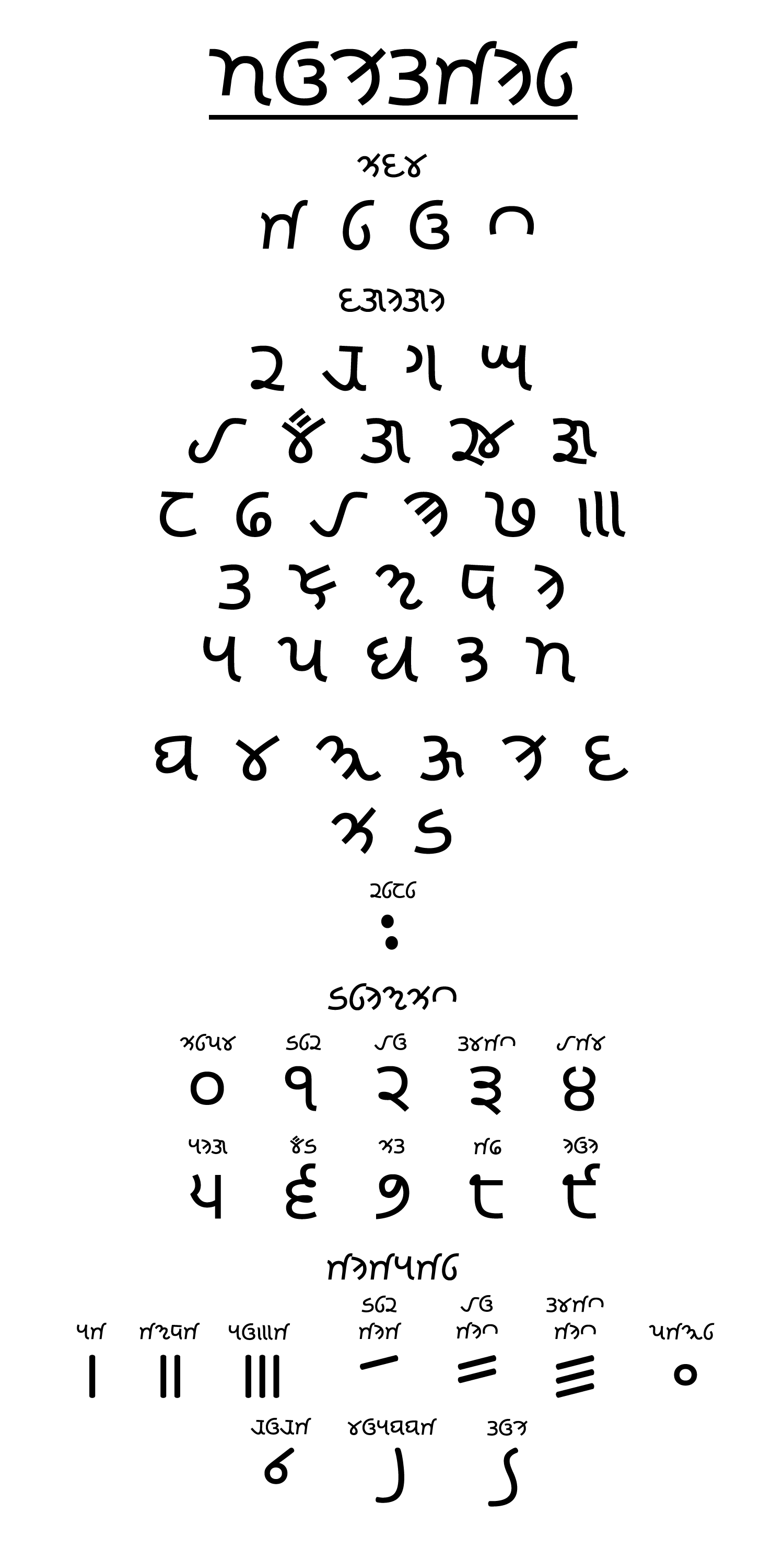
Multani Varnamala

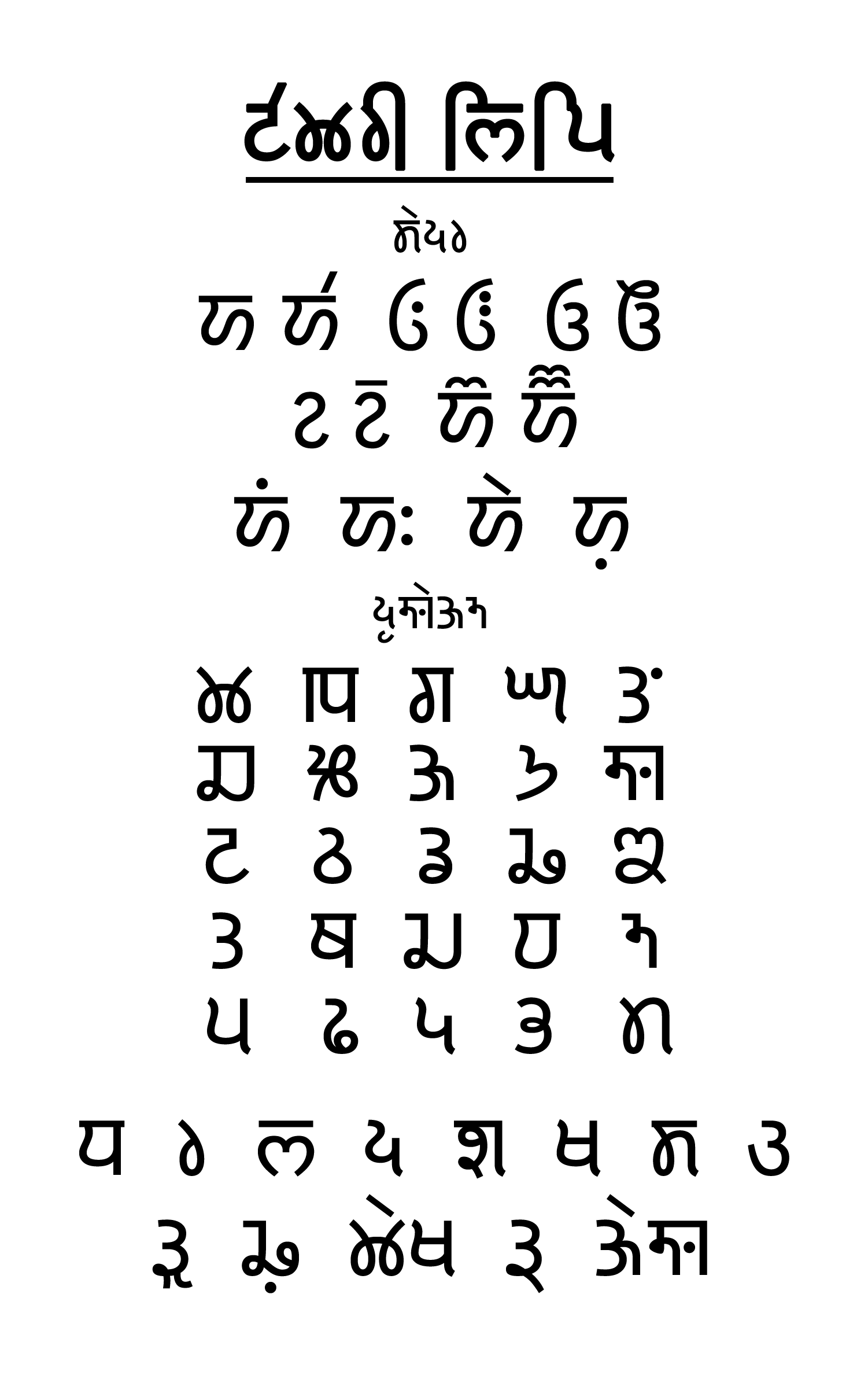
Standardised Takri Varnamala in Chamba style

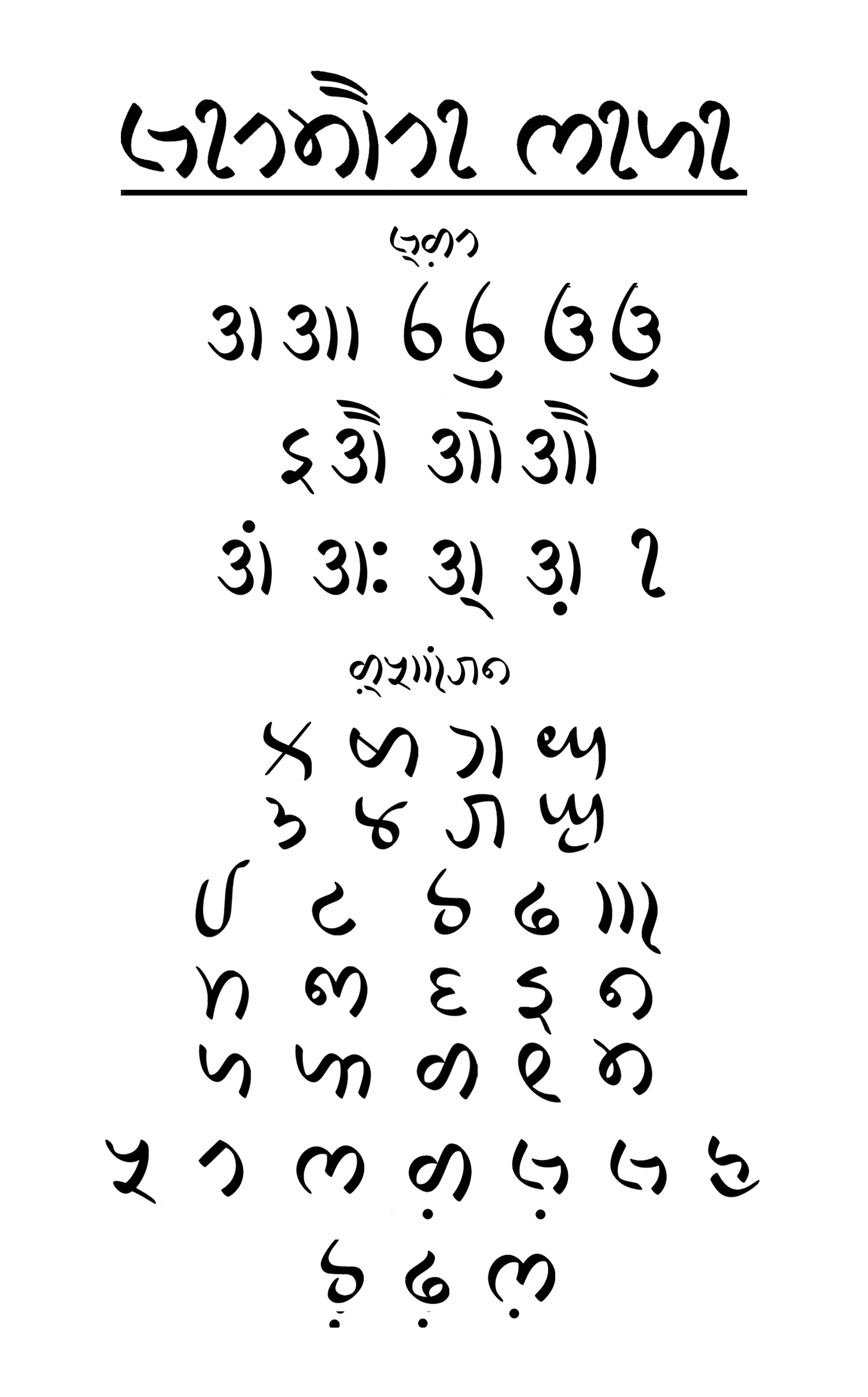
Takri Varnamala in Sirmauri style

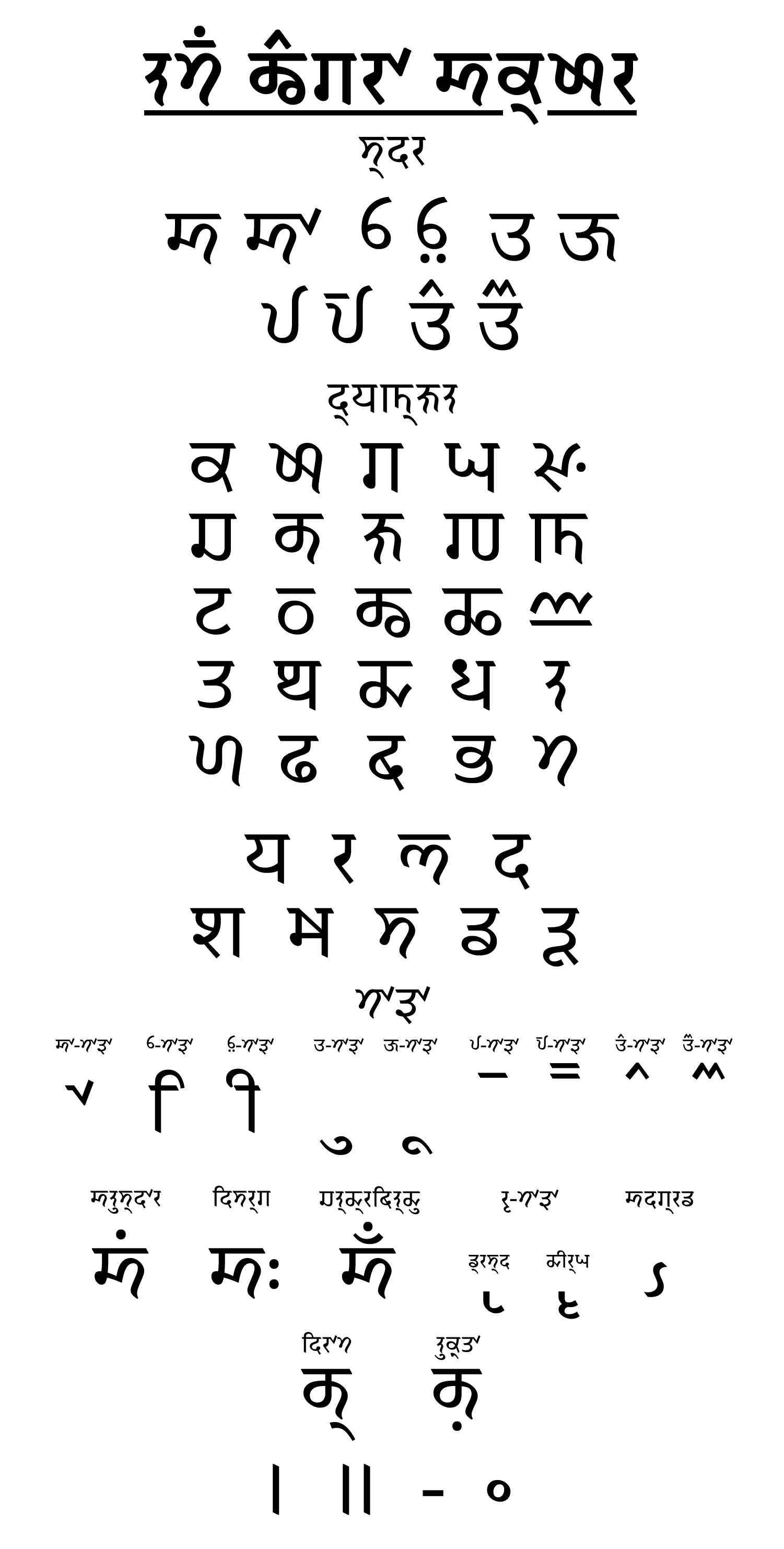
Dogri Varnamala

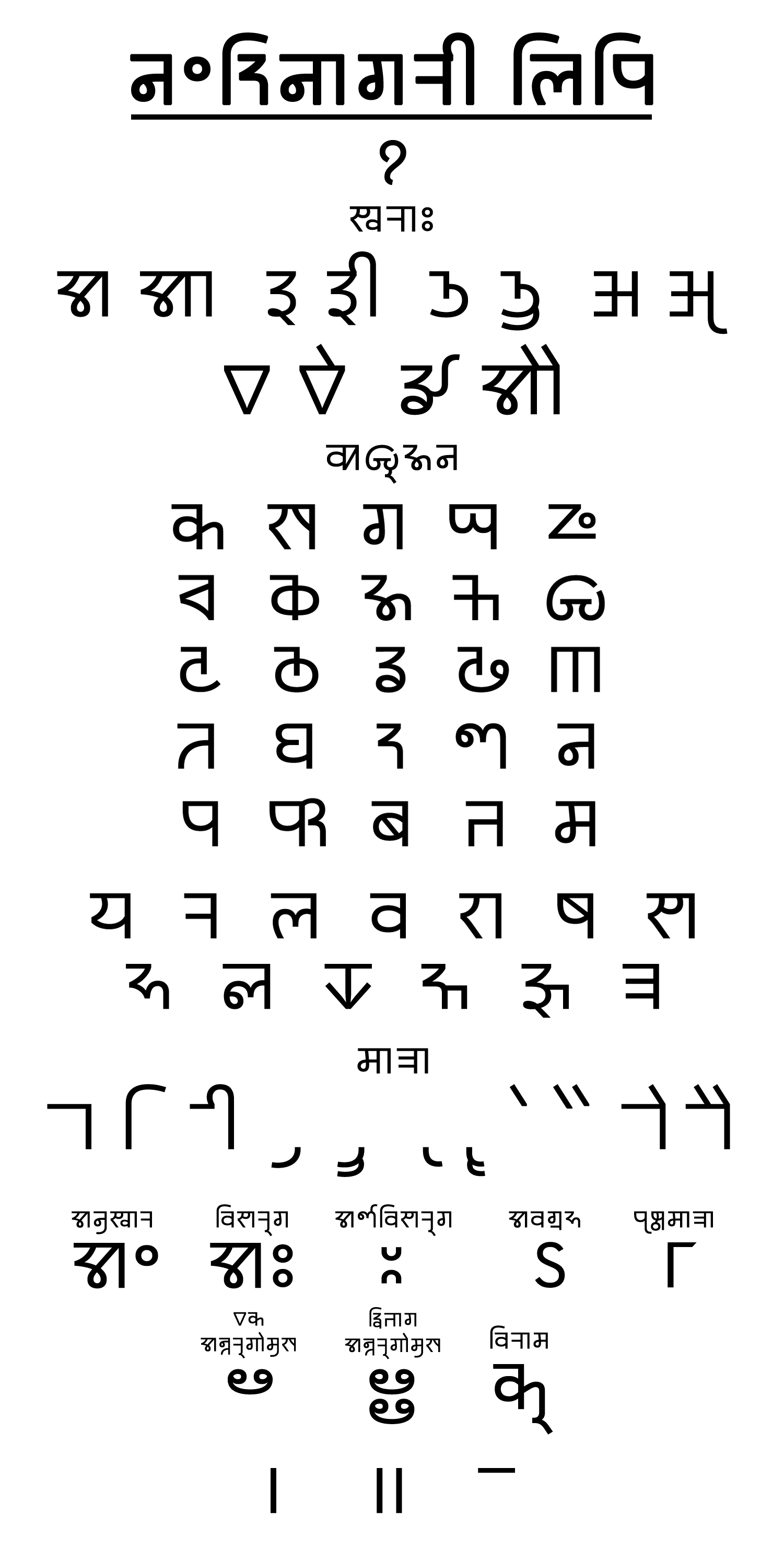
Nandināgarī Varnamala

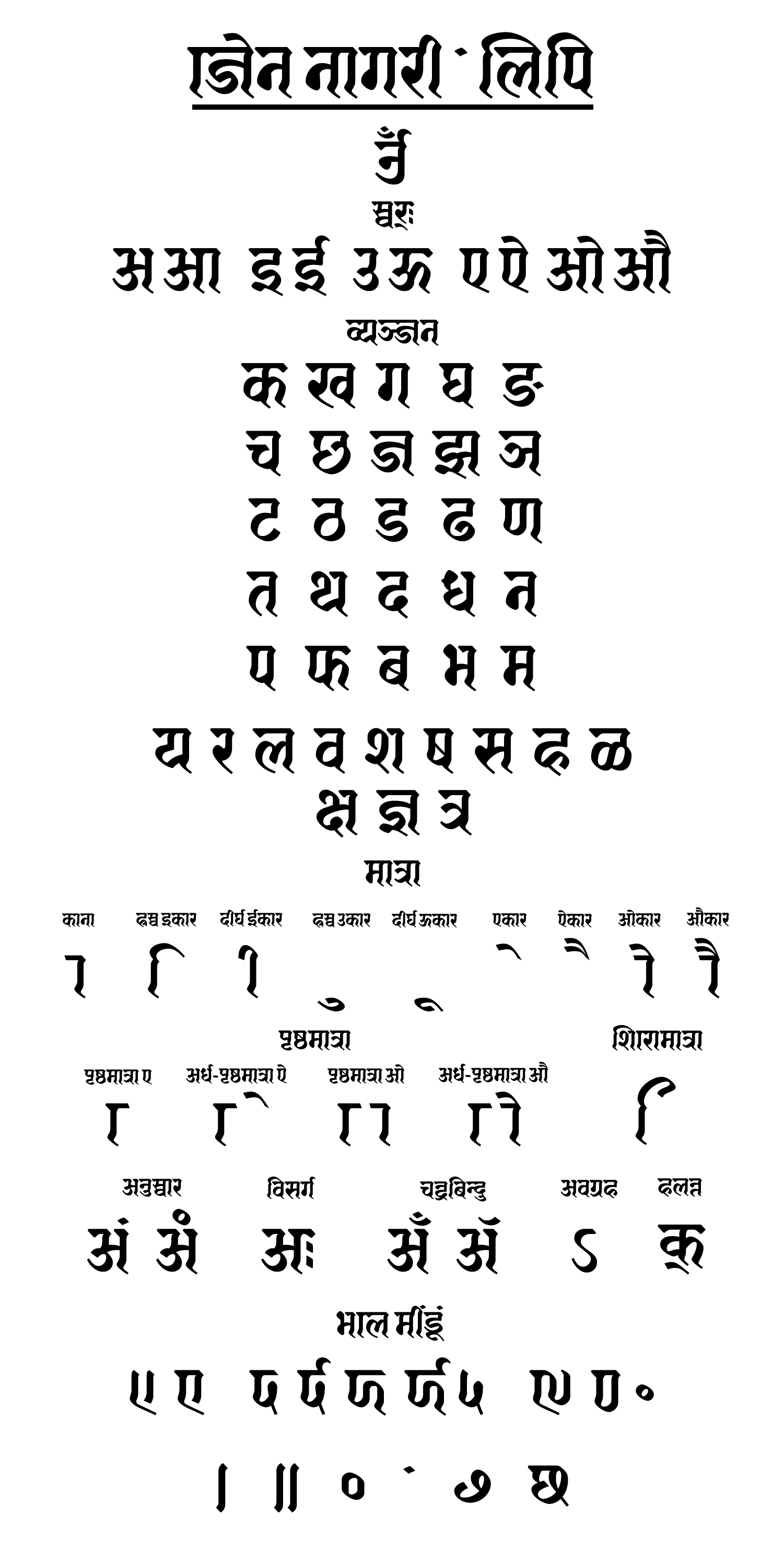
Jainanāgarī Varnamala (Distinct calligraphic variant used in Jain texts)

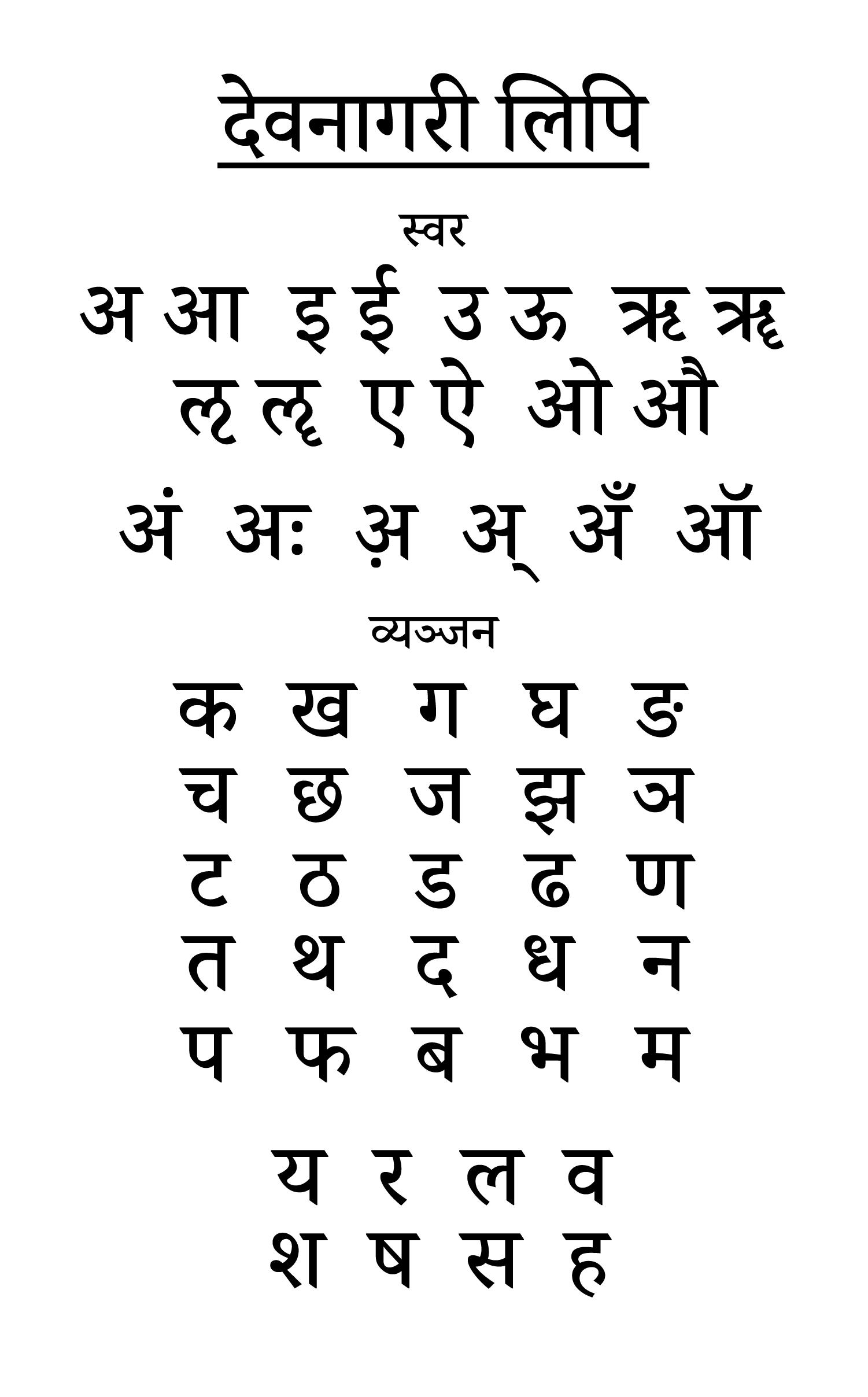
Standard Devanāgarī Varnamala

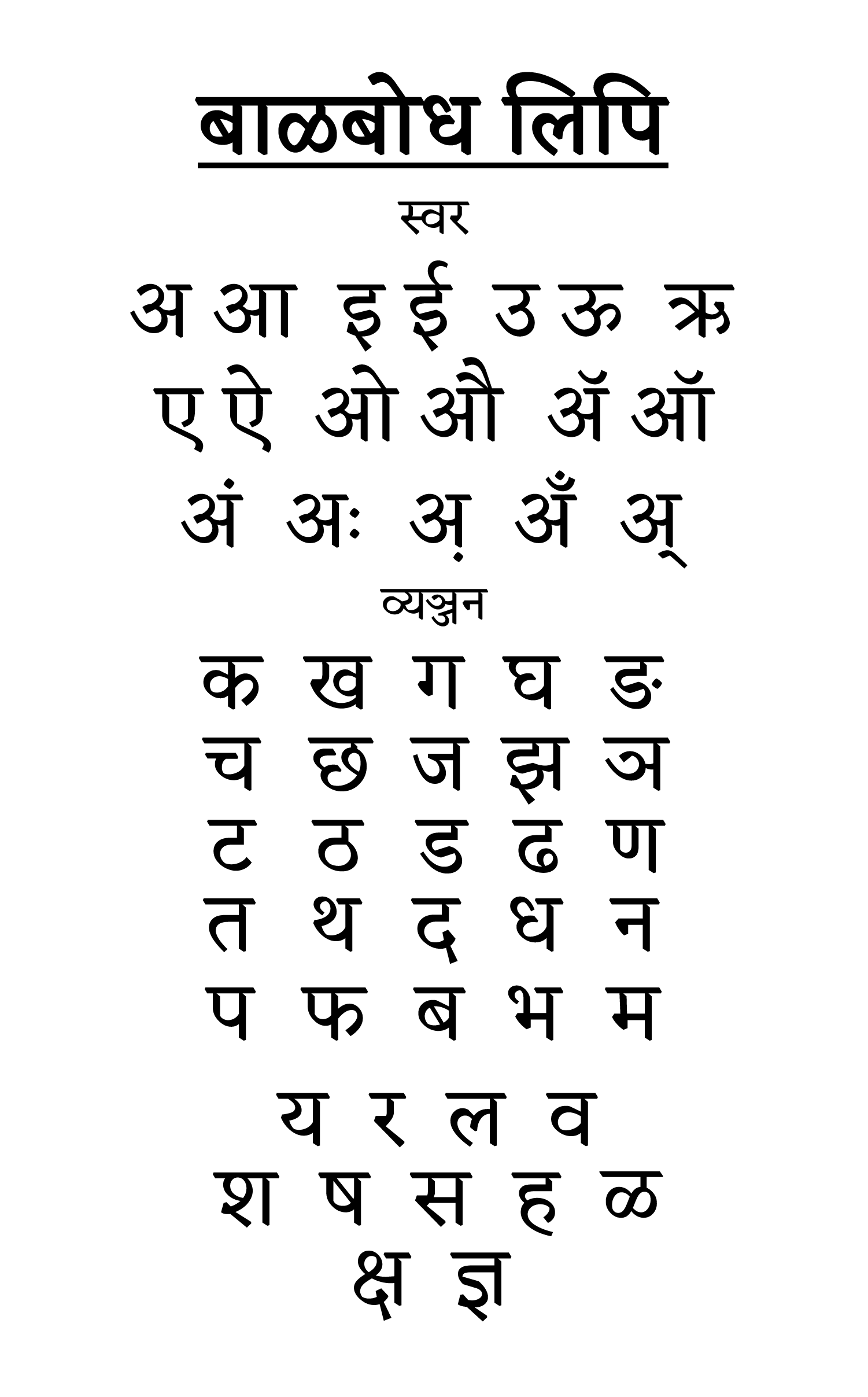
Balbodh Varnamala (variant of Devanāgarī used for Marathi)

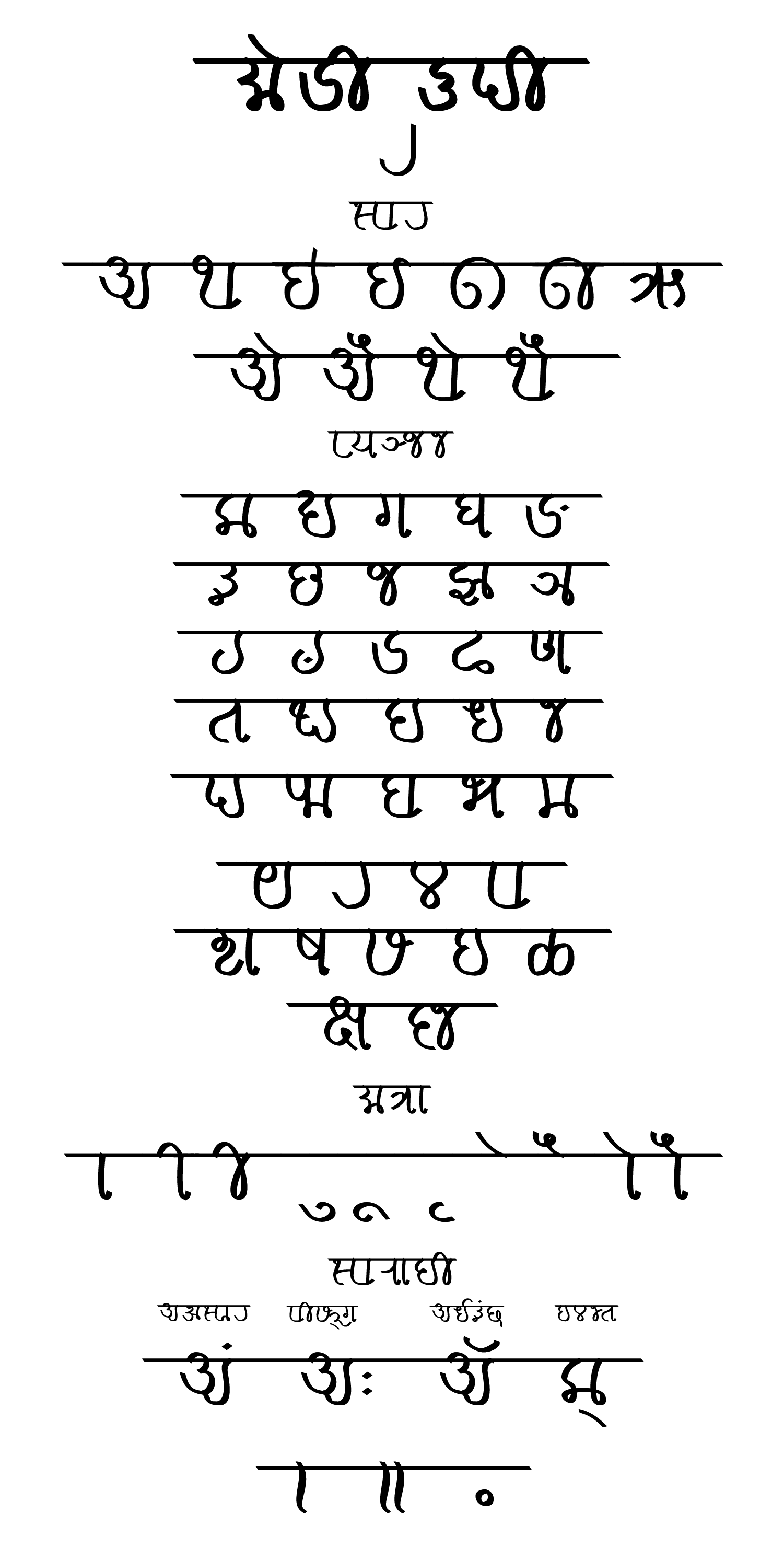
Modi Varnamala (traditional script used for Marathi)

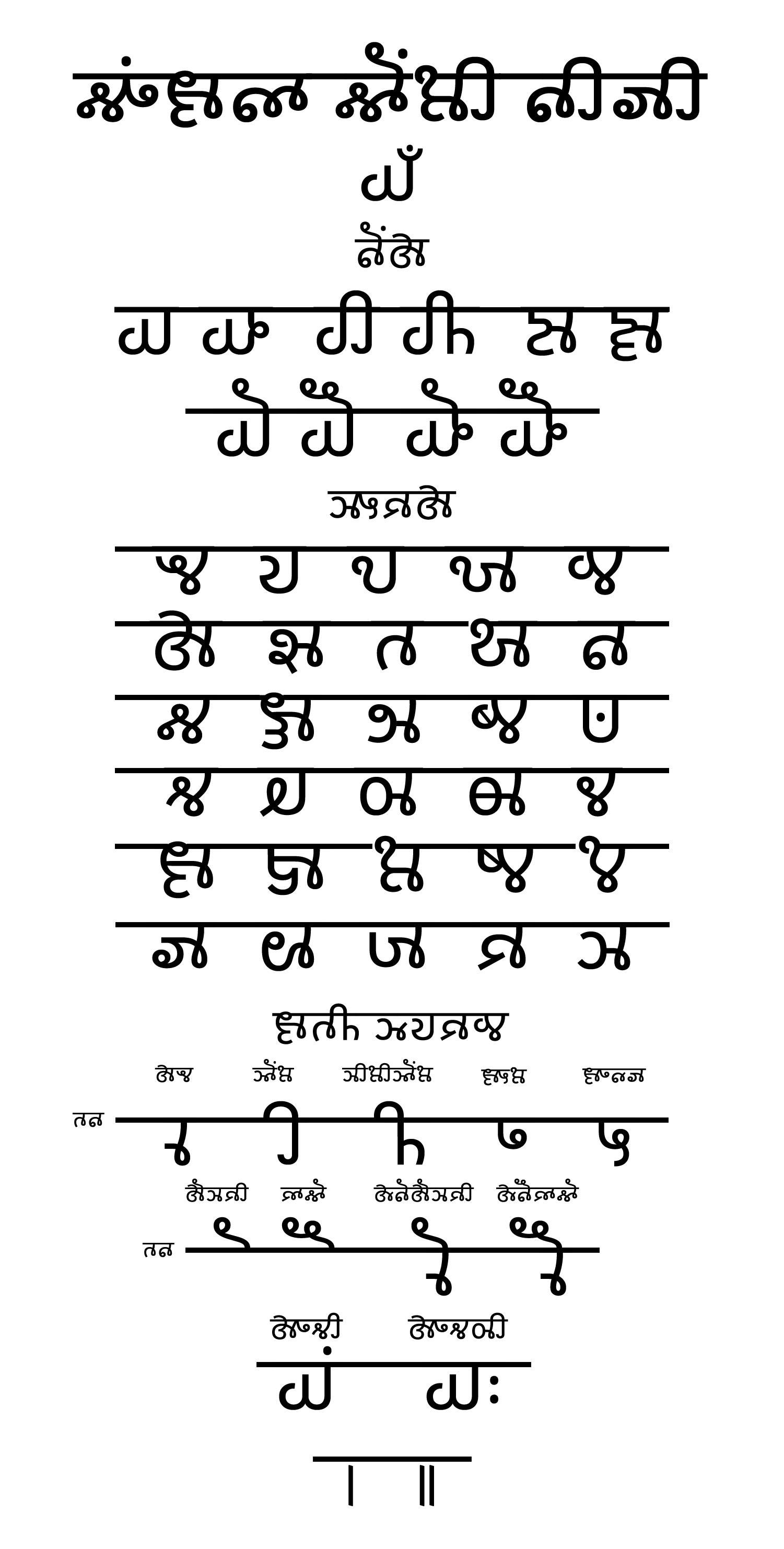
Gunjala Gondi Aksharamala (one among many scripts used for Gondi)

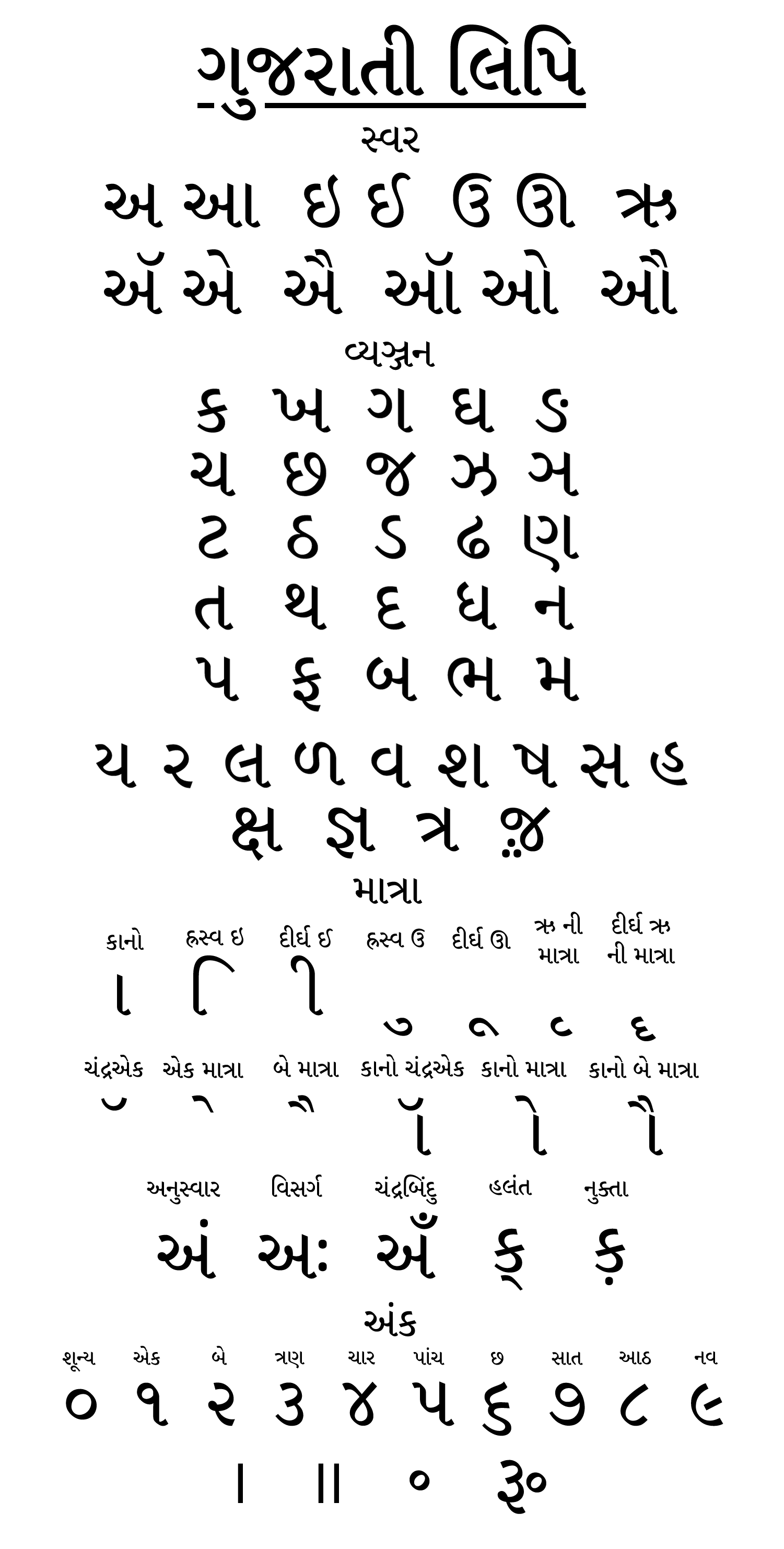
Gujarati Varnamala

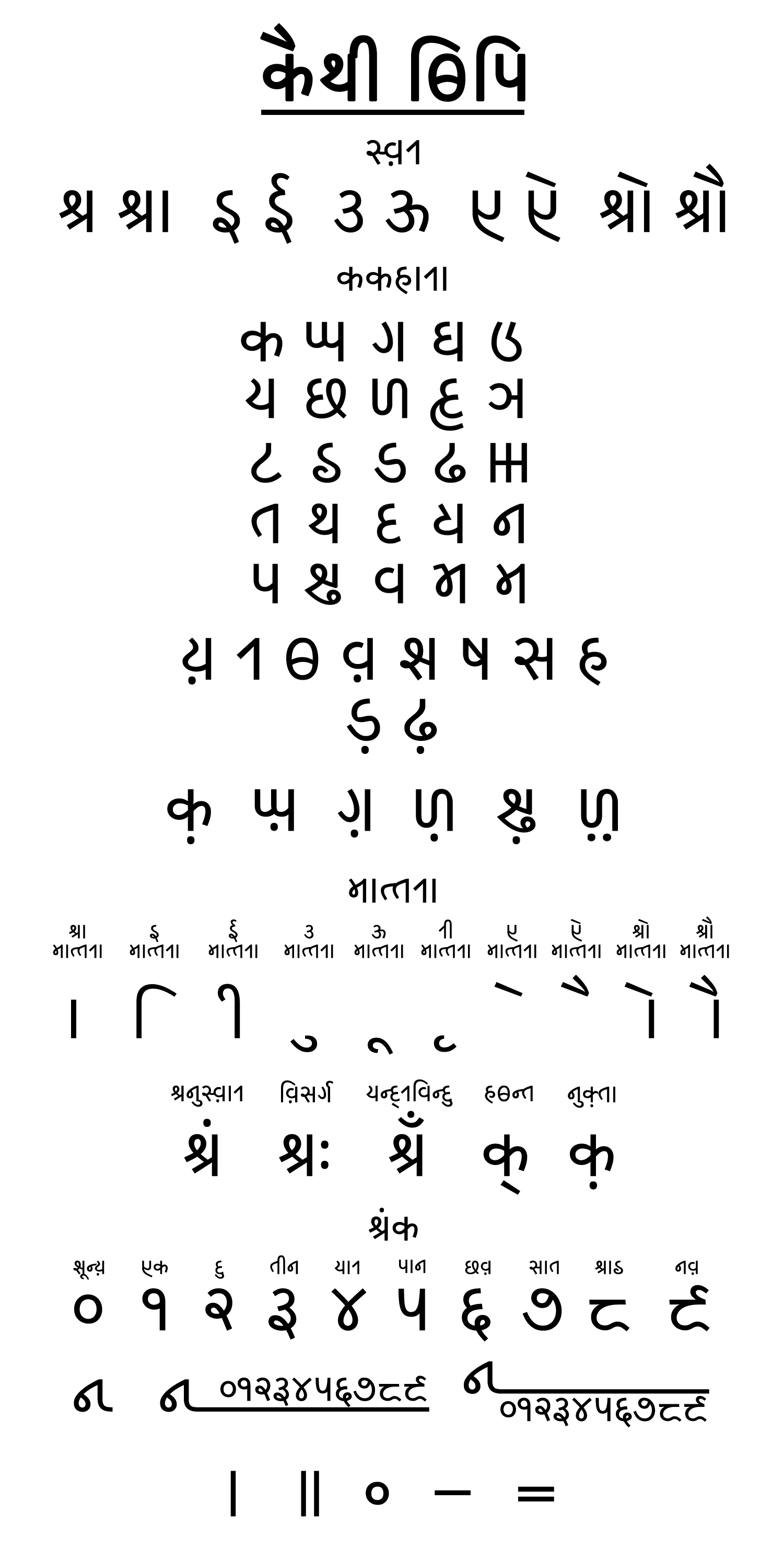
Kaithi Varnamala

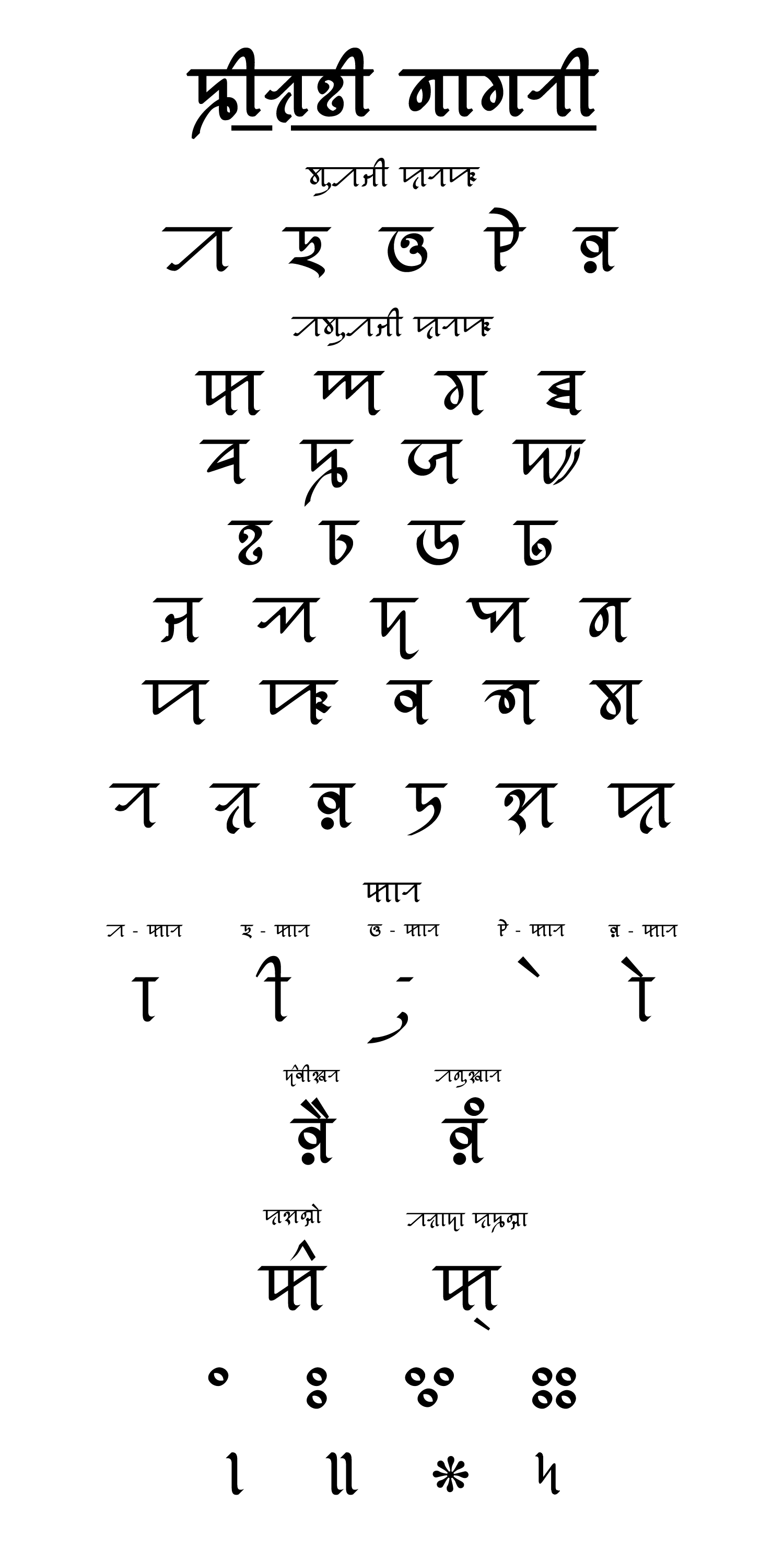
Sylheti Nagari Varnamala

Assamese Varnamala (traditional)

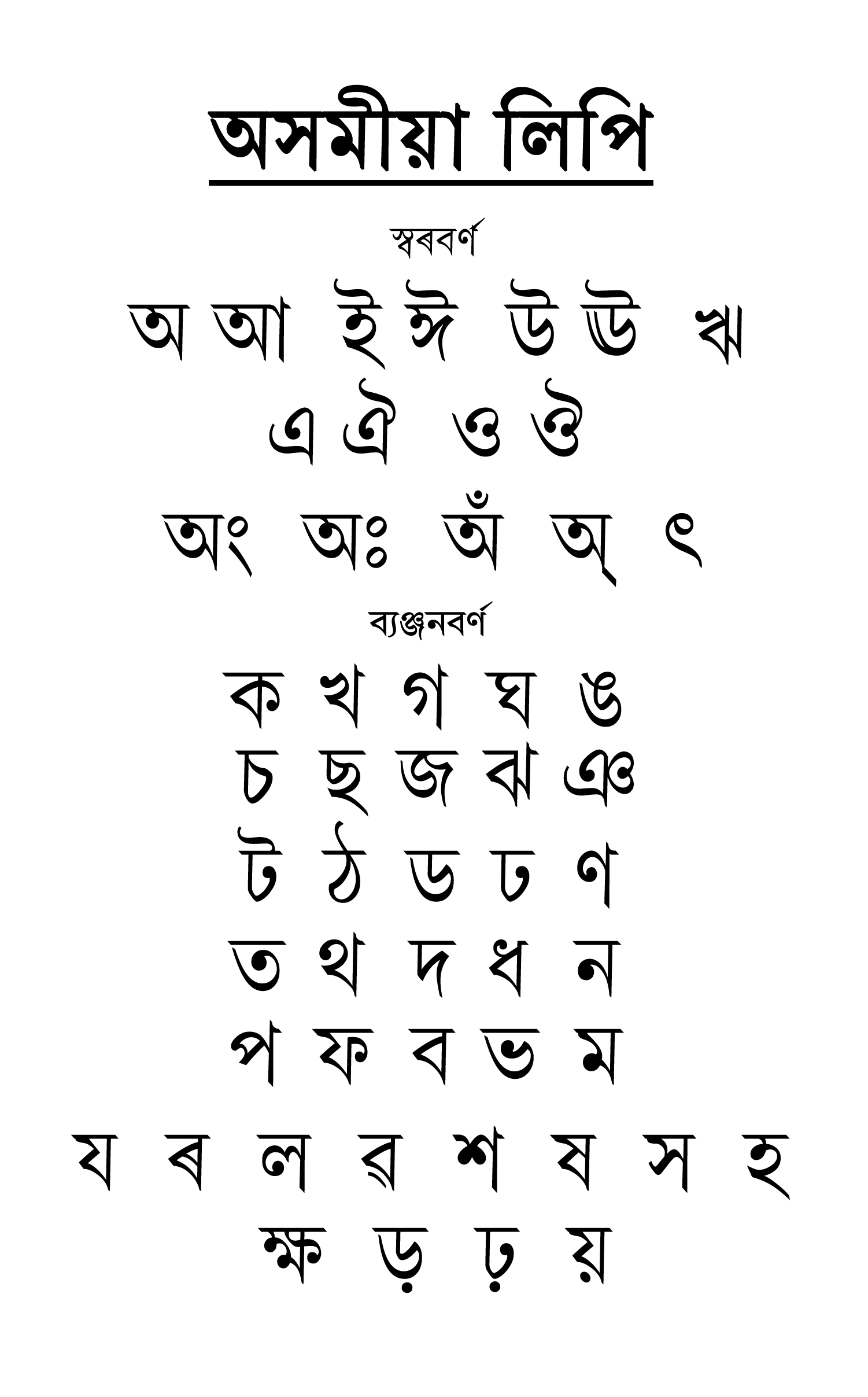
Assamese Varnamala (standard)

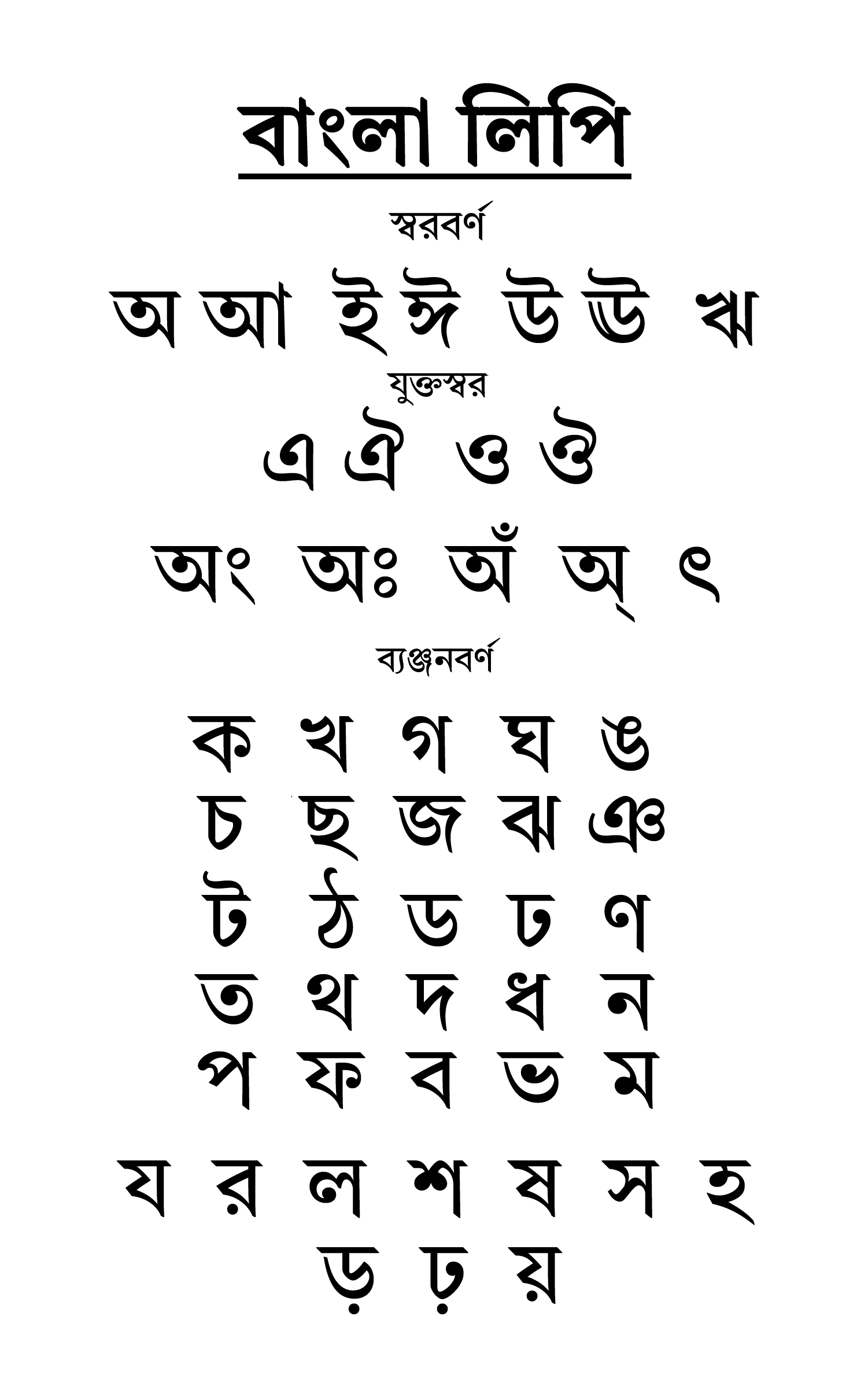
Bengali Varnamala

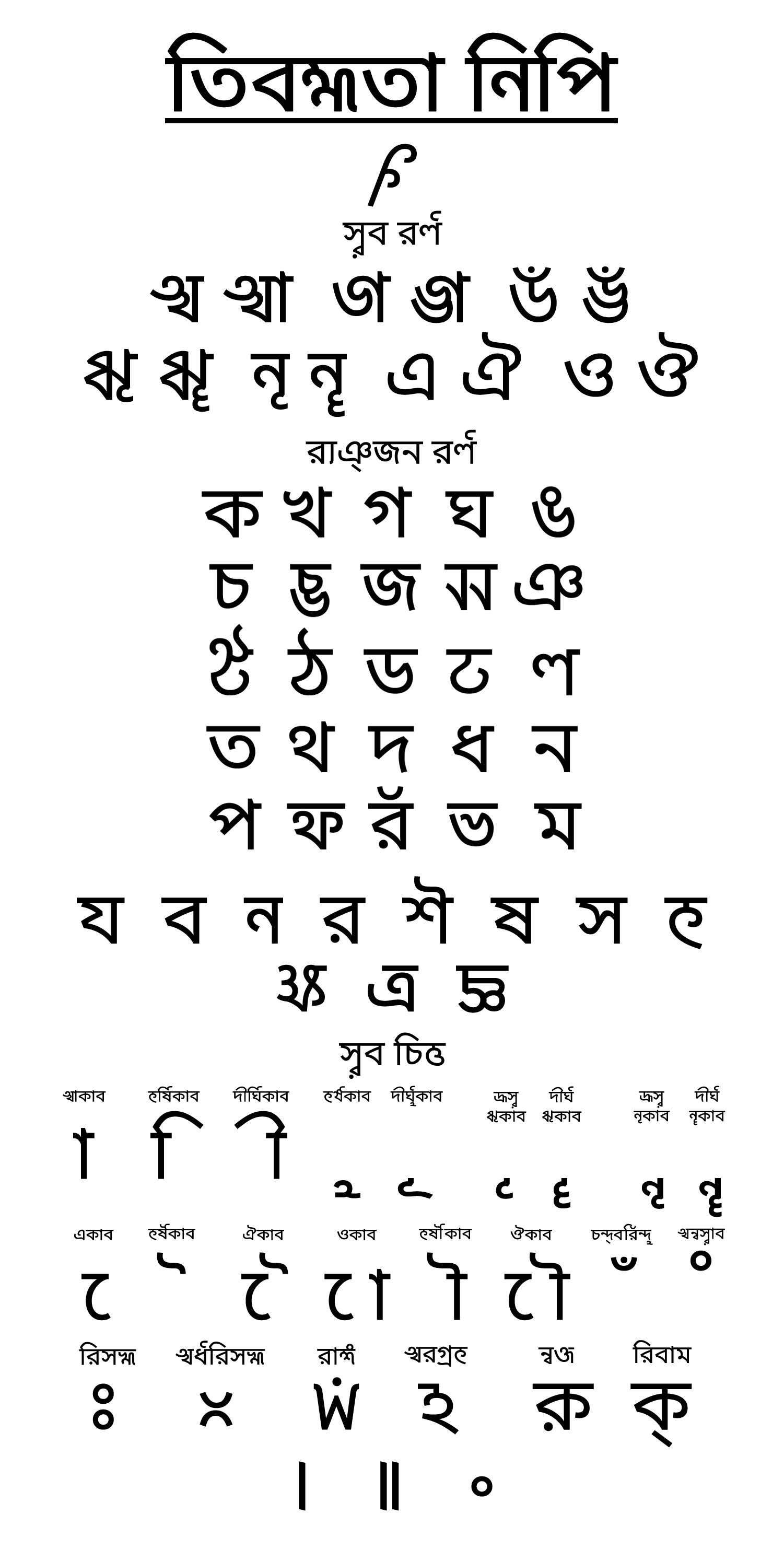
Tirhuta Varnamala

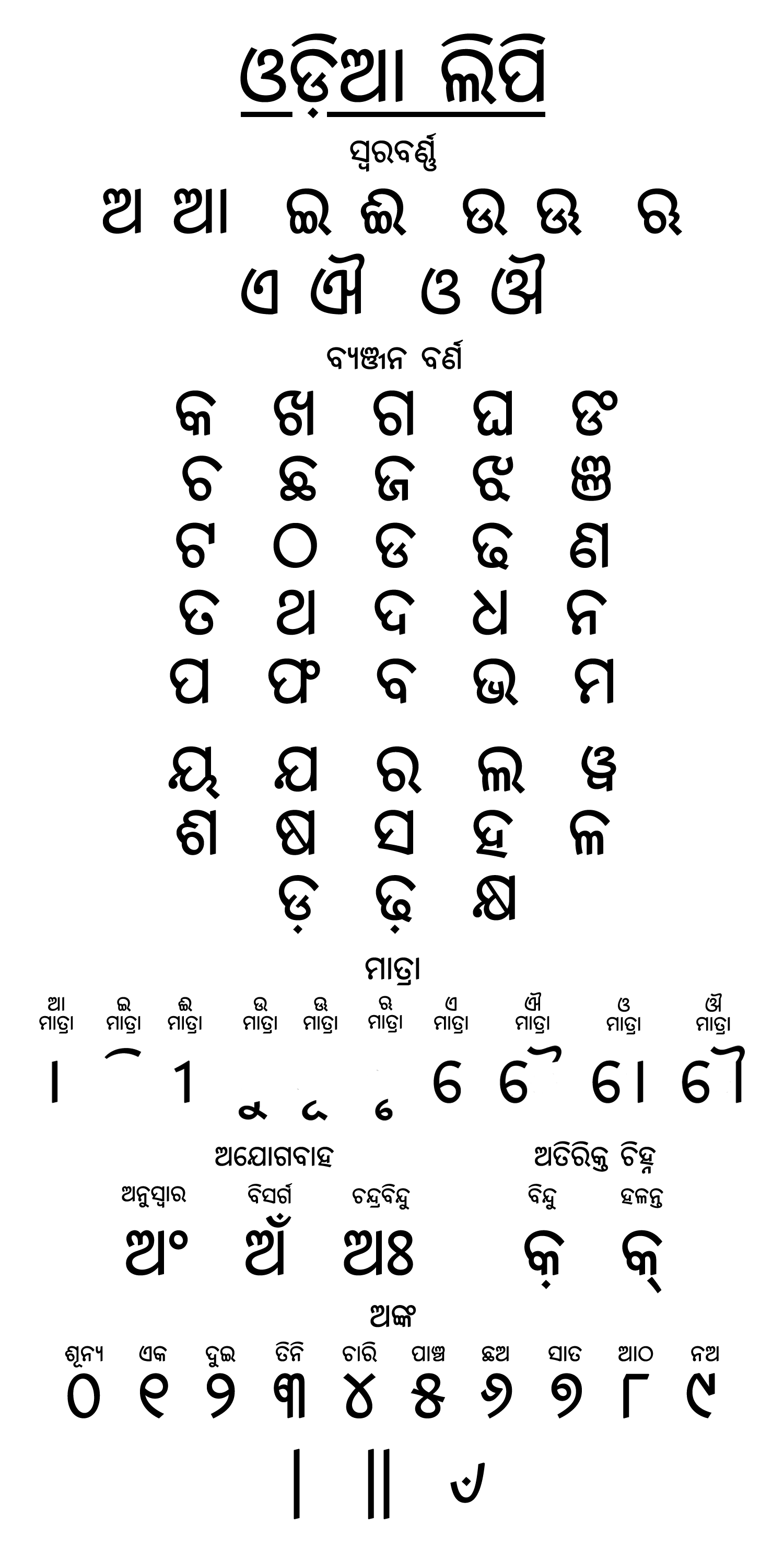
Odia Akshara

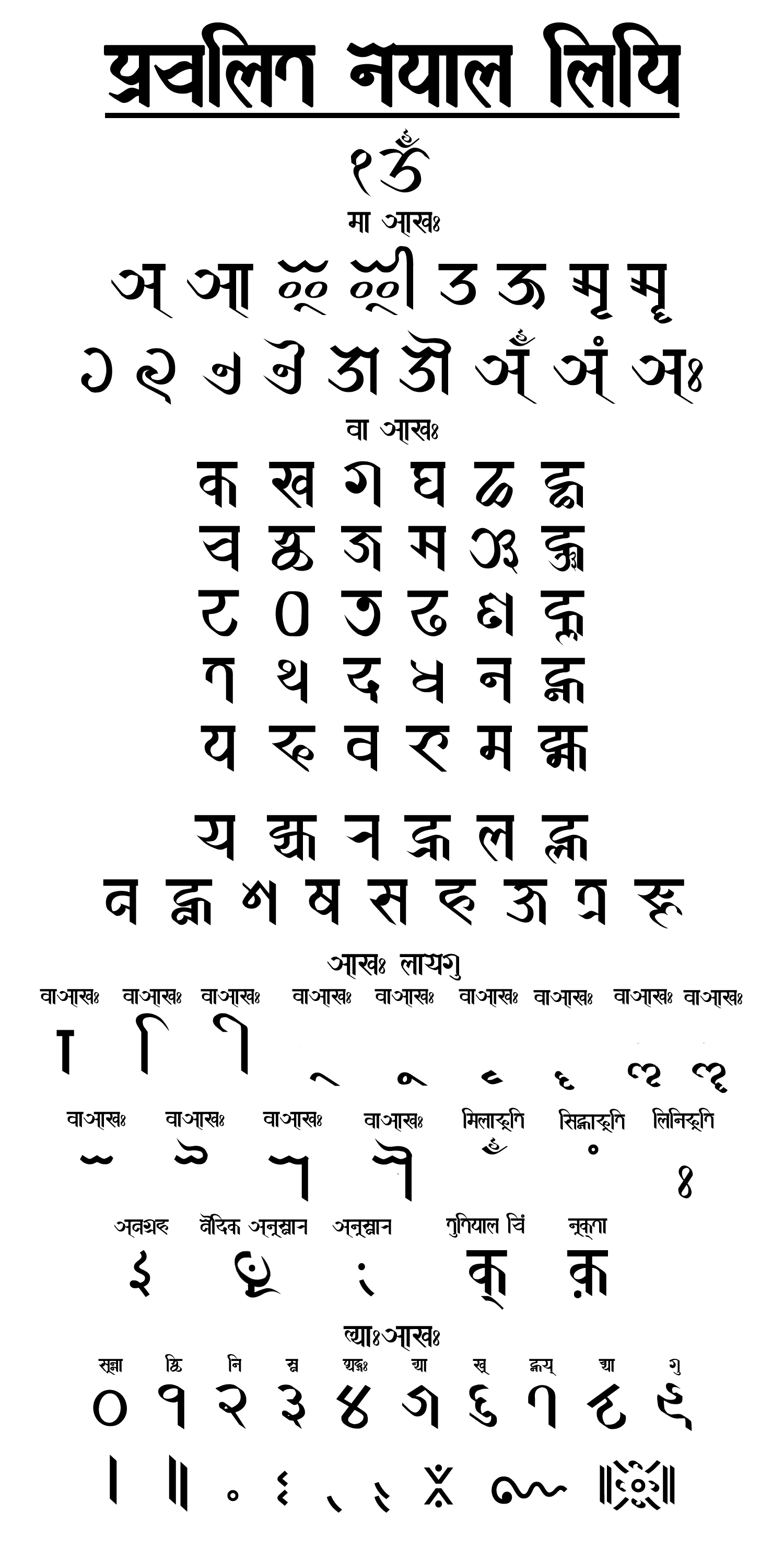
Prachalit Varnamala

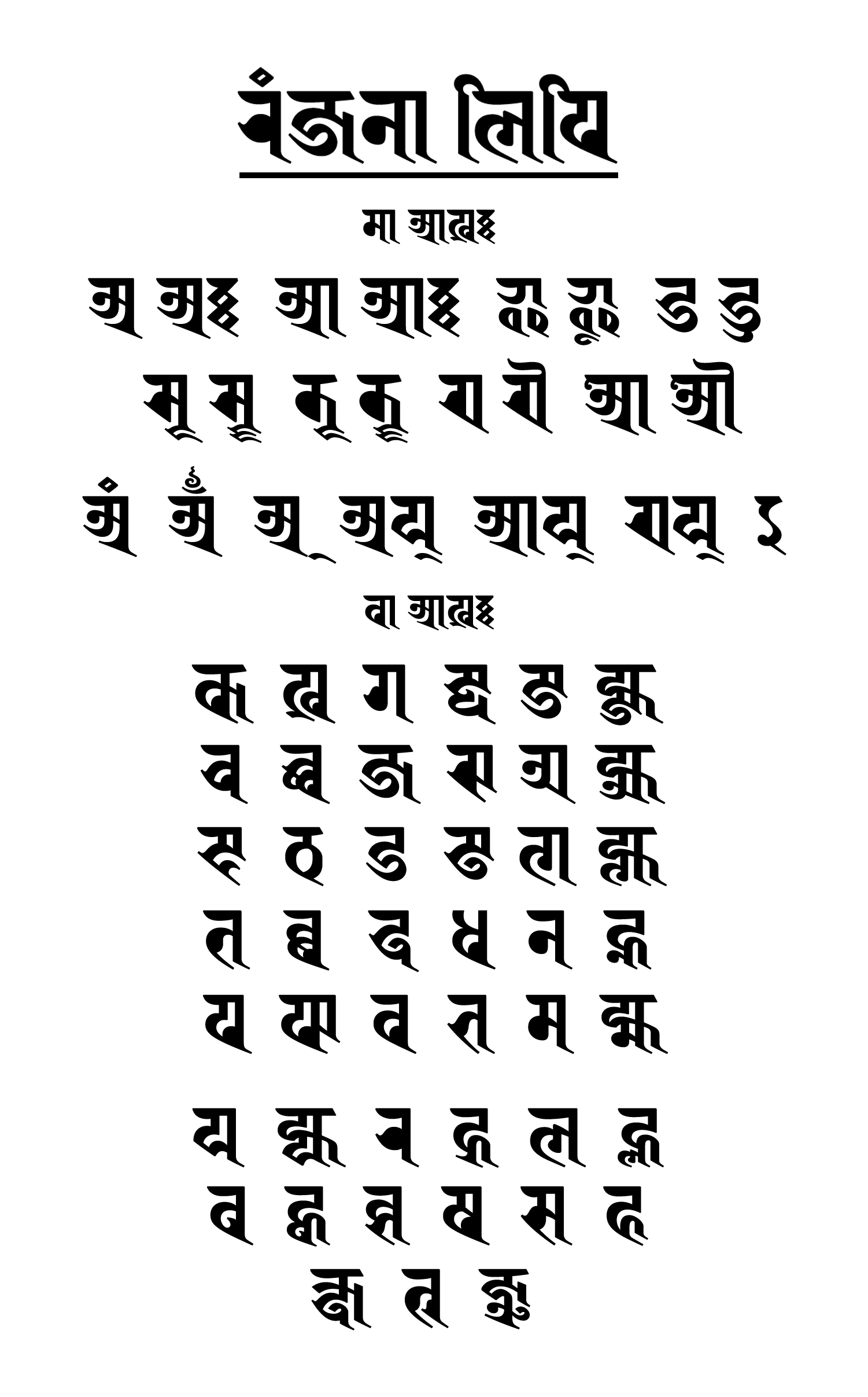
Ranjana Varnamala

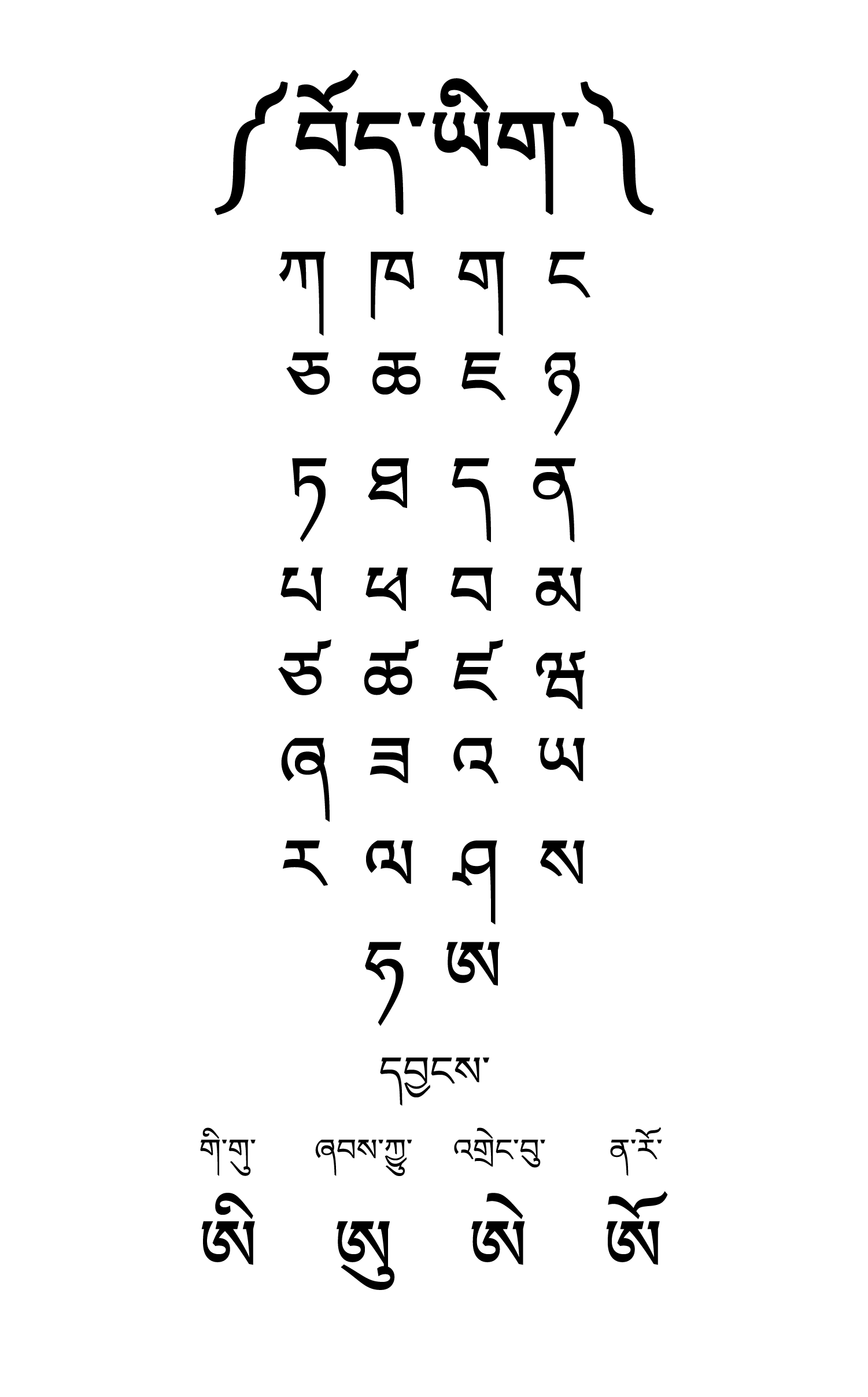
Tibetan Choksat (Varnamala) in Uchen style

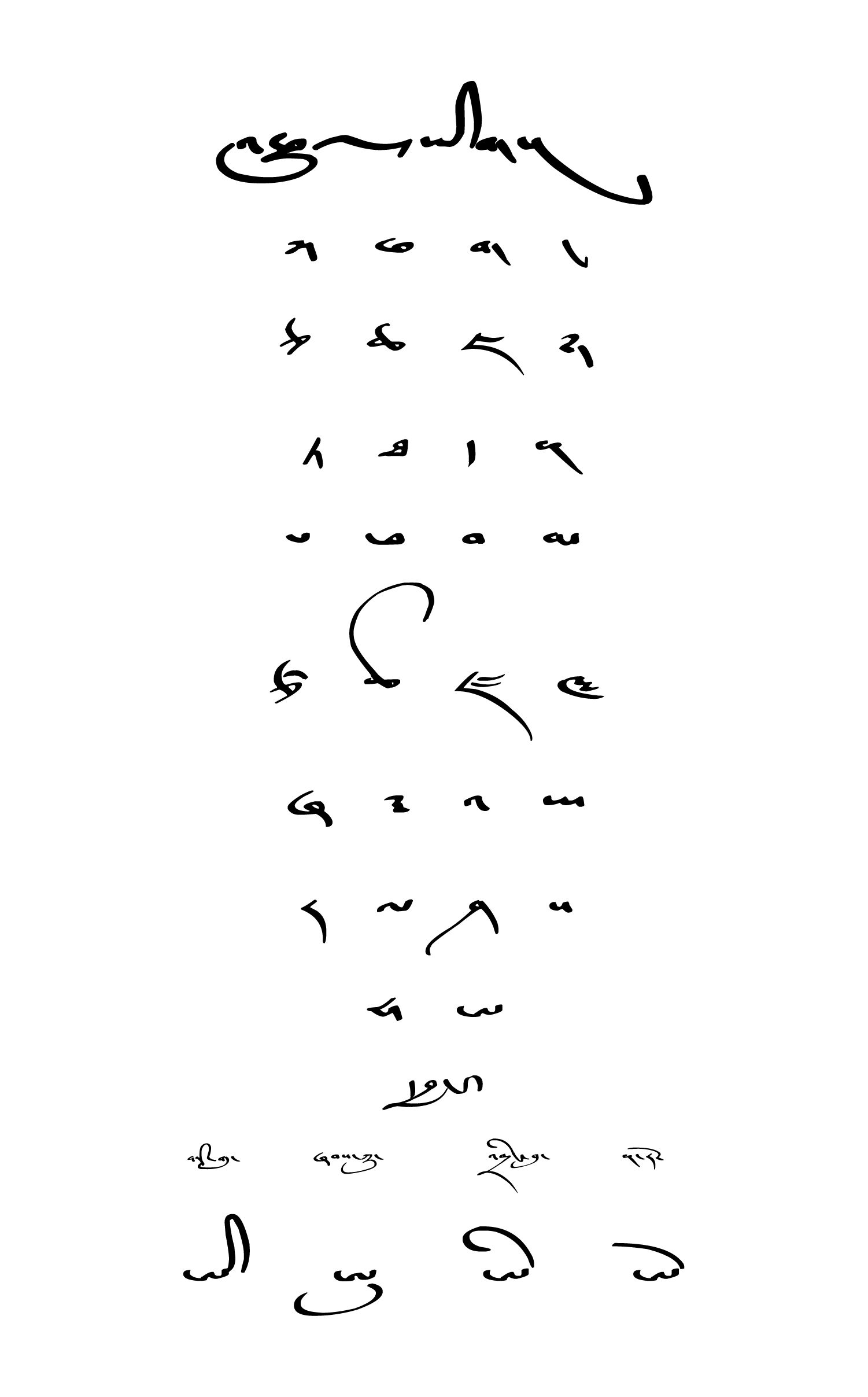
Tibetan Choksat (Varnamala) in Chugyig cursive style

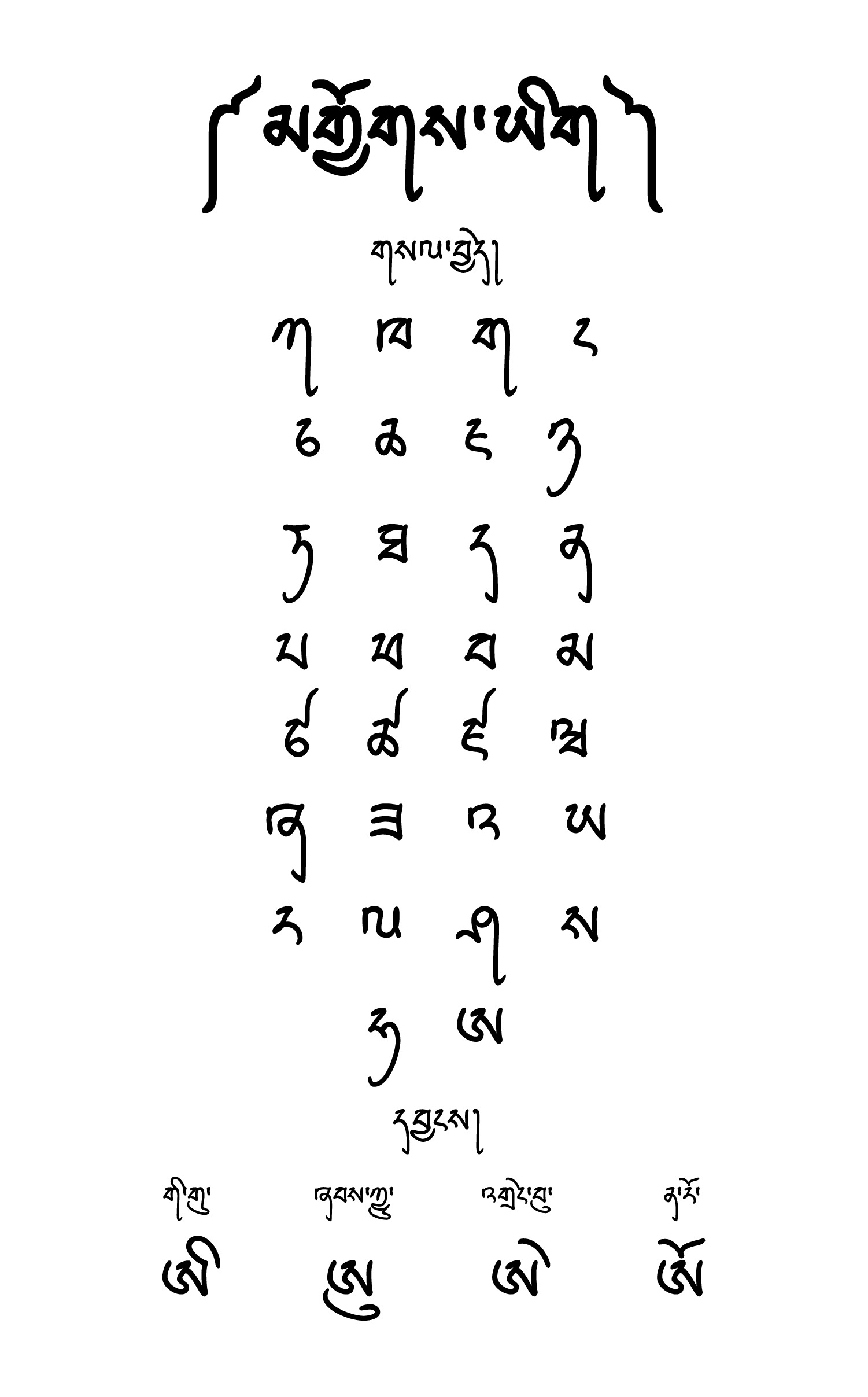
Jyoyig Choksat (Varnamala) ( a cursive style of Tibetan used for the Bhutanese language)

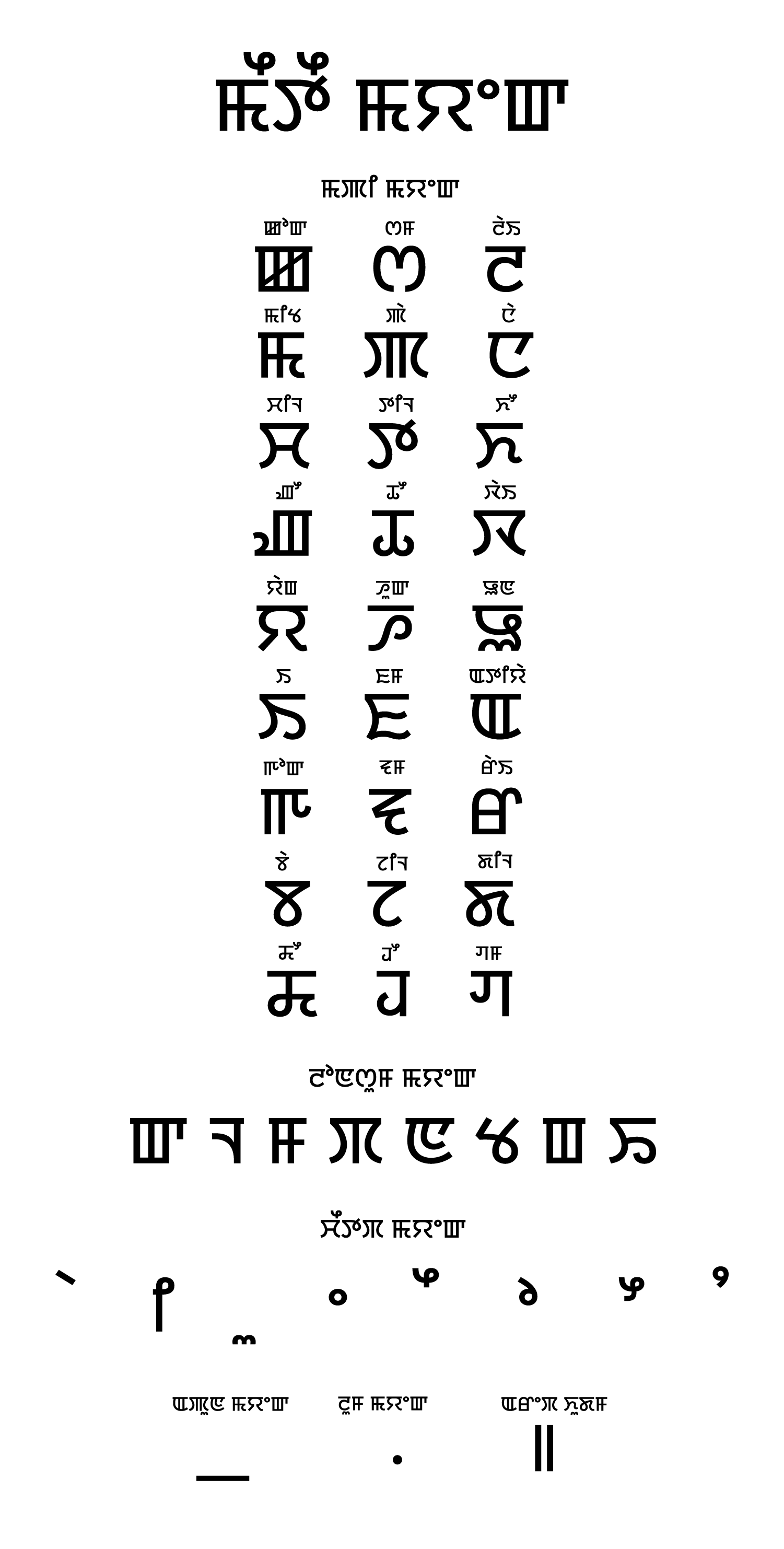
Meitei Mayek (Varnamala)

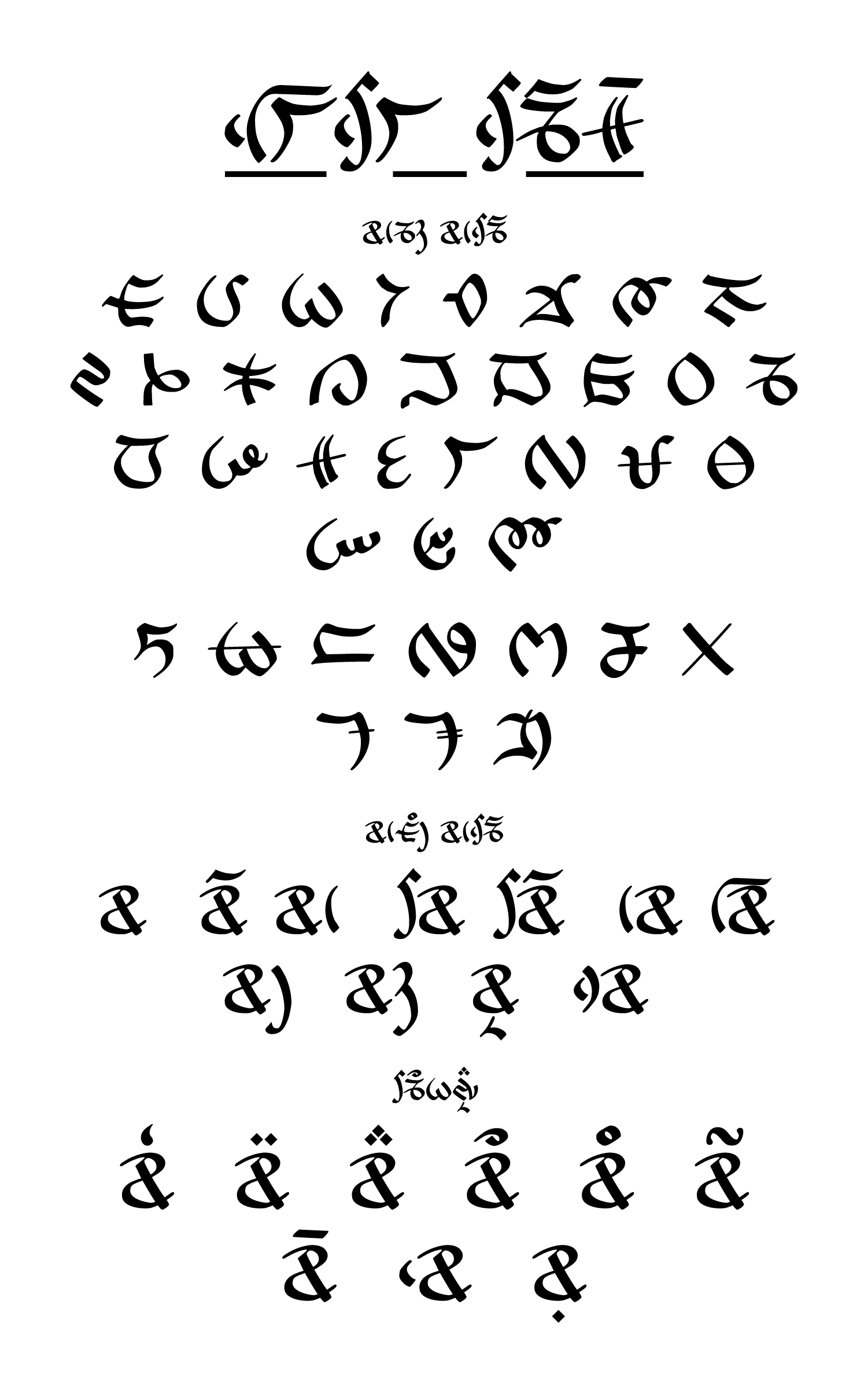
Lepcha Mingzat (Varnamala)

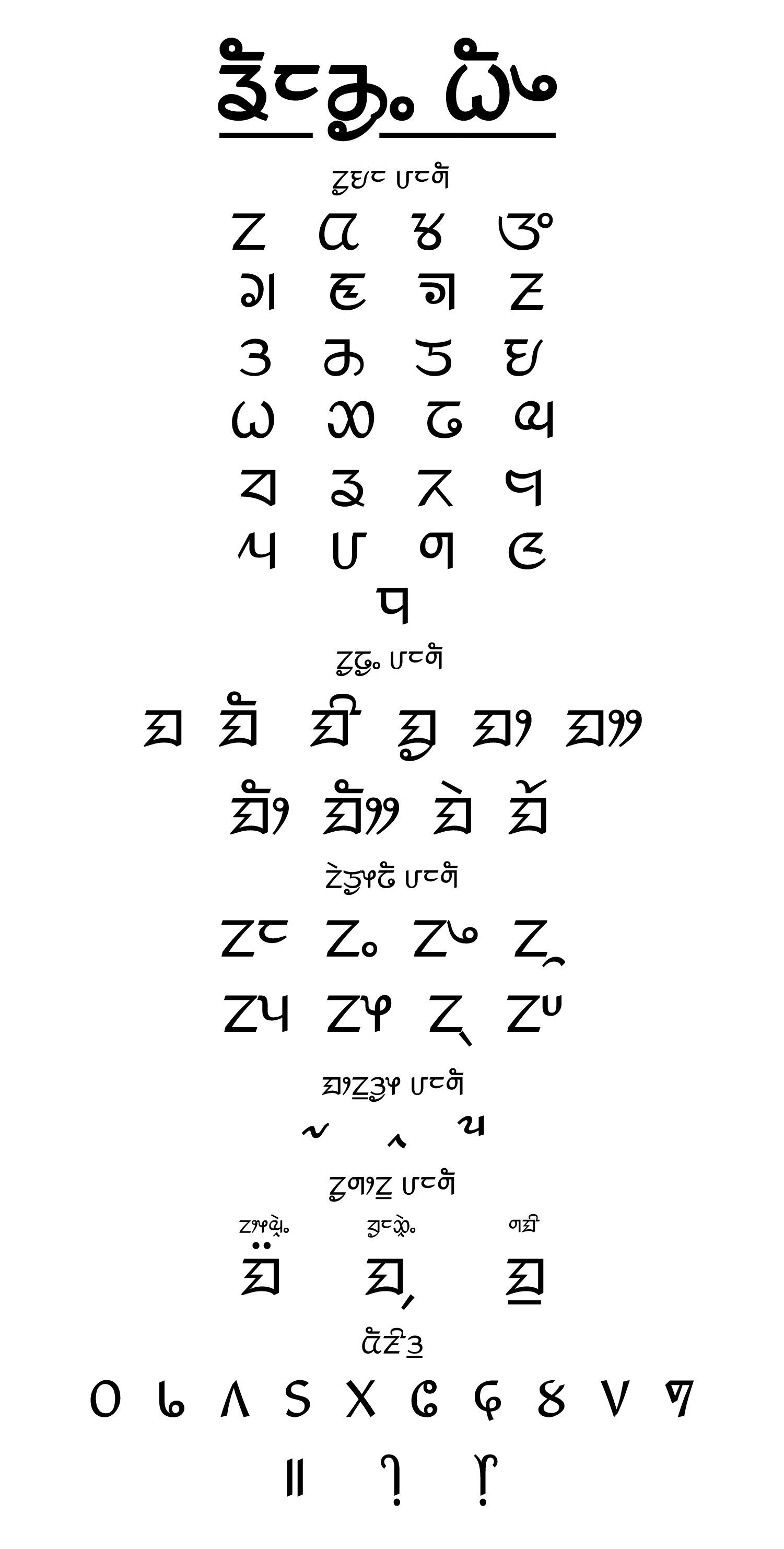
Limbu Alphabet (ᤕᤠᤰᤌᤢᤱ ᤐᤠᤴ)

=== Southern Brahmi ===
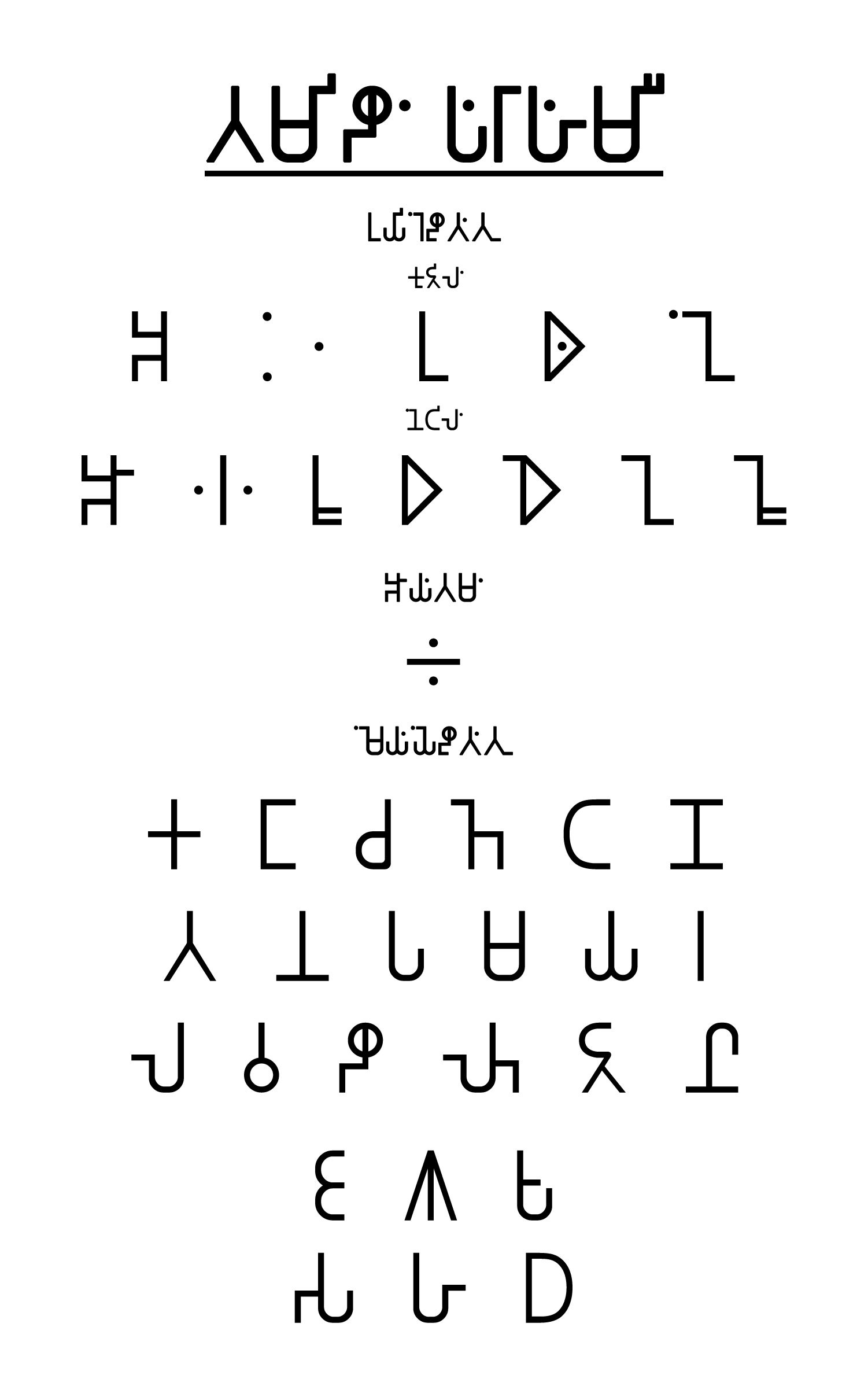
Late stage Tamil Brahmi ariccuvaṭi (in modern typeface) from 3^{rd} c.e B.C.E. - 1^{st} c.e.

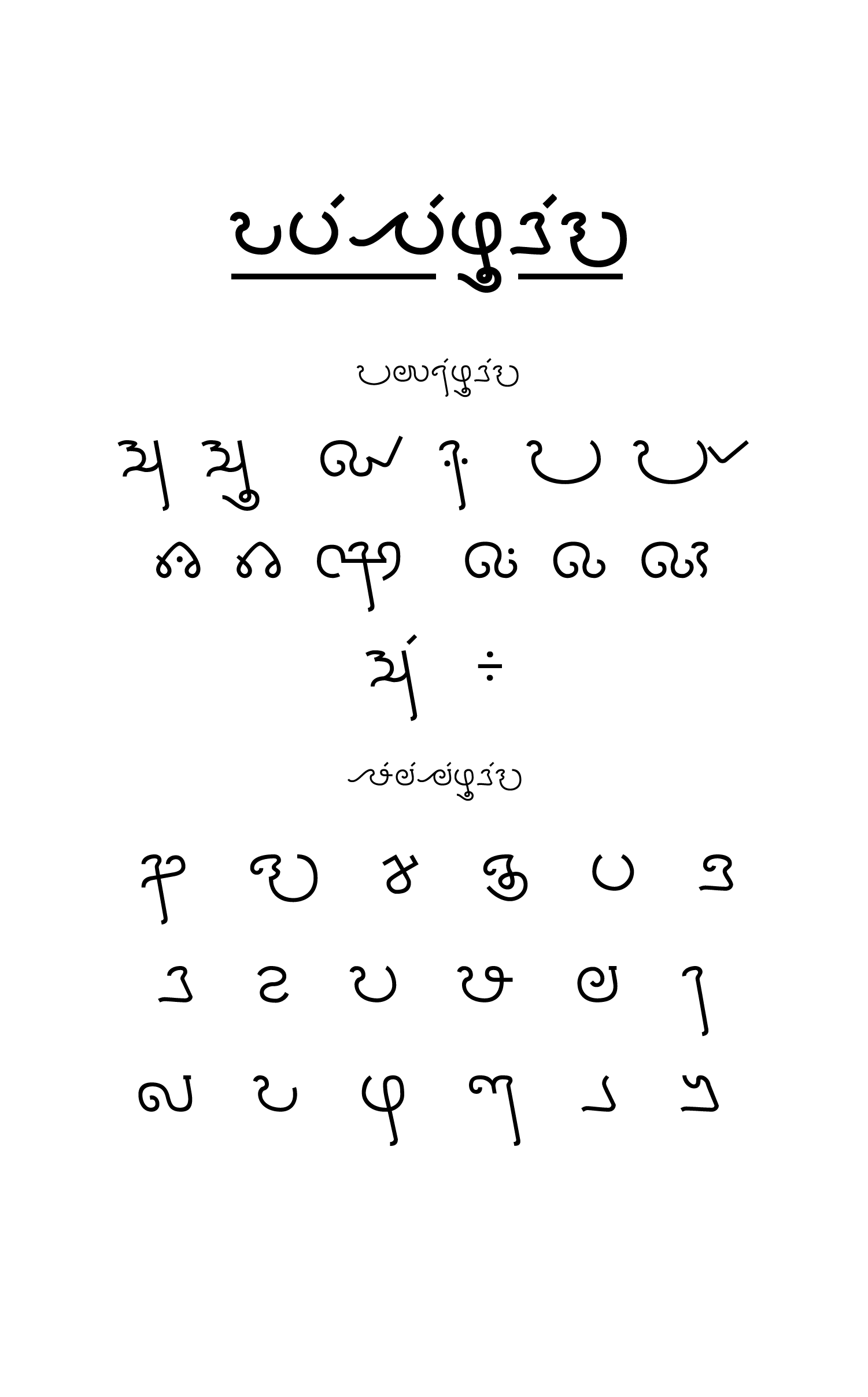
Late stage Vatteluttu Aksharamala (in modern typeface) from 7^{th} - 8^{th} c.e

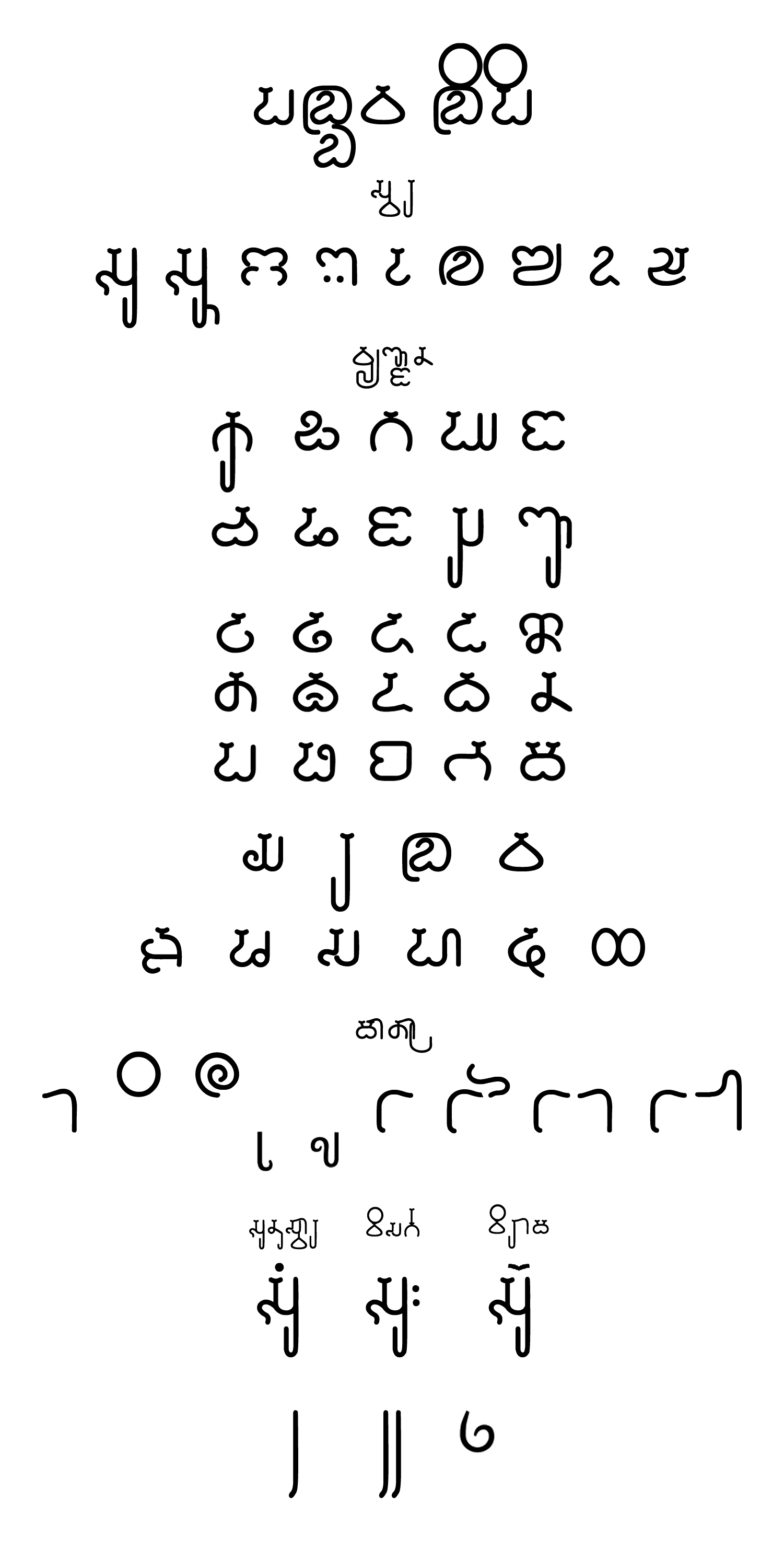
Pallava Aksharamala (in modern typeface) from 4^{th} - 7^{th} c.e used by the Pallava Dynasty

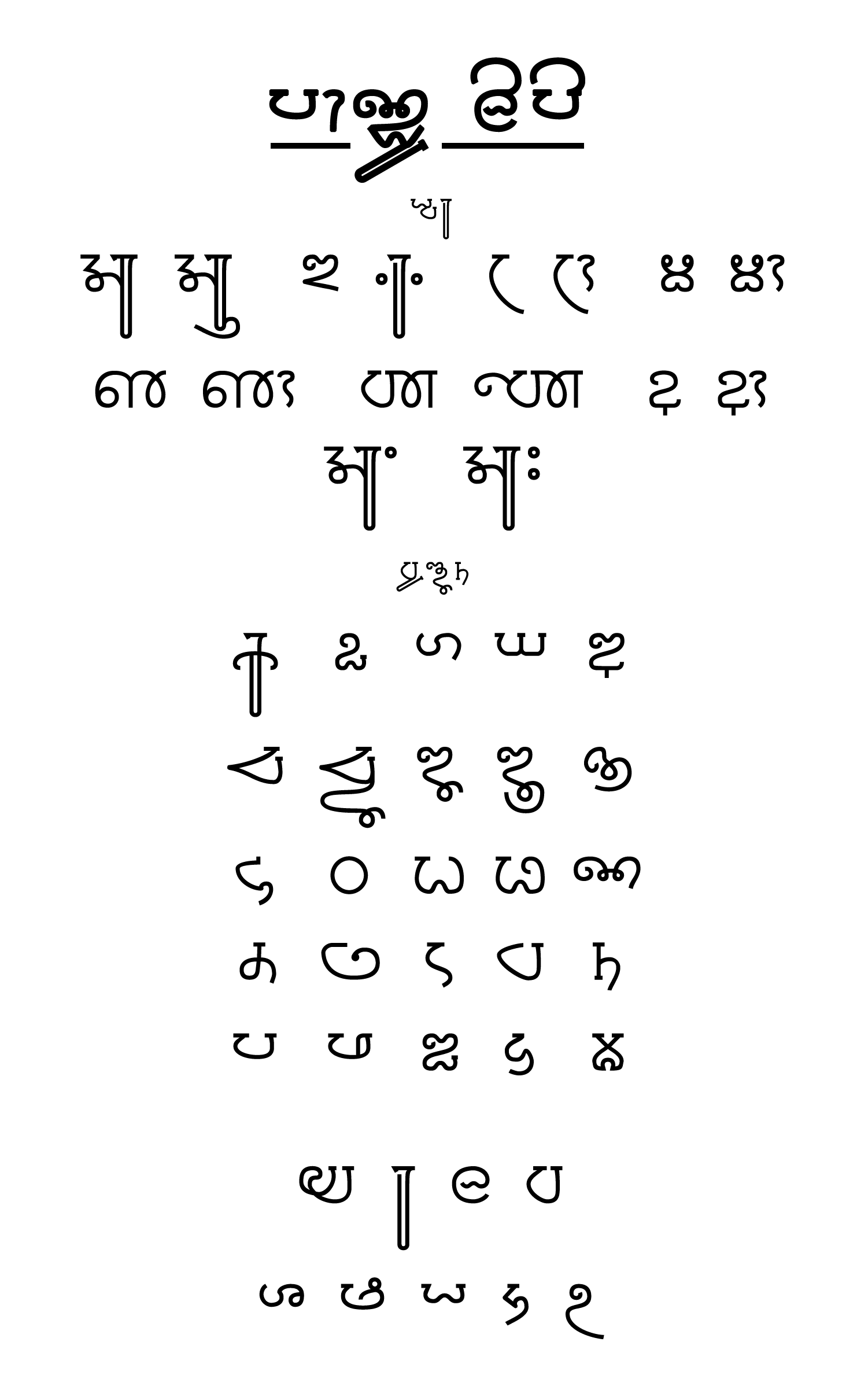
Pandya style Transitional-Grantha (in modern typeface) from the 8^{th} c.e Velvikudi inscription.

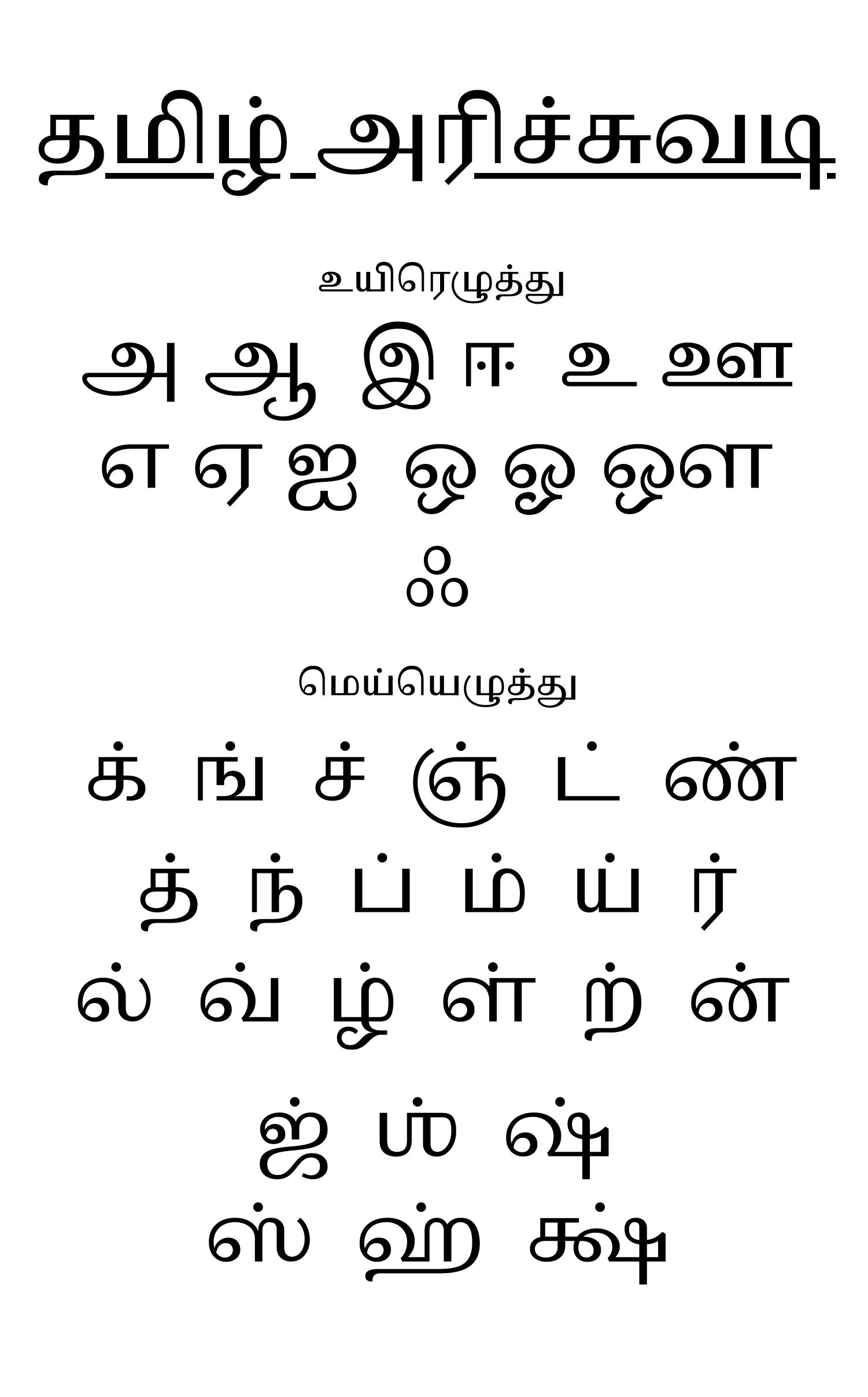
Modern Tamil Ariccuvaṭi

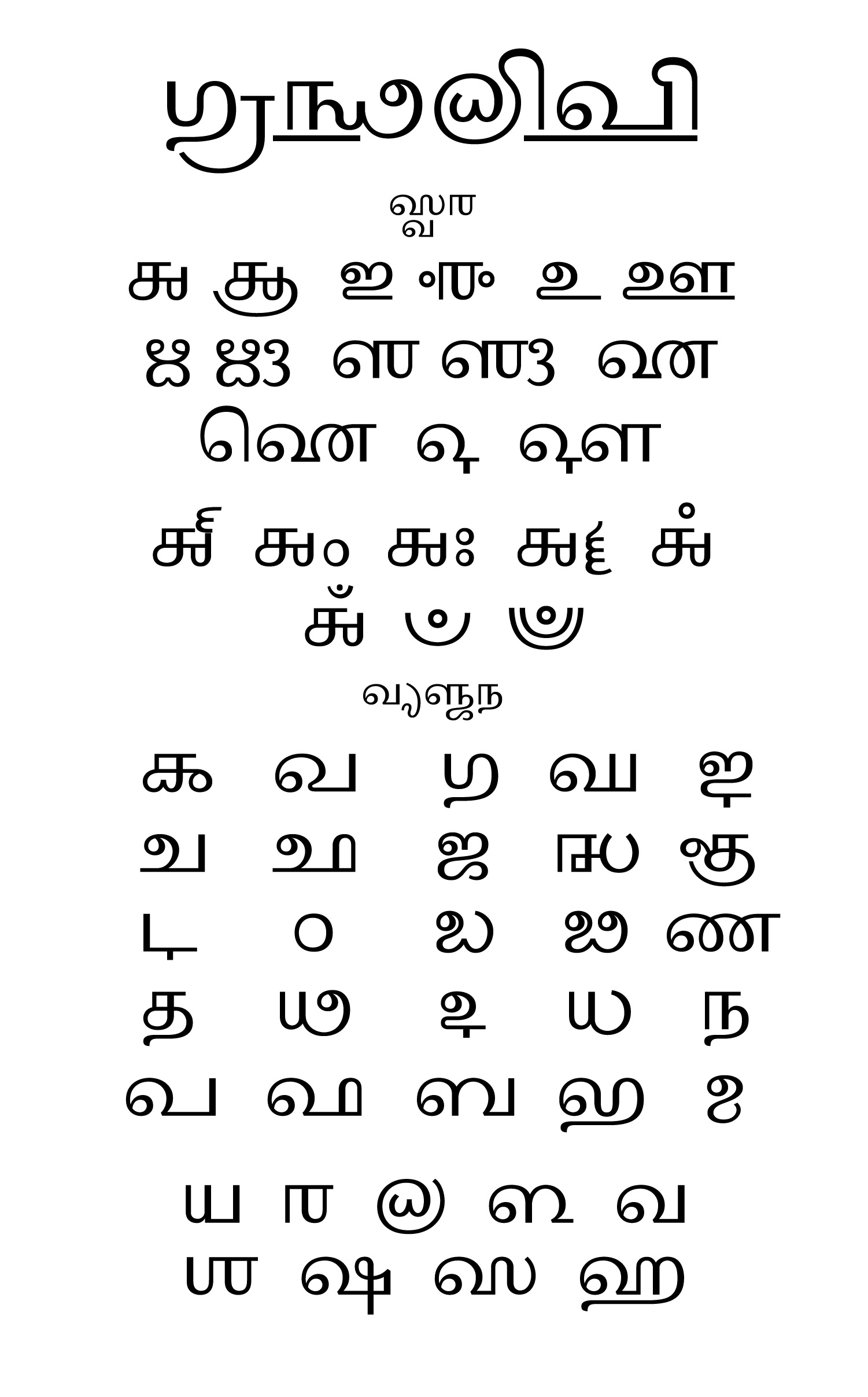
Modern Grantha Aksharamala

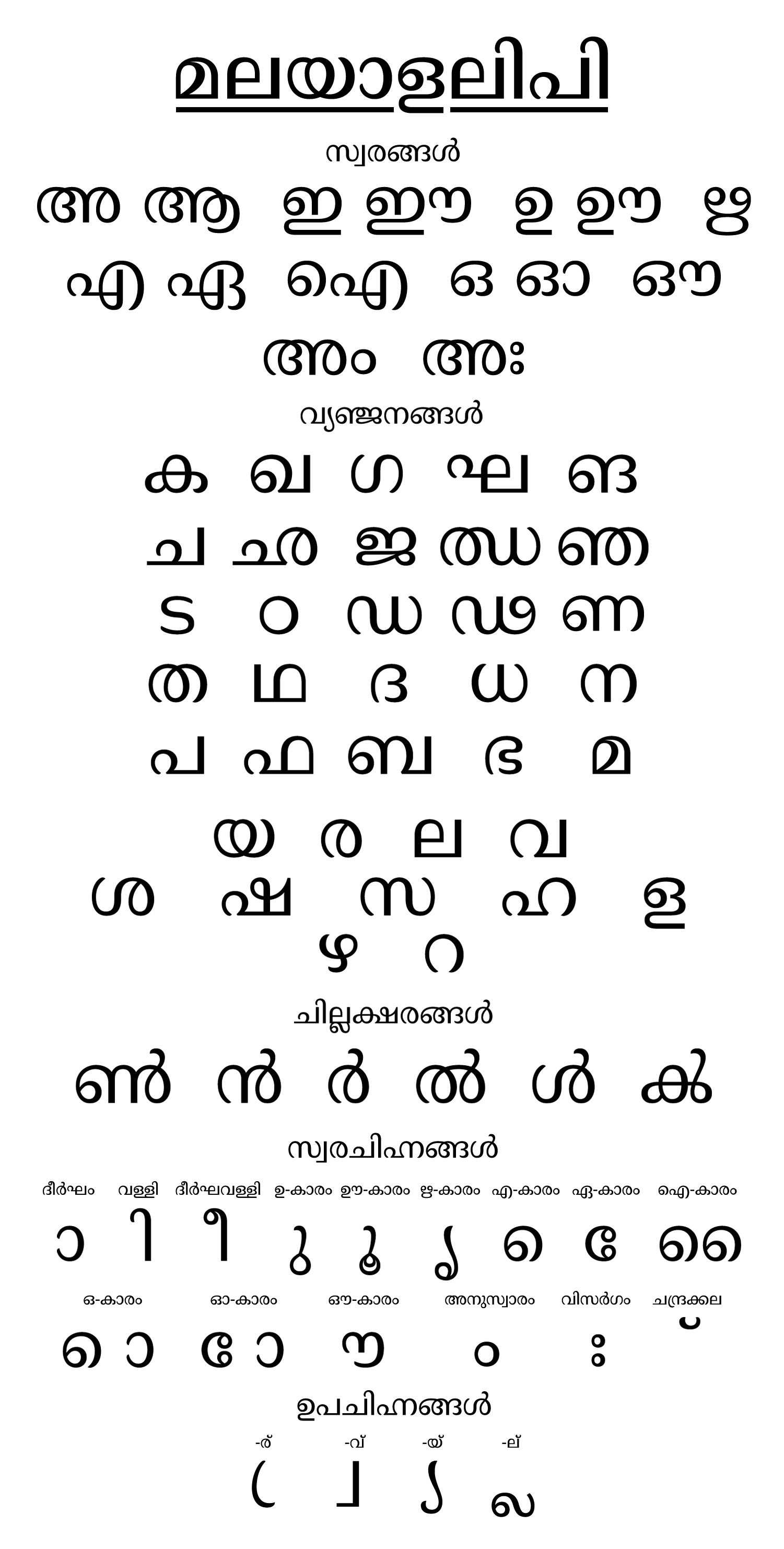
Modern Malayalam Aksharamala

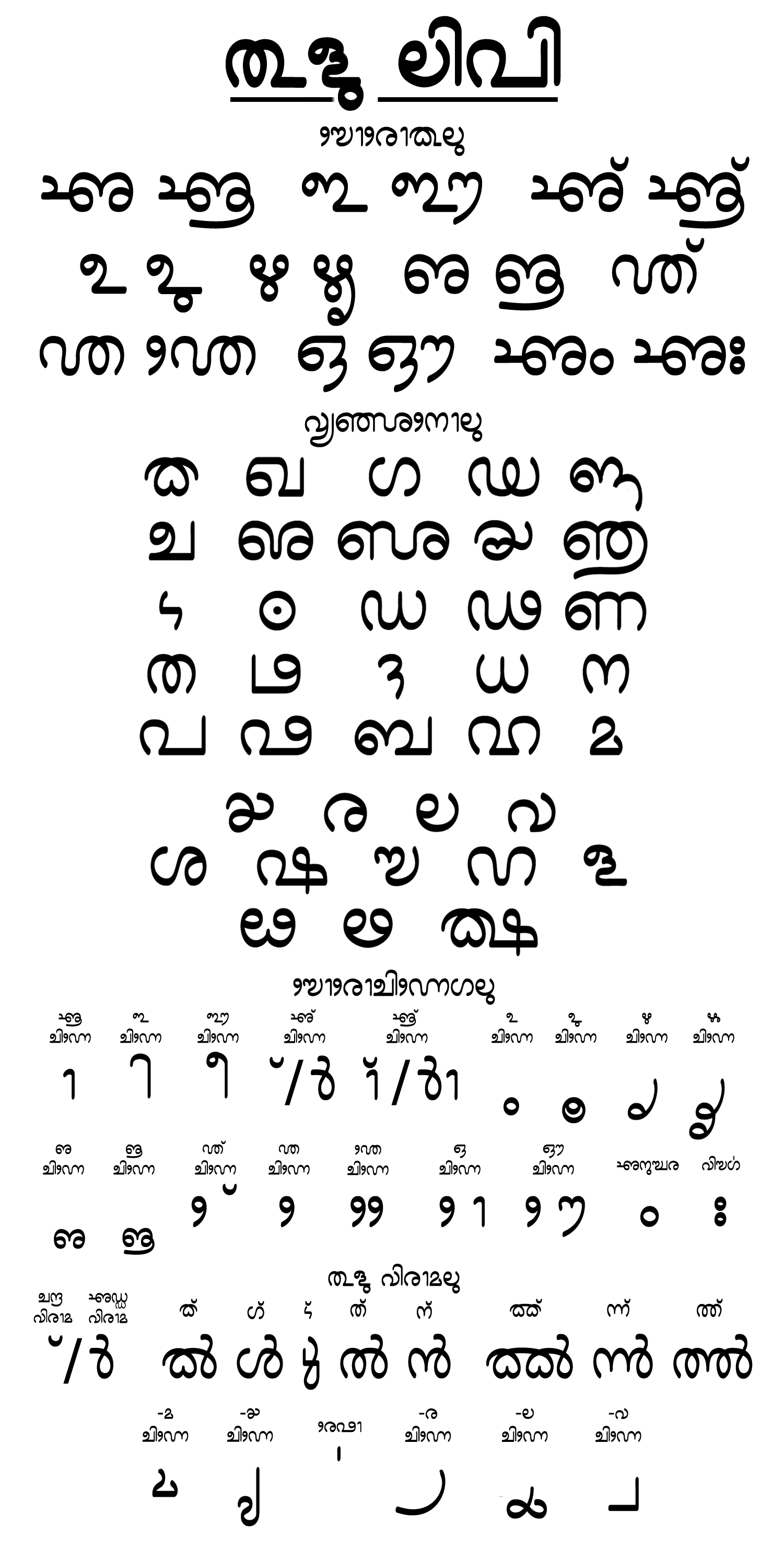
Tulu Aksharamale

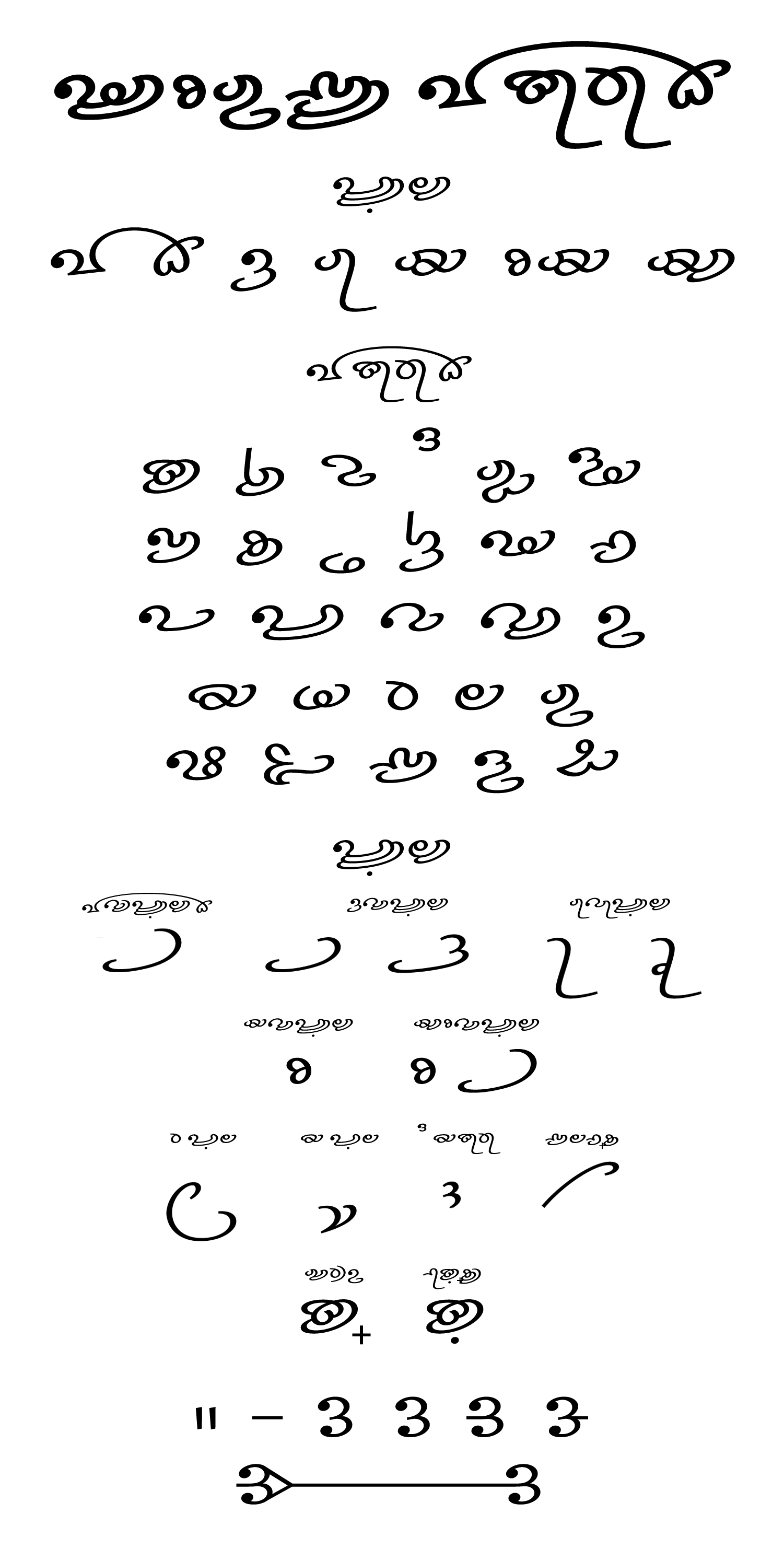
Dives Akuru Chart from 16^{th} -18^{th} c.e.

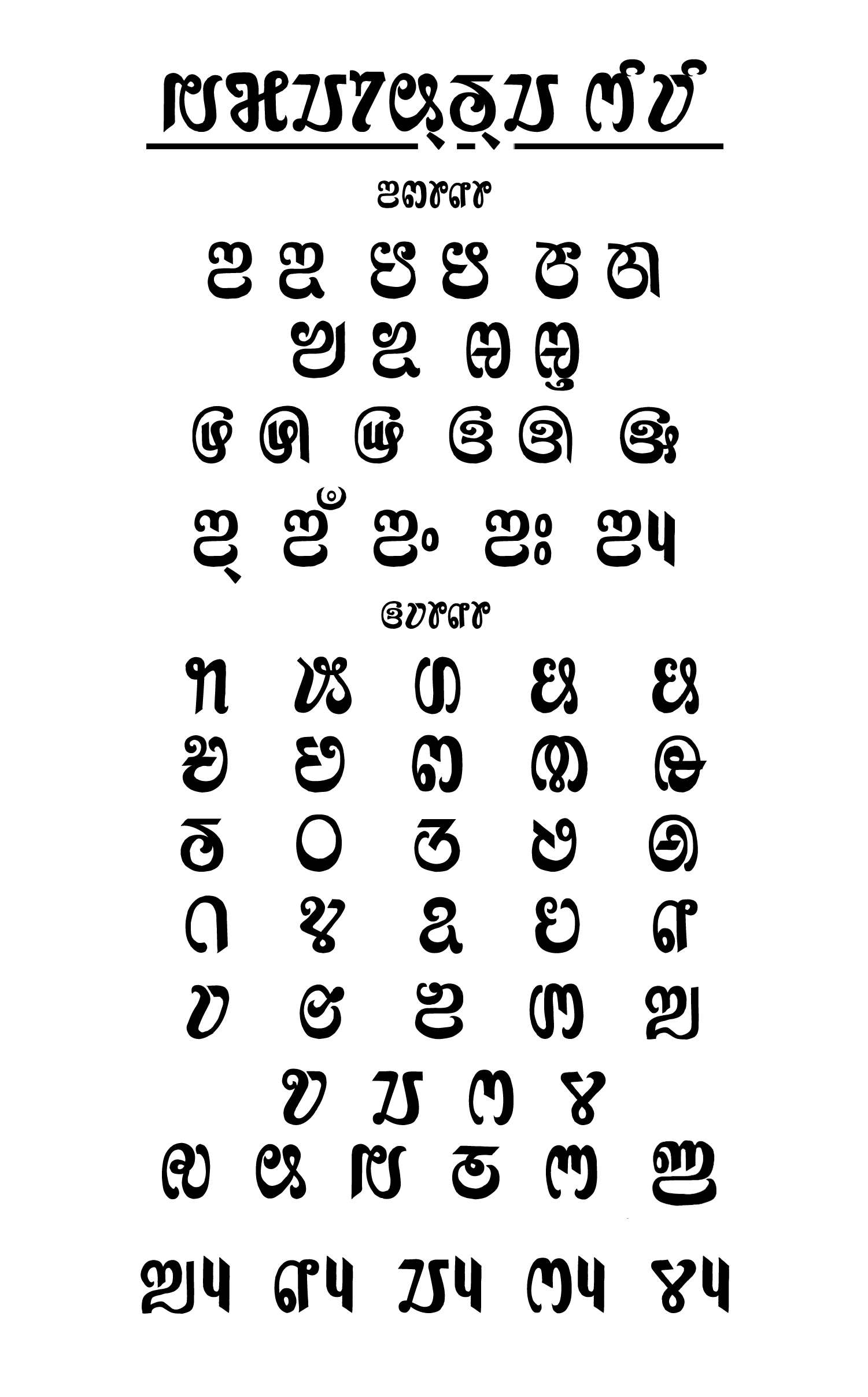
Modern Saurashtra Aksharamala

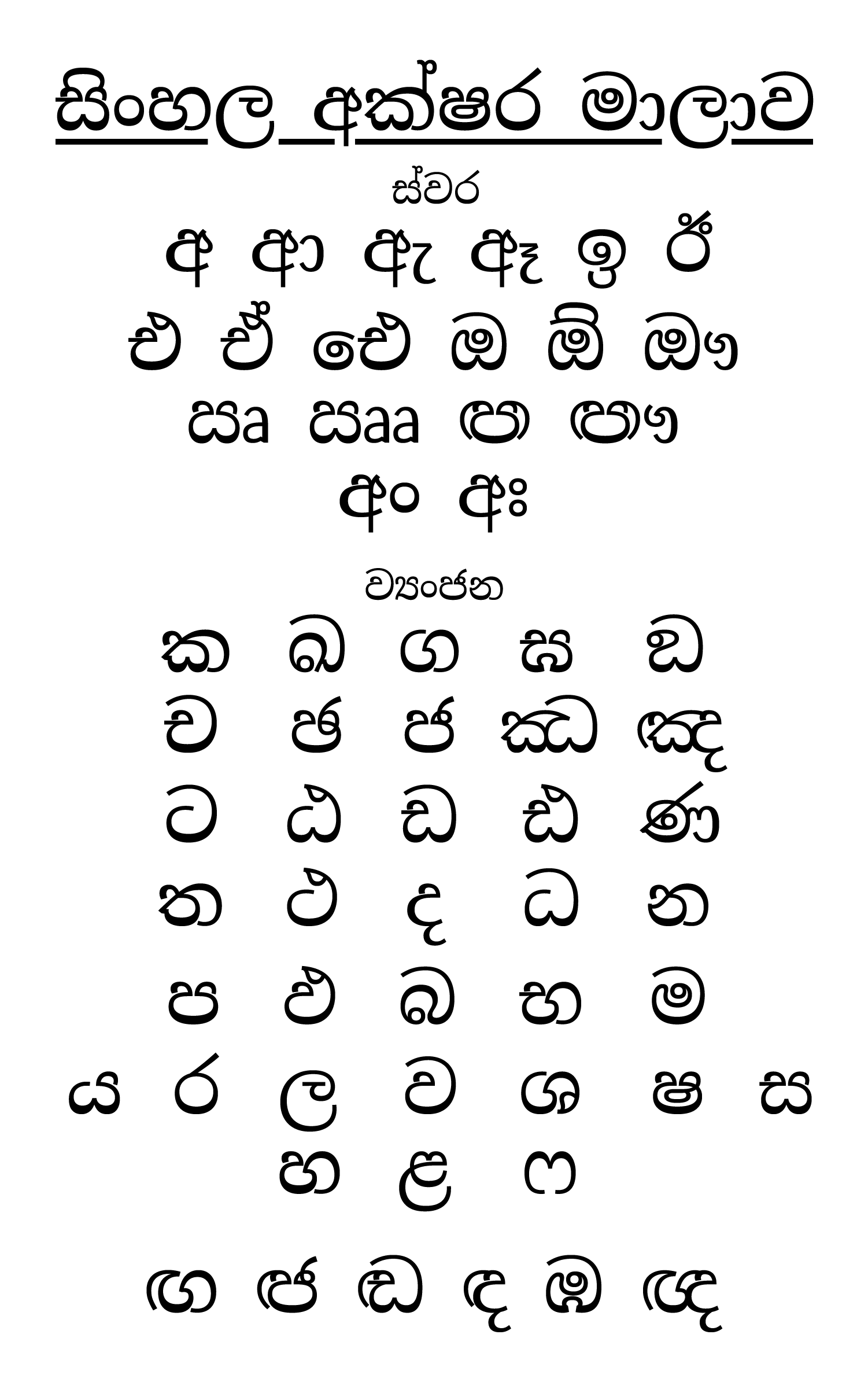
Modern Sinhala Akshara Malawa

Box-Headed script (Central variety in modern typeface) from 6^{th} - 7^{th} c.e used in Dakshina Kosala

Hoysala script (in modern typeface) used from 11^{th} - 13^{th} c.e by the Hoysala Kingdom

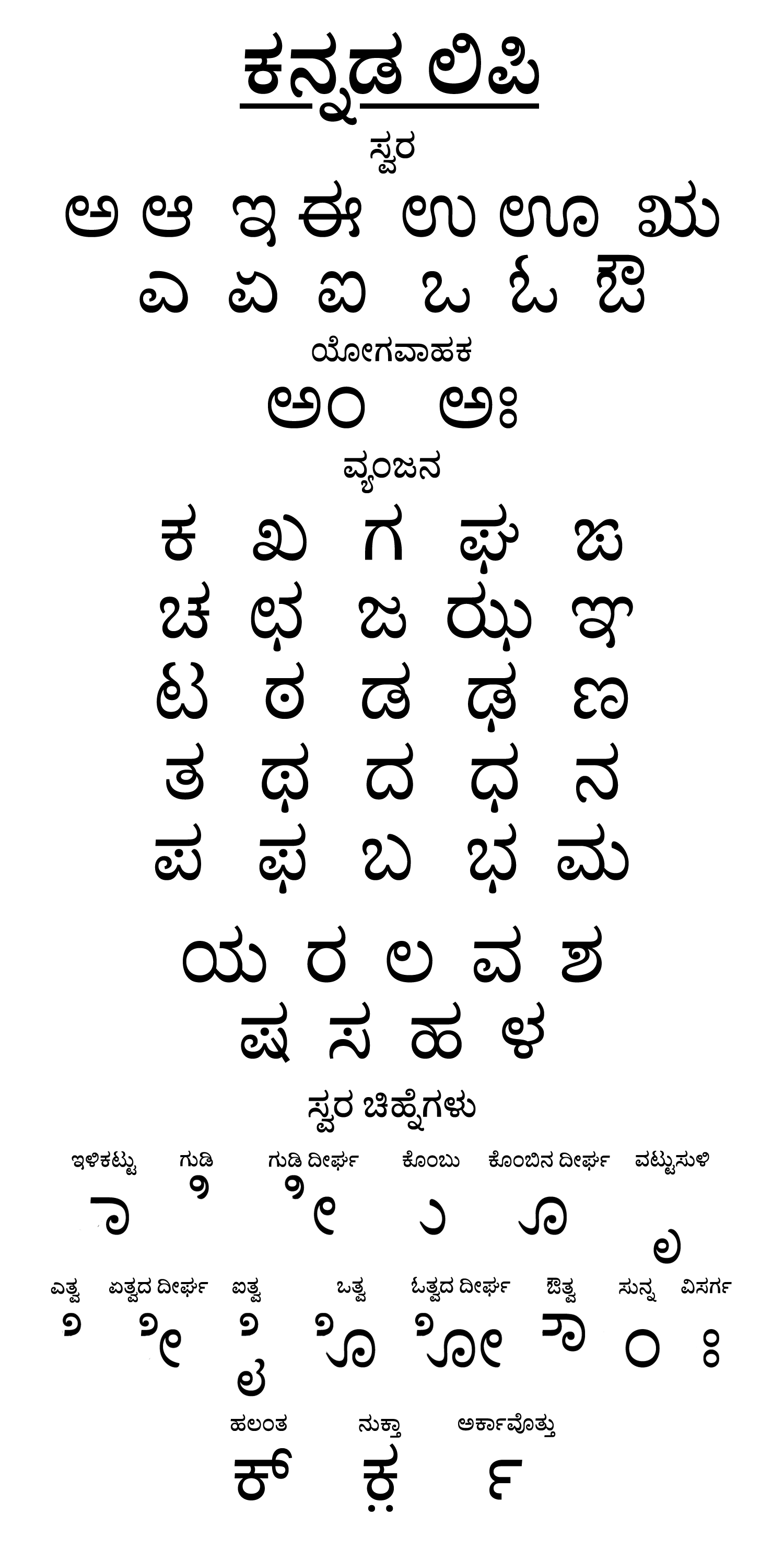
Modern Kannada Aksharamala

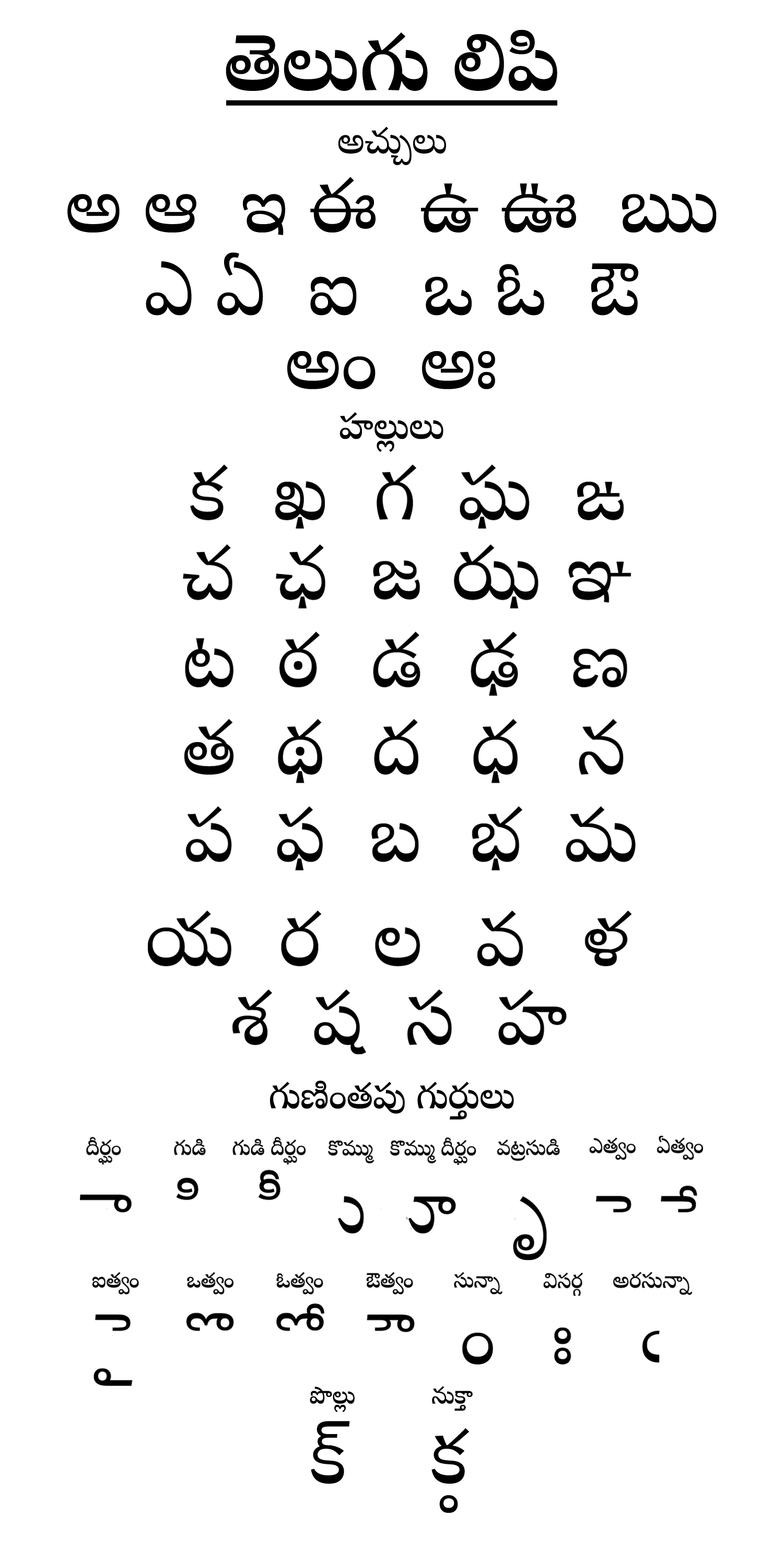
Modern Telugu Aksharamala

=== Brahmic-derived scripts and constructed neographies ===
Bharati lipi, a proposed unified script for all Indian languages.

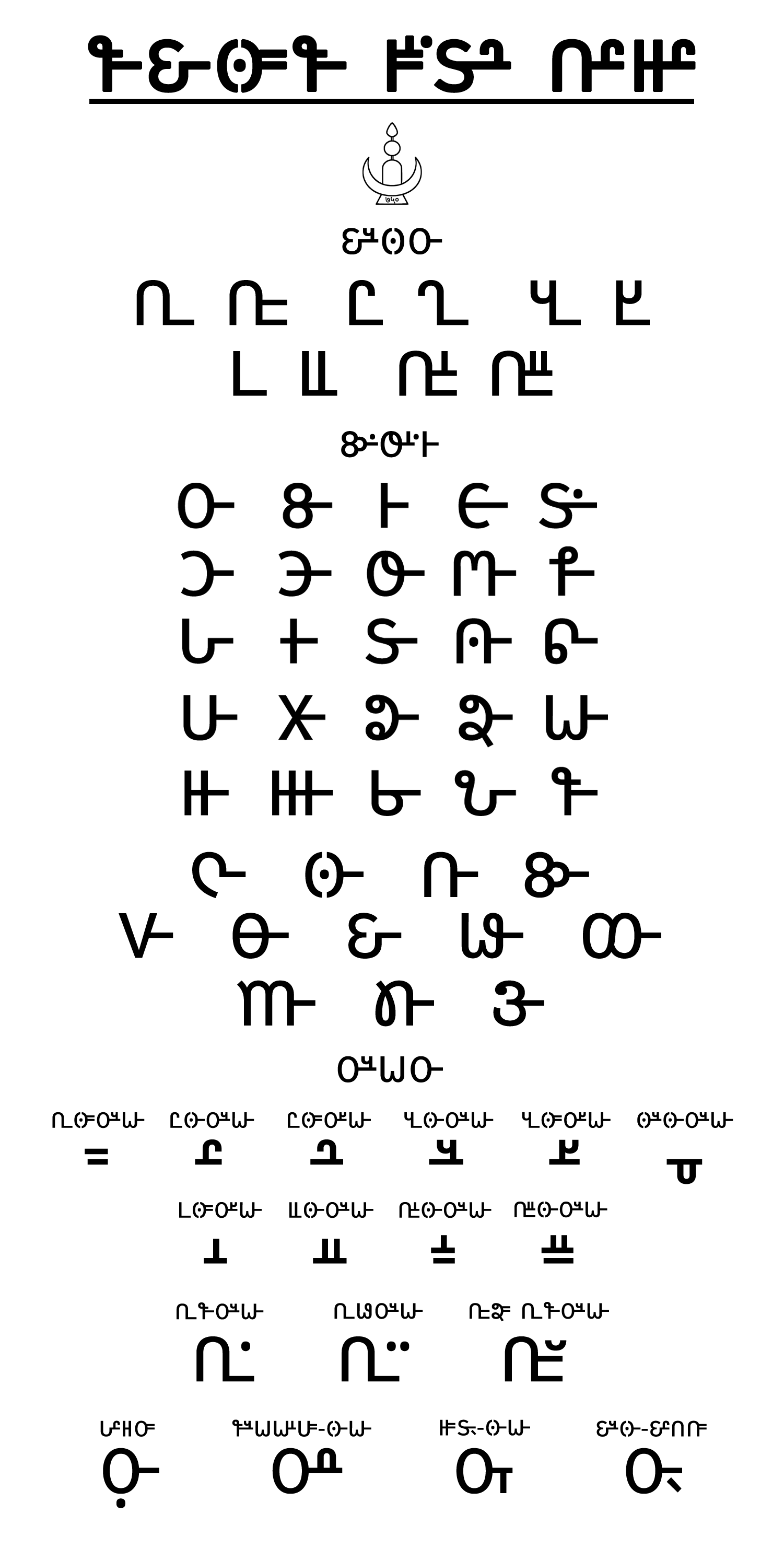
Masaram Gondi Aksharamala (Constructed script used for Gondi)

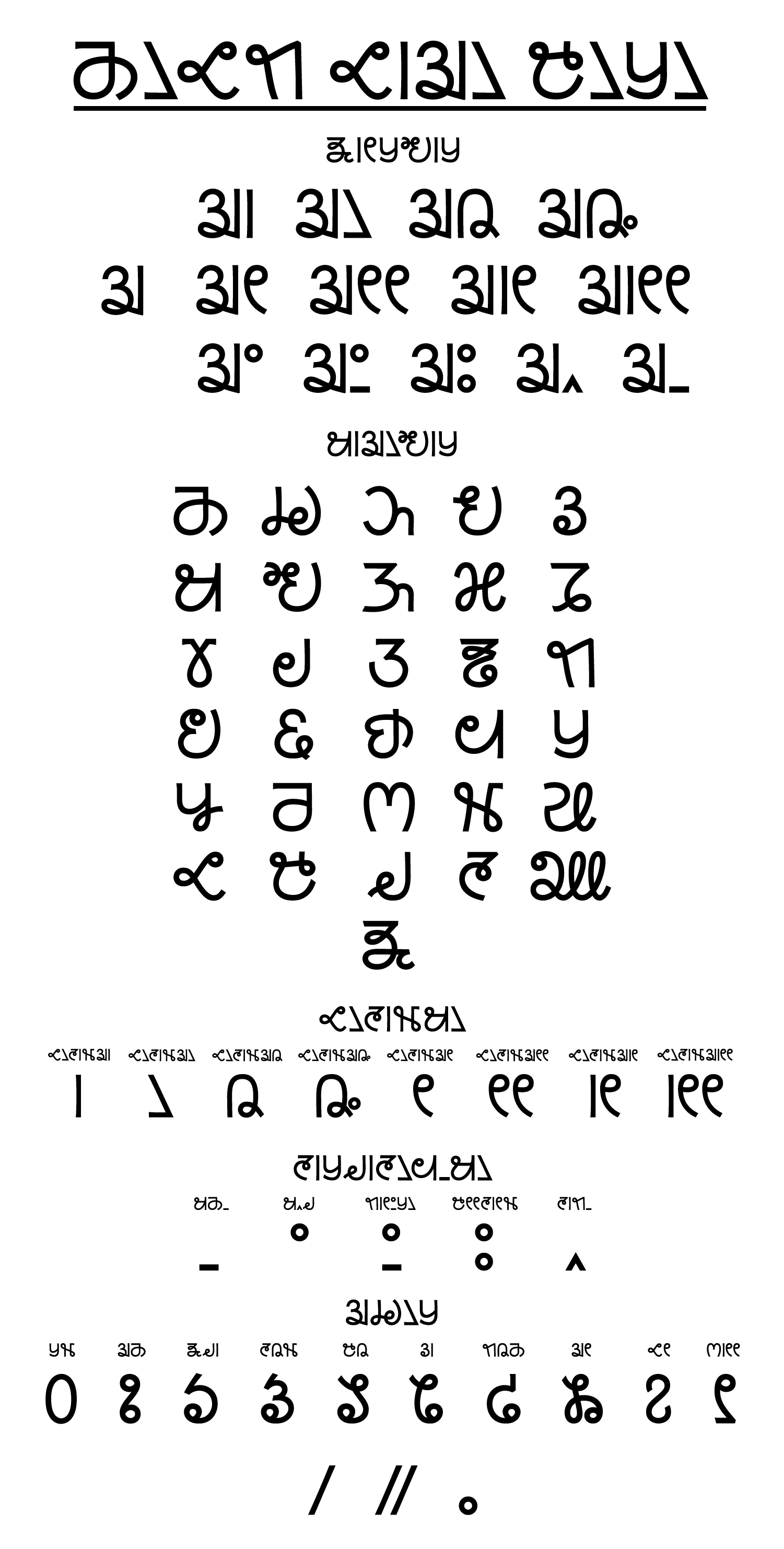
Kirat Rai Akshara (Constructed script used for Bantawa)

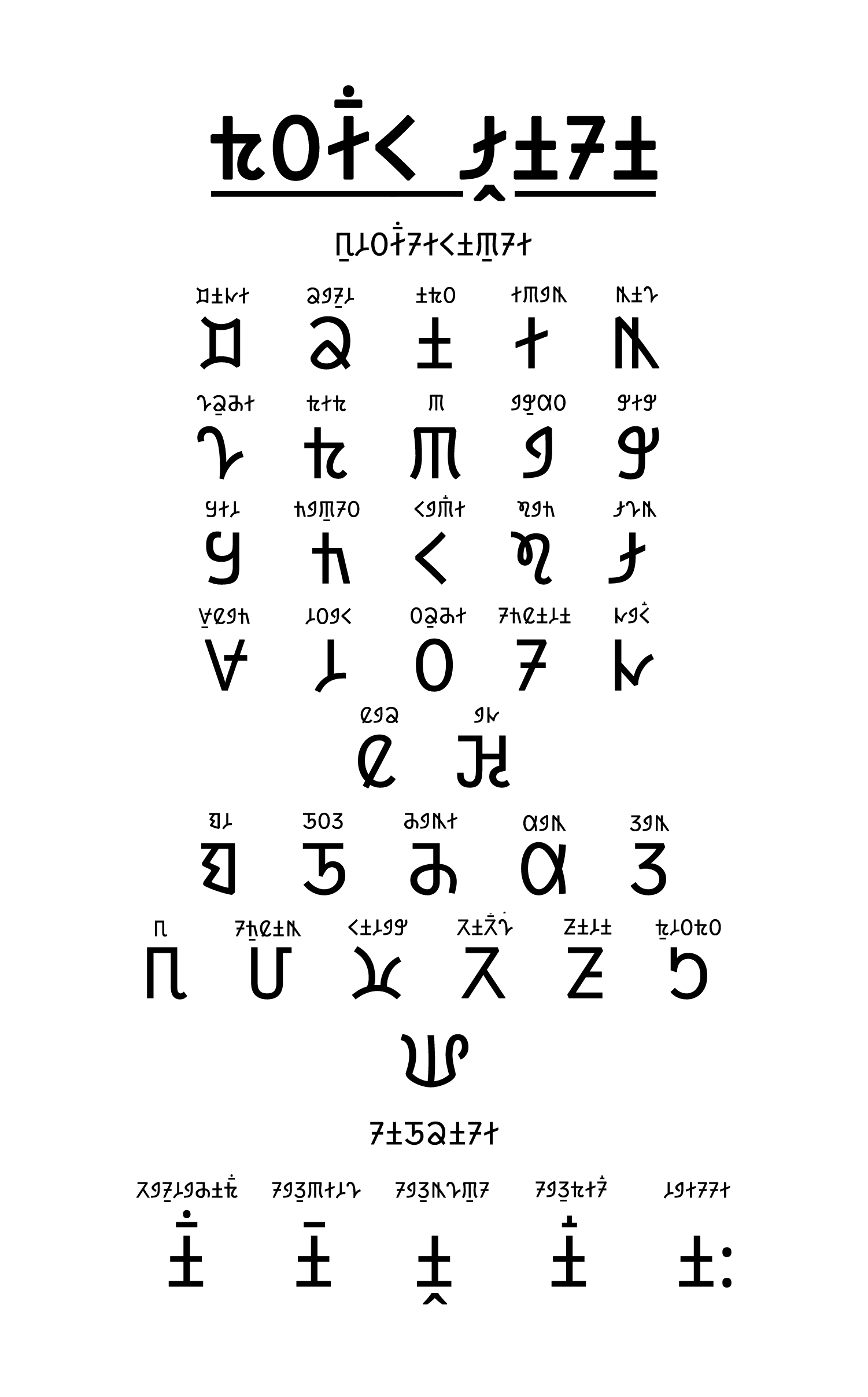
Sunuwar Varnamala used for Sunwar language in Sikkim. (Functions as a Brahmic abugida with diacritics & different letters from the alphabetic Nepal variant)

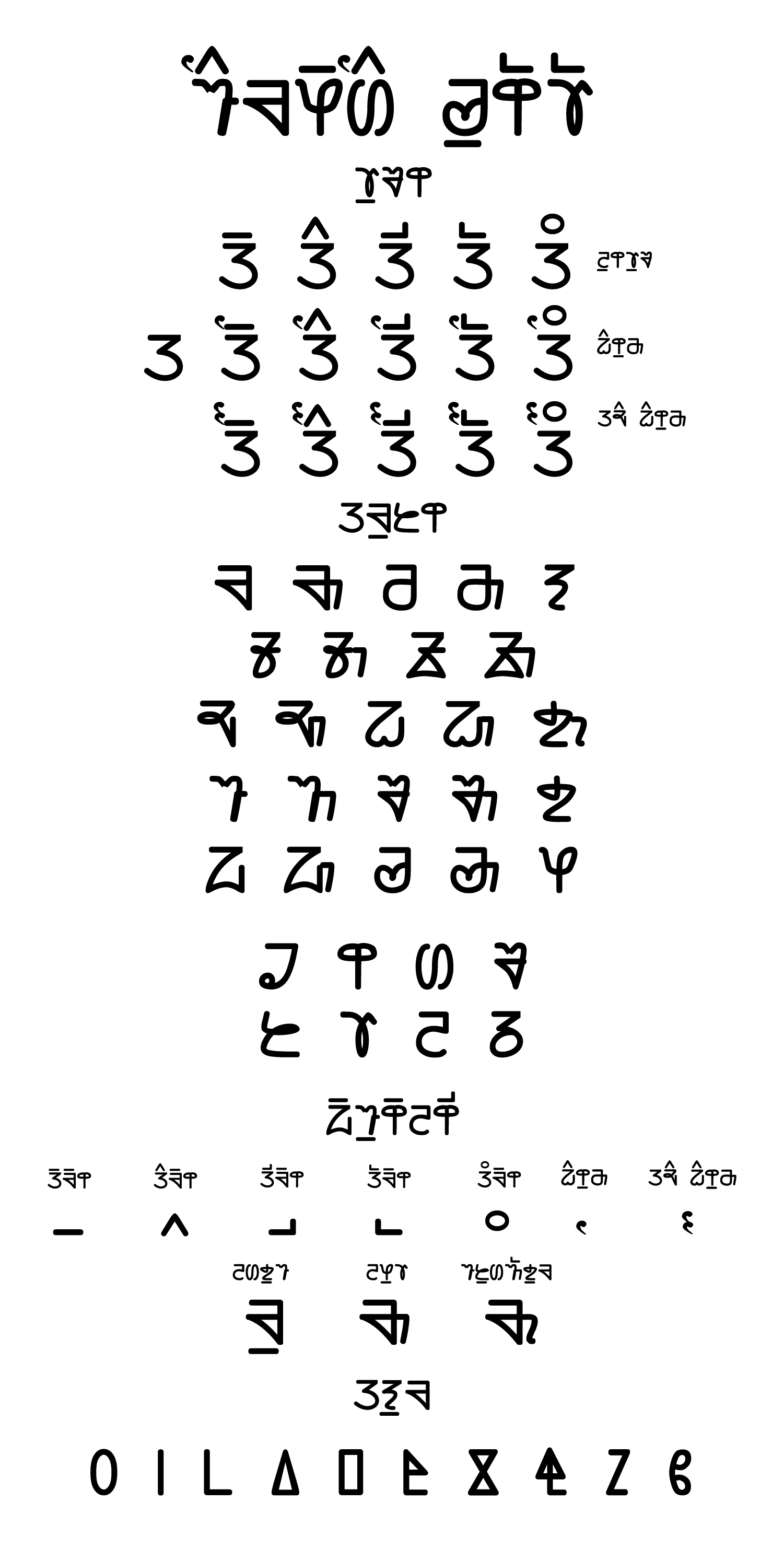
Tikamuli Brese (Constructed script used for Sunwar in Nepal)

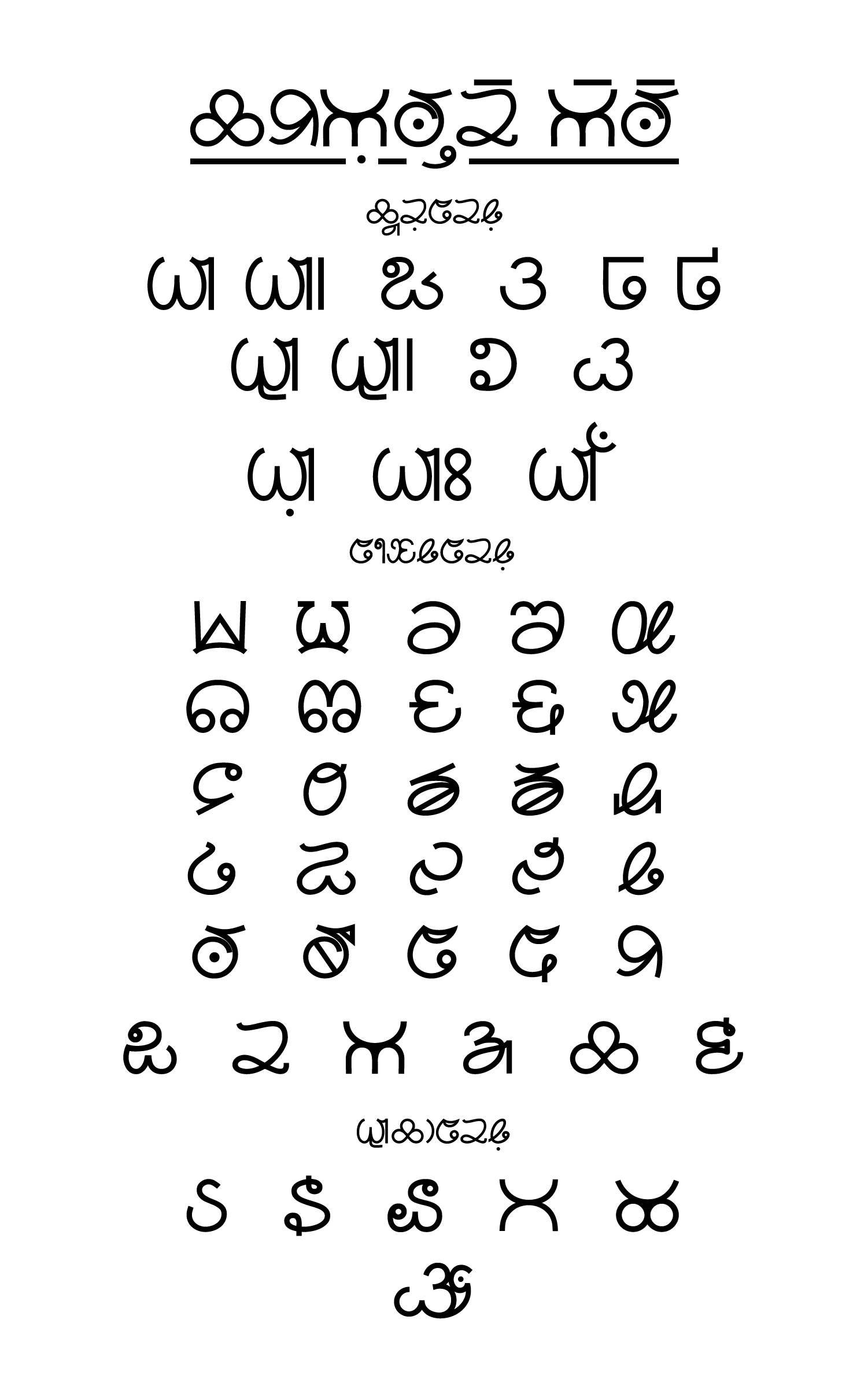
Sambalpuri Akshara (Constructed script used for Sambalpuri)

Kui Gaari (Constructed script used for Kui)

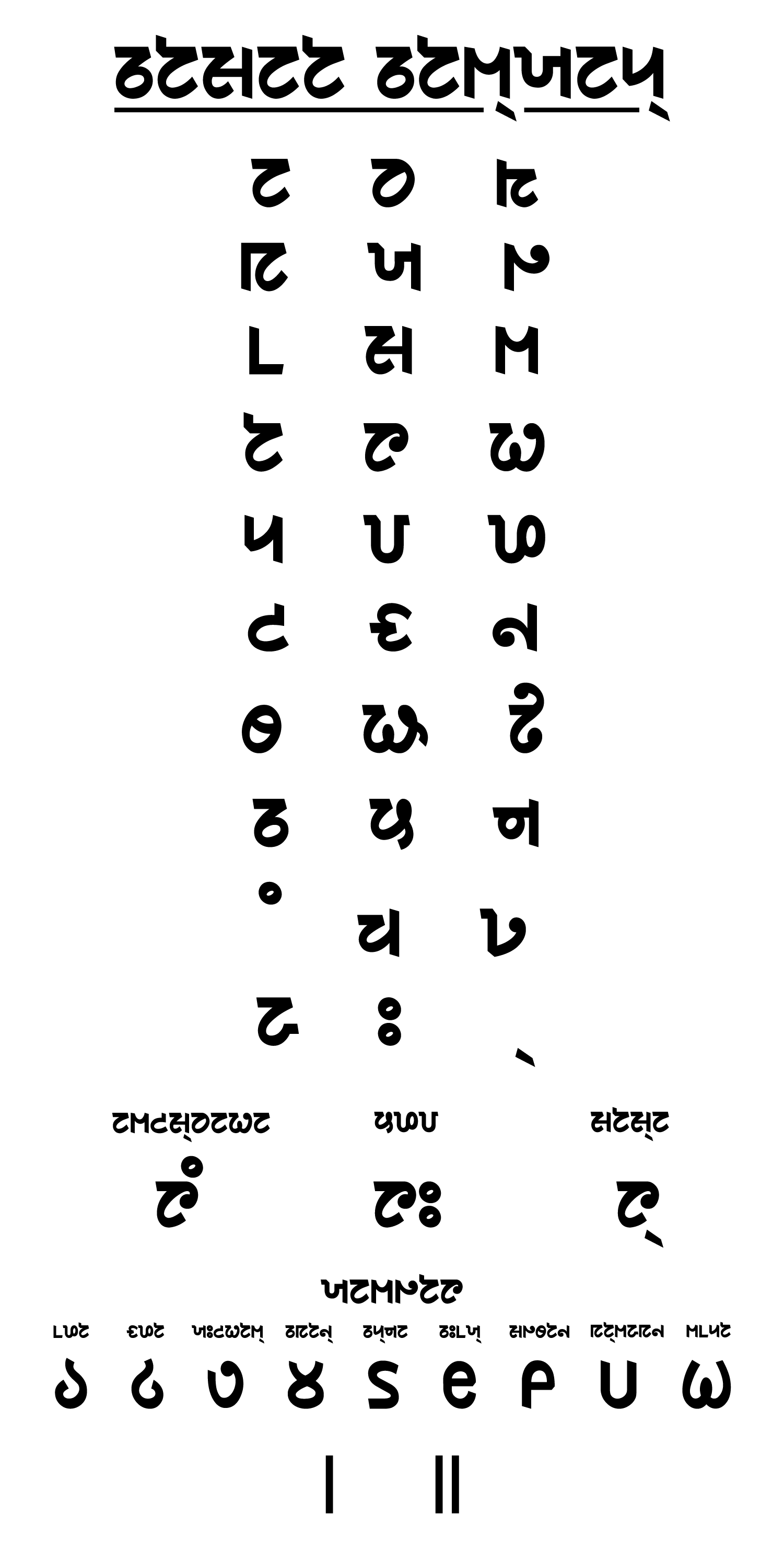
Chisoi Lipi used for the Kurmali language (an alphabetic script with an inherent vowel like brahmic scripts)

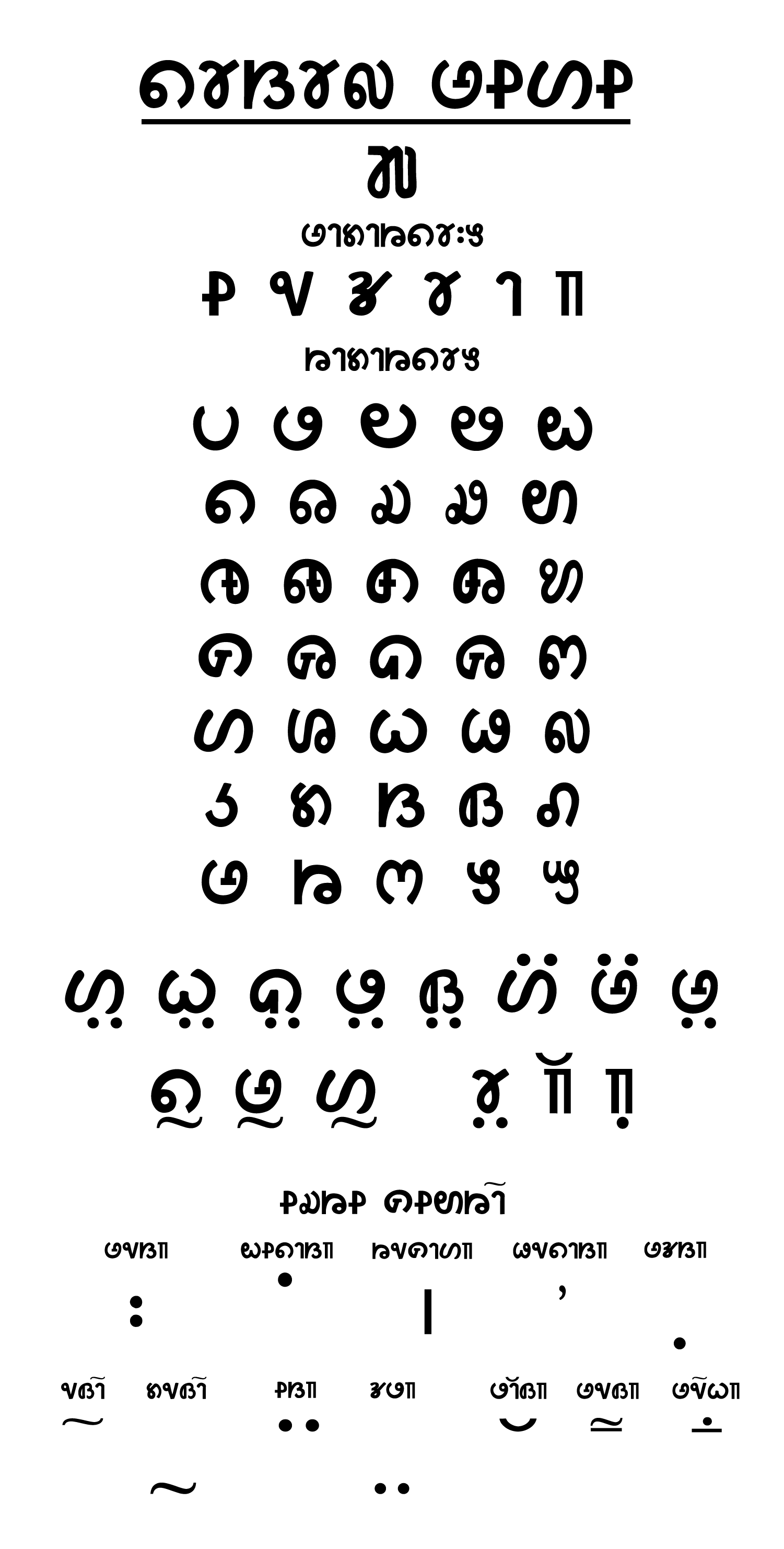
Tolong Siki Aksharamala (Constructed alphabetic script used for Kurukh)

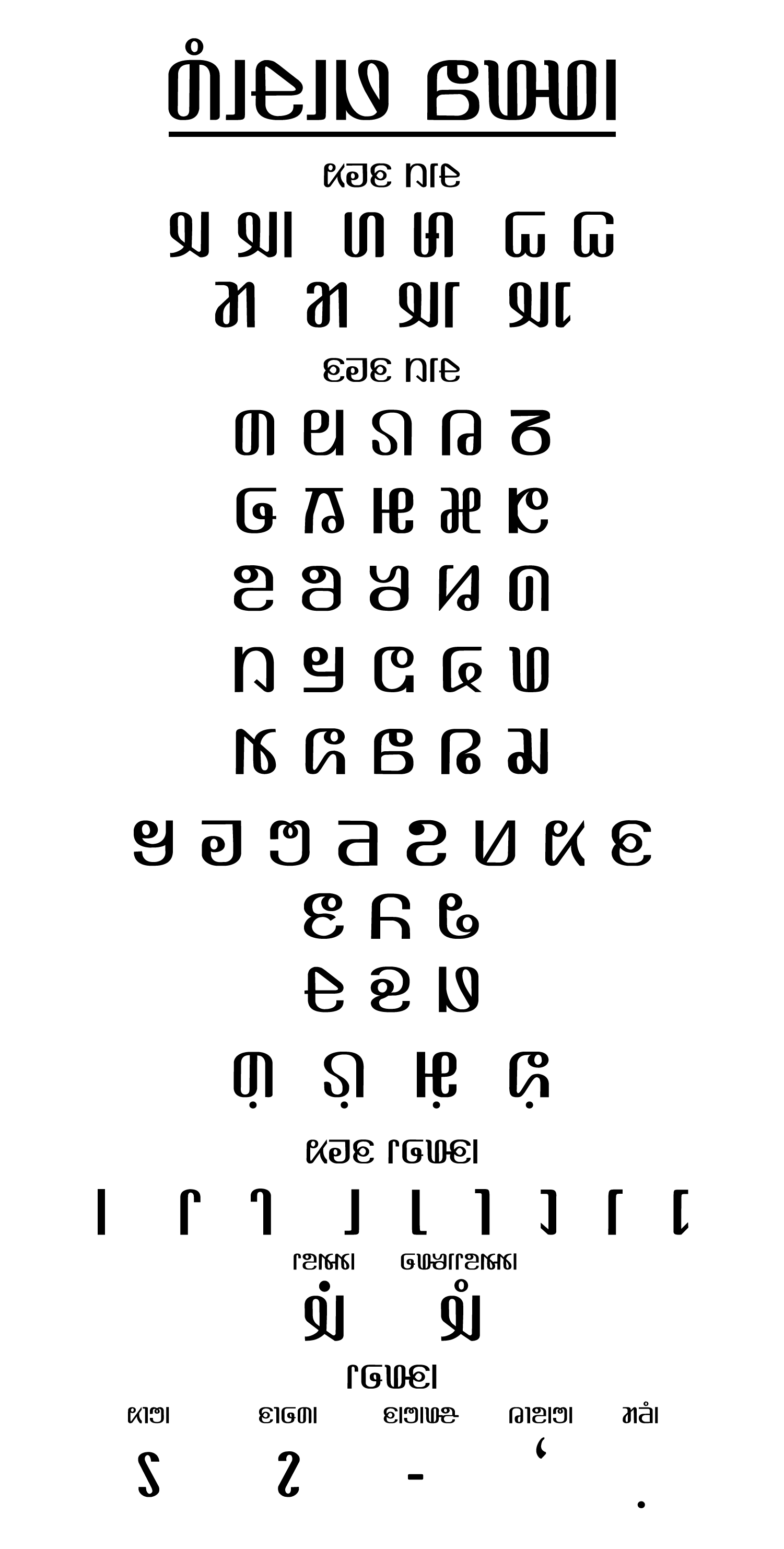
Kurukh Banna Aksharamala (Constructed abugida script used for Kurukh)

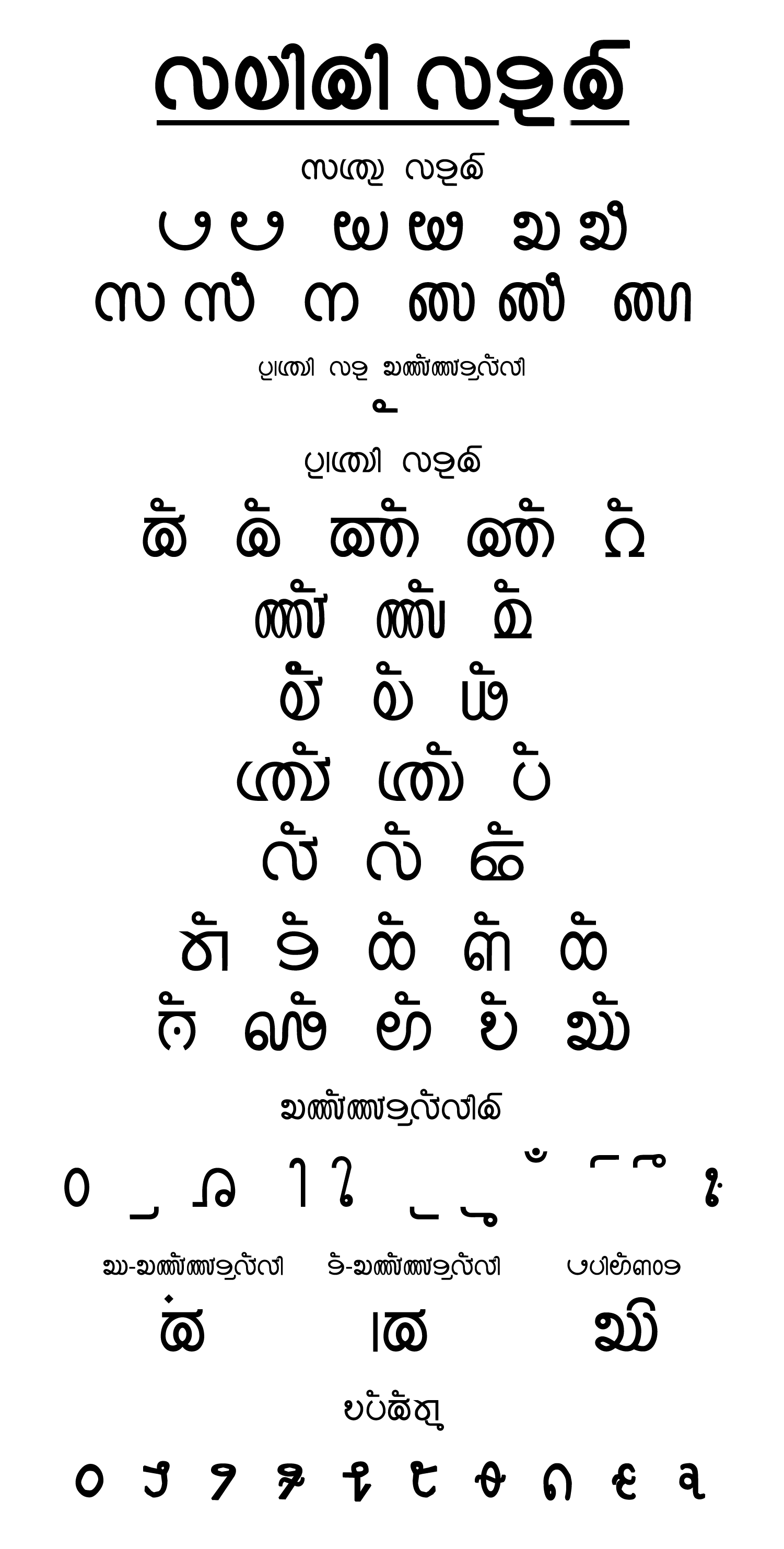
Badagu Barego (Constructed script used for the Badaga language)

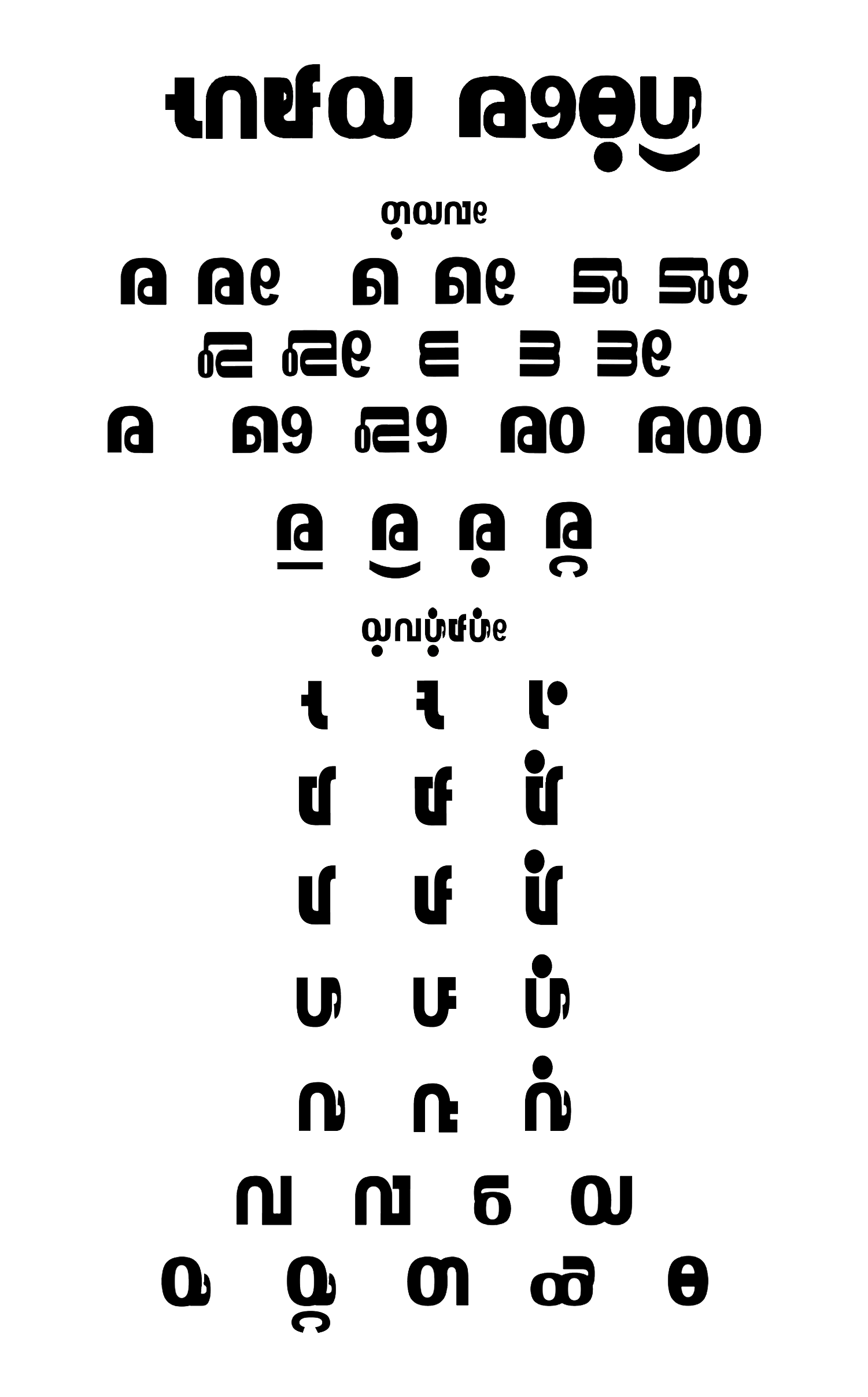
Kodava E'lth Mala (Constructed script officially adopted for the Kodava language)

== See also ==
- Devanagari transliteration
  - International Alphabet of Sanskrit Transliteration
  - National Library at Kolkata romanisation
- Bharati Braille, the unified braille assignments of Indian languages
- Indus script – symbols produced by the Indus Valley Civilisation
- Indian Script Code for Information Interchange (ISCII) – the coding scheme specifically designed to represent Indic scripts
