= Au (Indic) =

Letter "Au" in Indic scripts

Example glyphs
- Bengali–Assamese: ঔ
- Tibetan: ཨཽ
- Tamil: ஔ
- Malayalam: ഔ
- Sinhala: ඖ
- Ashoka Brahmi: 𑀒
- Devanagari: औ

Cognates
- Hebrew: ו
- Greek: Ϝ (Ϛ), Υ (Ȣ)
- Latin: F, V, U, W, Y, Ⅎ
- Cyrillic: Ѕ, У (Ꙋ), Ѵ, Ю

Properties
- Phonemic representation: /ɐːʊ/ /ou/ /ɔː/
- IAST transliteration: au Au
- ISCII code point: B1 (177)

Au is a vowel of Indic abugidas. In modern Indic scripts, Au is derived from the middle "Kushana" Brahmi letter, and the Gupta letter. As an Indic vowel, Au comes in two normally distinct forms: 1) as an independent letter, and 2) as a vowel sign for modifying a base consonant. Bare consonants without a modifying vowel sign have the inherent "A" vowel.

== Āryabhaṭa numeration ==
Aryabhata used Devanagari letters for numbers, very similar to the Greek numerals, even after the invention of Indian numerals. The ौ sign was used to modify a consonant's value ×10^{16}, but the vowel letter औ did not have an inherent value by itself.

== Historic Au ==
There are three different general early historic scripts - Brahmi and its variants, Kharoṣṭhī, and Tocharian, the so-called slanting Brahmi. Au was not found in the earliest forms of Brahmi, but was found in the more flowing forms the Kushana and Gupta. Like all Brahmic scripts, Tocharian Au has an accompanying vowel mark for modifying a base consonant. In Kharoṣṭhī, the only independent vowel letter is for the inherent A. All other independent vowels, including Au are indicated with vowel marks added to the letter A.

=== Brahmi Au ===
The Brahmi letter Au, is based on the letter O which was probably derived from the Aramaic Waw. That would make it related to the modern Latin F, V, U, W, Y and Greek Upsilon. Several identifiable styles of writing the Brahmi Au can be found, most associated with a specific set of inscriptions from an artifact or diverse records from an historic period. As the earliest and most geometric style of Brahmi, the letters found on the Edicts of Ashoka and other records from around that time are normally the reference form for Brahmi letters, but only being found in later styles, the reference form of Brahmi Au is back-formed from later styles to match the geometric writing style.

Brahmi Au historic forms
Ashoka (3rd-1st c. BCE)	Girnar (~150 BCE)	Kushana (~150-250 CE)	Gujarat (~250 CE)	Gupta (~350 CE)

=== Tocharian Au ===
The Tocharian letter is derived from the Brahmi. Unlike some of the consonants, Tocharian vowels do not have a Fremdzeichen form.

Tocharian consonants with Au vowel marks
Kau	Khau	Gau	Ghau	Cau	Chau	Jau	Jhau	Nyau	Ṭau	Ṭhau	Ḍau	Ḍhau	Ṇau
Tau	Thau	Dau	Dhau	Nau	Pau	Phau	Bau	Bhau	Mau	Yau	Rau	Lau	Vau
Śau	Ṣau	Sau	Hau										

=== Kharoṣṭhī Au ===
The Kharoṣṭhī letter Au is indicated with the O vowel mark plus the vowel length mark. As an independent vowel, Au is indicated by adding the vowel marks to the independent vowel letter A.

== Devanagari Au ==
Devanagari independent Au and Au vowel sign.

Au (ओ) is a vowel of the Devanagari abugida. It ultimately arose from the Brahmi letter, after having gone through the Gupta letter. Letters that derive from it are the Gujarati letter ઔ, and the Modi letter 𑘍.

=== Devanagari Using Languages ===
The Devanagari script is used to write the Hindi language, Sanskrit and the majority of Indo-Aryan languages. In most of these languages, ओ is pronounced as [ɔ]. Like all Indic scripts, Devanagari vowels come in two forms: an independent vowel form for syllables that begin with a vowel sound, and a vowel sign attached to base consonant to override the inherent /ə/ vowel.

== Bengali Au ==
Bengali independent Au and Au vowel sign.

Au (ঔ) is a vowel of the Bengali abugida. It is derived from the Siddhaṃ letter, and is marked by the lack of horizontal head line and less geometric shape than its Devanagari counterpart, ओ.

=== Bengali Script Using Languages ===
The Bengali script is used to write several languages of eastern India, notably the Bengali language and Assamese. In most languages, ঔ is pronounced as [ou]. Like all Indic scripts, Bengali vowels come in two forms: an independent vowel form for syllables that begin with a vowel sound, and a vowel sign attached to base consonant to override the inherent /ɔ/ vowel.

== Gujarati Au ==
Gujarati independent Au and Au vowel sign.

Au (ઔ) is a vowel of the Gujarati abugida. It is derived from the Devanagari Au, and ultimately the Brahmi letter.

=== Gujarati-using Languages ===
The Gujarati script is used to write the Gujarati and Kutchi languages. In both languages, ઔ is pronounced as [au]. Like all Indic scripts, Gujarati vowels come in two forms: an independent vowel form for syllables that begin with a vowel sound, and a vowel sign attached to base consonant to override the inherent /ə/ vowel.

== Telugu Au ==
Telugu independent vowel and vowel sign Au.

Au (ఔ) is a vowel of the Telugu abugida. It ultimately arose from the Brahmi letter. It is closely related to the Kannada letter ಔ. Like in other Indic scripts, Telugu vowels have two forms: and independent letter for word and syllable-initial vowel sounds, and a vowel sign for changing the inherent "a" of Telugu consonant letters. Vowel signs in Telugu can interact with a base consonant in one of three ways: 1) the vowel sign touches or sits adjacent to the base consonant without modifying the shape of either 2) the vowel sign sits directly above the consonant, replacing its v-shaped headline, 3) the vowel sign and consonant interact, forming a ligature.

Telugu Au vowel sign on క, ఖ, గ, ఘ & ఙ: Kau, Khau, Gau, Ghau and Ngau. Note that how the vowel sign interacts with the base consonant is dependent on the location of the headline, the absence of a headline, and the presence of a tail to attach to.

== Malayalam Au ==
Malayalam independent vowel and vowel sign Au.

Au (ഔ) is a vowel of the Malayalam abugida. It ultimately arose from the Brahmi letter, via the Grantha letter au. Like in other Indic scripts, Malayalam vowels have two forms: an independent letter for word and syllable-initial vowel sounds, and a vowel sign for changing the inherent "a" of consonant letters. Vowel signs in Malayalam usually sit adjacent to its base consonant - below, to the left, right, or both left and right, but are always pronounced after the consonant sound.

== Odia Au ==
Odia independent vowel and vowel sign Au.

Au (ଔ) is a vowel of the Odia abugida. It ultimately arose from the Brahmi letter, via the Siddhaṃ letter au. Like in other Indic scripts, Odia vowels have two forms: an independent letter for word and syllable-initial vowel sounds, and a vowel sign for changing the inherent "a" of consonant letters. Vowel signs in Odia usually sit adjacent to its base consonant - below, to the left, right, or both left and right, but are always pronounced after the consonant sound. No base consonants are altered in form when adding a vowel sign, and there are no consonant+vowel ligatures in Odia.

== Kaithi Au ==
Kaithi independent vowel and vowel sign Au.

Au (𑂌) is a vowel of the Kaithi abugida. It ultimately arose from the Brahmi letter, via the Siddhaṃ letter Au. Like in other Indic scripts, Kaithi vowels have two forms: an independent letter for word and syllable-initial vowel sounds, and a vowel sign for changing the inherent "a" of consonant letters. Vowel signs in Kaithi usually sit adjacent to its base consonant - below, to the left, right, or both left and right, but are always pronounced after the consonant sound. No base consonants are altered in form when adding a vowel sign, and there are no consonant+vowel ligatures in Kaithi.

== Tirhuta Au ==
Tirhuta independent vowel and vowel sign Au.

Au (𑒎) is a vowel of the Tirhuta abugida. It ultimately arose from the Brahmi letter, via the Siddhaṃ letter Au. Like in other Indic scripts, Tirhuta vowels have two forms: an independent letter for word and syllable-initial vowel sounds, and a vowel sign for changing the inherent "a" of consonant letters. Vowel signs in Tirhuta usually sit adjacent to its base consonant - below, to the left, right, or both left and right, but are always pronounced after the consonant sound. No consonants are altered in form when adding the Au vowel mark, although there are some consonant+vowel ligatures in Tirhuta.

== Comparison of Au ==
The various Indic scripts are generally related to each other through adaptation and borrowing, and as such the glyphs for cognate letters, including Au, are related as well.

Comparison of Au in different scripts

Aramaic
Kharoṣṭhī 𐨆𐨌	Ashoka Brahmi 𑀒 / 𑁅	Kushana Brahmi (Note: The middle "Kushana" form of Brahmi is a later style that emerged as Brahmi scripts were beginning to proliferate. Gupta Brahmi was definitely a stylistic descendant from Kushana, but other Brahmi-derived scripts may have descended from earlier forms.) / 𑁅	Tocharian (Note: Tocharian is probably derived from the middle period "Kushana" form of Brahmi, although artifacts from that time are not plentiful enough to establish a definite succession.)
Gupta Brahmi / 𑁅	Pallava
Kadamba -
Bhaiksuki 𑰍 / 𑰻	Siddhaṃ / 𑖻	Grantha 𑌔 / 𑍌	Cham ꨯꨱ
Sinhala ඖ / ෞ	Pyu / Old Mon (Note: Pyu and Old Mon are probably the precursors of the Burmese script, and may be derived from either the Pallava or Kadamba script) -
Tibetan ཽ	Newa 𑐍 / 𑑁	Ahom 𑜧	Malayalam ഔ / ൌ
Telugu ఔ / ౌ	Burmese ဪ / ော်
Lepcha -	Ranjana	Saurashtra ꢑ / ꣁ	Dives Akuru -
Kannada ಔ / ೌ	Kayah Li -
Limbu ᤦ	Soyombo (Note: May also be derived from Devangari (see bottom left of table)) 𑩘	Khmer ឳ / ៅ	Tamil ஔ / ௌ
Chakma 𑄯	Tai Tham -
Meitei Mayek ꫮ / ꫯ	Gaudi -	Thai เ◌า	Lao ເ◌ົາ
Tai Le ᥬ
Marchen -	Tirhuta 𑒎 / 𑒽	New Tai Lue -	Tai Viet ꪹ◌ꪱ	Aksara Kawi 𑼐𑼴 / 𑼿𑼴
'Phags-pa -	Odia ଔ / ୌ	Sharada 𑆐 / 𑆿	Rejang ꥌ	Batak -	Buginese -
Zanabazar Square 𑨈	Bengali–Assamese ঔ / ৌ	Takri 𑚉 / 𑚵	Javanese ꦎꦴ / ꦻꦴ	Balinese ᬒ / ᭁ	Makasar -
Hangul (Note: The Origin of Hangul from 'Phags-pa is one of limited influence, inspiring at most a few basic letter shapes. Hangul does not function as an Indic abugida.) -	Northern Nagari -	Dogri 𑠉 / 𑠶	Laṇḍā -	Sundanese -	Baybayin -
Modi 𑘍 / 𑘼	Gujarati ઔ / ૌ	Khojki 𑈇 / 𑈳	Khudabadi 𑊹 / 𑋨	Mahajani -	Tagbanwa -
Devanagari औ / ौ	Nandinagari 𑦭 / 𑧝	Kaithi / 𑂸	Gurmukhi ਔ / ੌ	Multani -	Buhid -
Canadian Syllabics (Note: Although the basic letter forms of the Canadian Aboriginal Syllabics were derived from handwritten Devanagari letters, this abugida indicates vowel sounds by rotations of the letter form, rather than the use of vowel diacritics as is standard in Indic abugidas.) -	Soyombo (Note: May also be derived from Ranjana (see above)) 𑩘	Sylheti Nagari -	Gunjala Gondi 𑵫 / 𑶔	Masaram Gondi (Note: Masaram Gondi acts as an Indic abugida, but its letterforms were not derived from any single precursor script.) 𑴋 / 𑴿	Hanuno'o -

== Character encodings of Au ==
Most Indic scripts are encoded in the Unicode Standard, and as such the letter Au in those scripts can be represented in plain text with unique codepoint. Au from several modern-use scripts can also be found in legacy encodings, such as ISCII.

Character information
Preview	औ		ঔ		ஔ		ఔ		ଔ		ಔ		ഔ		ઔ		ਔ	
Unicode name	DEVANAGARI LETTER AU		BENGALI LETTER AU		TAMIL LETTER AU		TELUGU LETTER AU		ORIYA LETTER AU		KANNADA LETTER AU		MALAYALAM LETTER AU		GUJARATI LETTER AU		GURMUKHI LETTER AU	
Encodings	decimal	hex	dec	hex	dec	hex	dec	hex	dec	hex	dec	hex	dec	hex	dec	hex	dec	hex
Unicode	2324	U+0914	2452	U+0994	2964	U+0B94	3092	U+0C14	2836	U+0B14	3220	U+0C94	3348	U+0D14	2708	U+0A94	2580	U+0A14
UTF-8	224 164 148	E0 A4 94	224 166 148	E0 A6 94	224 174 148	E0 AE 94	224 176 148	E0 B0 94	224 172 148	E0 AC 94	224 178 148	E0 B2 94	224 180 148	E0 B4 94	224 170 148	E0 AA 94	224 168 148	E0 A8 94
Numeric character reference	&#2324;	&#x914;	&#2452;	&#x994;	&#2964;	&#xB94;	&#3092;	&#xC14;	&#2836;	&#xB14;	&#3220;	&#xC94;	&#3348;	&#xD14;	&#2708;	&#xA94;	&#2580;	&#xA14;
ISCII	177	B1	177	B1	177	B1	177	B1	177	B1	177	B1	177	B1	177	B1	177	B1

Character information
Preview	Ashoka𑀒 Kushana Gupta				𑌔	
Unicode name	BRAHMI LETTER AU		SIDDHAM LETTER AU		GRANTHA LETTER AU	
Encodings	decimal	hex	dec	hex	dec	hex
Unicode	69650	U+11012	71053	U+1158D	70420	U+11314
UTF-8	240 145 128 146	F0 91 80 92	240 145 150 141	F0 91 96 8D	240 145 140 148	F0 91 8C 94
UTF-16	55300 56338	D804 DC12	55301 56717	D805 DD8D	55300 57108	D804 DF14
Numeric character reference	&#69650;	&#x11012;	&#71053;	&#x1158D;	&#70420;	&#x11314;

Character information
Preview	𑐍		𑰍		𑆐	
Unicode name	NEWA LETTER AU		BHAIKSUKI LETTER AU		SHARADA LETTER AU	
Encodings	decimal	hex	dec	hex	dec	hex
Unicode	70669	U+1140D	72717	U+11C0D	70032	U+11190
UTF-8	240 145 144 141	F0 91 90 8D	240 145 176 141	F0 91 B0 8D	240 145 134 144	F0 91 86 90
UTF-16	55301 56333	D805 DC0D	55303 56333	D807 DC0D	55300 56720	D804 DD90
Numeric character reference	&#70669;	&#x1140D;	&#72717;	&#x11C0D;	&#70032;	&#x11190;

Character information
Preview	ဪ	
Unicode name	MYANMAR LETTER AU	
Encodings	decimal	hex
Unicode	4138	U+102A
UTF-8	225 128 170	E1 80 AA
Numeric character reference	&#4138;	&#x102A;

Character information
Preview	ឳ		ꪻ	
Unicode name	KHMER INDEPENDENT VOWEL QAU		TAI VIET VOWEL AUE	
Encodings	decimal	hex	dec	hex
Unicode	6067	U+17B3	43707	U+AABB
UTF-8	225 158 179	E1 9E B3	234 170 187	EA AA BB
Numeric character reference	&#6067;	&#x17B3;	&#43707;	&#xAABB;

Character information
Preview	ඖ		ᥬ		ꢑ	
Unicode name	SINHALA LETTER AUYANNA		TAI LE LETTER AUE		SAURASHTRA LETTER AU	
Encodings	decimal	hex	dec	hex	dec	hex
Unicode	3478	U+0D96	6508	U+196C	43153	U+A891
UTF-8	224 182 150	E0 B6 96	225 165 172	E1 A5 AC	234 162 145	EA A2 91
Numeric character reference	&#3478;	&#xD96;	&#6508;	&#x196C;	&#43153;	&#xA891;

Character information
Preview	𑘍		𑦭		𑵫			
Unicode name	MODI LETTER AU		NANDINAGARI LETTER AU		GUNJALA GONDI LETTER AU		KAITHI LETTER AU	
Encodings	decimal	hex	dec	hex	dec	hex	dec	hex
Unicode	71181	U+1160D	72109	U+119AD	73067	U+11D6B	69772	U+1108C
UTF-8	240 145 152 141	F0 91 98 8D	240 145 166 173	F0 91 A6 AD	240 145 181 171	F0 91 B5 AB	240 145 130 140	F0 91 82 8C
UTF-16	55301 56845	D805 DE0D	55302 56749	D806 DDAD	55303 56683	D807 DD6B	55300 56460	D804 DC8C
Numeric character reference	&#71181;	&#x1160D;	&#72109;	&#x119AD;	&#73067;	&#x11D6B;	&#69772;	&#x1108C;

Character information
Preview	𑒎	
Unicode name	TIRHUTA LETTER AU	
Encodings	decimal	hex
Unicode	70798	U+1148E
UTF-8	240 145 146 142	F0 91 92 8E
UTF-16	55301 56462	D805 DC8E
Numeric character reference	&#70798;	&#x1148E;

Character information
Preview	𑚉		𑠉		𑈇		𑊹	
Unicode name	TAKRI LETTER AU		DOGRA LETTER AU		KHOJKI LETTER AU		KHUDAWADI LETTER AU	
Encodings	decimal	hex	dec	hex	dec	hex	dec	hex
Unicode	71305	U+11689	71689	U+11809	70151	U+11207	70329	U+112B9
UTF-8	240 145 154 137	F0 91 9A 89	240 145 160 137	F0 91 A0 89	240 145 136 135	F0 91 88 87	240 145 138 185	F0 91 8A B9
UTF-16	55301 56969	D805 DE89	55302 56329	D806 DC09	55300 56839	D804 DE07	55300 57017	D804 DEB9
Numeric character reference	&#71305;	&#x11689;	&#71689;	&#x11809;	&#70151;	&#x11207;	&#70329;	&#x112B9;

Character information
Preview	ᬒ	
Unicode name	BALINESE LETTER OKARA TEDUNG	
Encodings	decimal	hex
Unicode	6930	U+1B12
UTF-8	225 172 146	E1 AC 92
Numeric character reference	&#6930;	&#x1B12;

Character information
Preview	𑴋	
Unicode name	MASARAM GONDI LETTER AU	
Encodings	decimal	hex
Unicode	72971	U+11D0B
UTF-8	240 145 180 139	F0 91 B4 8B
UTF-16	55303 56587	D807 DD0B
Numeric character reference	&#72971;	&#x11D0B;
