= King Narasimha =

King of Oiniwar Dynasty in Mithila

Narasimha
- King of Mithila
- Predecessor: Harasimha
- Successor: Dhirasimha
- Born: Mithila
- Wife: Dhiramati
- Kingdom: Mithila Kingdom
- Dynasty: Oiniwar Dynasty
- Religion: Hinduism
- Occupation: King of Mithila

Narasimha (Maithili: नर सिंह) was the twelfth king of the Oiniwar Dynasty in the Mithila Kingdom of the Indian subcontinent. He ruled the kingdom around 1453 CE. He ascended the throne of Mithila Kingdom after the King Harisimha.

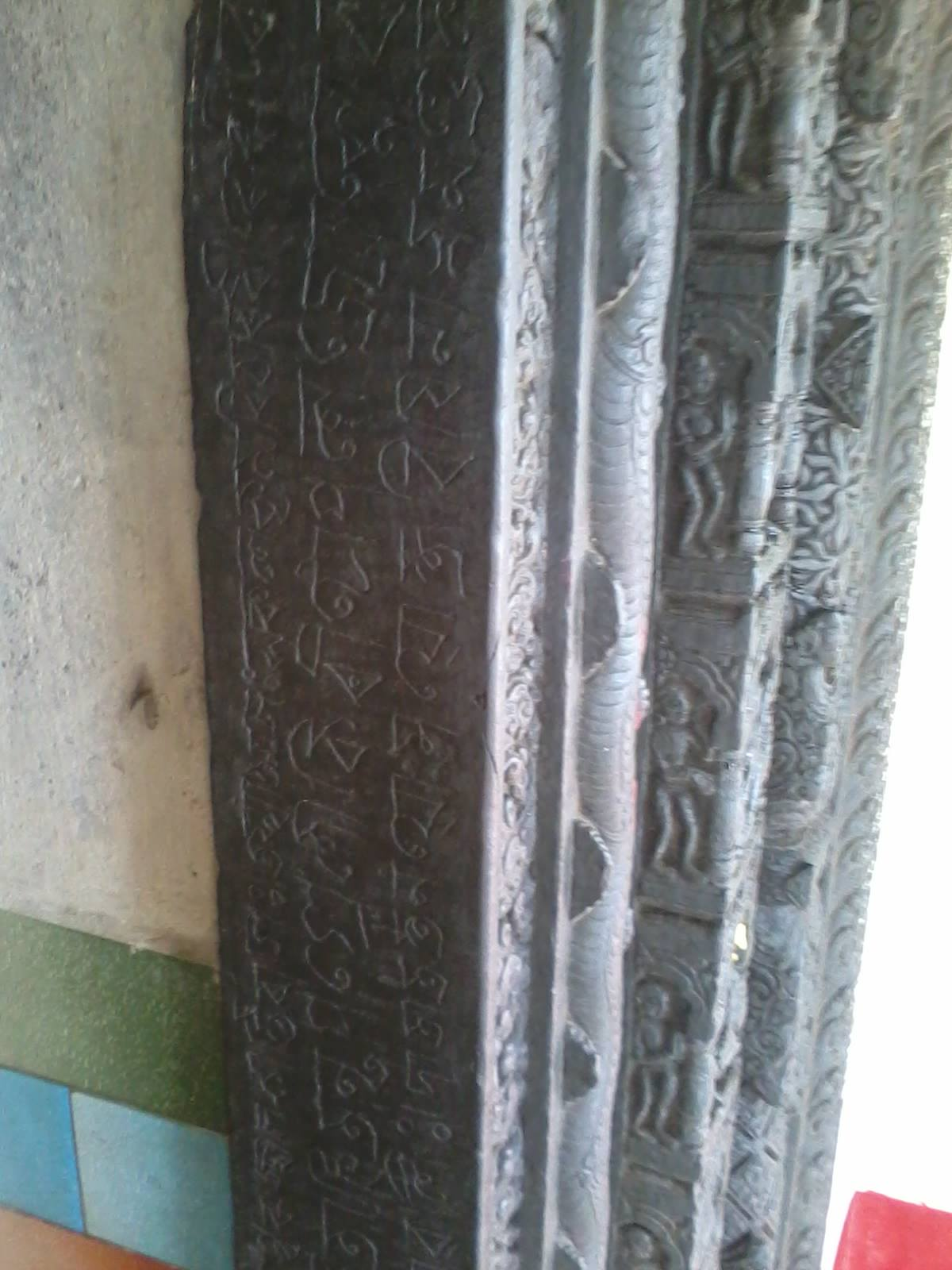
Inscription of King Narsimha of the Oiniwar Dynasty of Mithila in the Tirhuta scripts at the Kandaha Sun Temple in Saharsa, Bihar

== Early life ==
Narasimha was born in the royal family of the Oiniwar Dynasty in Mithila. His was the son of the King Harisimha. He was a Maithil Brahmin and belonged to Kashyap Gotra.

== Later life ==
Narasimha was married to the woman scholar Dhiramati. He had three sons. Later, Narasimha became the successor of King Harisimha in the Oiniwar dynasty of Mithila. In the inscription of the Kandaha Abhilekha, he is mentioned as a brave person as well as a thinker. According to the inscriptions, he was a great donor as well as a dhirvir which translates to steadfast warrior or a person having patience.

He is also mentioned in the text Shaivasarvasvasaara composed by the Maithil scholar Vidyapati. In the text, he is praised greatly by the poet Vidyapati.
