= Assamese script =

Writing system for some Indic languages

Assamese Kamarupi
- The Assamese or Kamarupi script.
- Script type: Abugida
- Period: c. 13th century CE to present (declining since 20th century)
- Region: Northeast India (primarily Assam)
- Languages: Assamese, Sanskrit, Kamtapuri

Related scripts
- Parent systems: Egyptian: Proto-Sinaitic; Phoenician; Aramaic (debated); Brahmi; Gupta; Siddham; Proto-BAMO; Assamese
- Sister systems: Bengali, Tirhuta, Odia, Newari

Unicode
- Unicode range: Not in Unicode

A traditional writing system of Assam that is now endangered.

The Assamese script or Kamarupi script refers to the traditional writing system derived from Brahmi that developed as a distinct paleographic tradition in the Brahmaputra valley from the 5th century until the mid-20th century. The Assamese script first took its form in the 13th century and continued until the mid-20th century. Its earliest predecessor in Assam, the Ancient Kamarupi script, evolved through Gupta and Northern Indian script varieties, maintaining a cultural individuality that branched off from the common Eastern Indian script-group at a stage distinct from its relatives, such as Bengali or Maithili. Before the 20th century, the script was characterised by a variety of styles—specifically Gorgoya, Bamunia, and Kaitheli—used for royal chronicles, administrative charters, and liturgical manuscripts.

The Assamese script is paleographically distinct from the modern Assamese alphabet, which is the standardized version based on the Bengali script, used today. The modern alphabet is characterised by a significant shift that occurred in the mid-19th century when the Assamese script was replaced by the Bengali script types for the technical convenience of the printing press. The original Assamese script possessed unique conjunct forms and structural attributes that make older manuscripts largely unintelligible to modern readers trained only in the current standardized Bengali-based alphabet.

== History and evolution ==
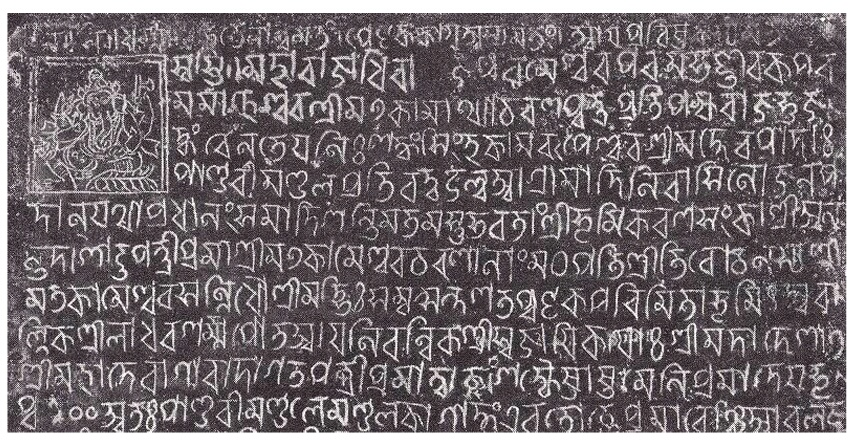
Copperplate inscription of Nilachal King Madhavadeva, dated to 15th century.

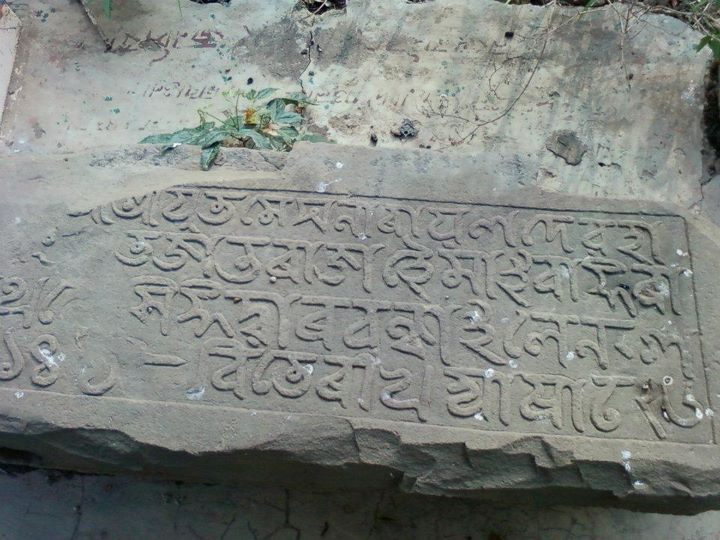
The Maibang inscription of 1576.

The historical trajectory of the script is formally categorised into four evolutionary stages: the ancient Kamrupi script, the Proto-Assamese script, the Assamese script, and the colonial-era Bengali–Assamese script.

- Ancient Kamrupi (5th–12th century): The formative stage, known as the ancient Kamrupi script, covers the range of paleographic specimens available from the 5th century A.D. to the 12th century A.D. Its earliest manifestations are found in the Umachal rock-inscription (5th century) and the Badganga rock-inscription (6th century), which were written in the Eastern variety of the Northern Indian alphabet. A major turning point occurred in the 7th century with the Nidhanpur copperplates, which introduced the halanta (vowelless consonant) sign and reflected a transition where the script began absorbing more developed Western variant traits. This stage reached its "culminating point" in the 12th century, by which time many vowel initials and consonants had attained shapes that conform to their modern counterparts.
- Proto-Assamese (10th–12th century): The Proto-Assamese stage emerged as a bridge between the ancient Kamrupi forms and the medieval Assamese script, beginning around the 10th century A.D. During this period, the script gained the "type-fossils" of almost all its letters and developed a distinctive "tail-like formation" at the bottom of the vertical strokes while maintaining the inward bend characteristic of the kutila style. This stage is represented by inscriptions such as those of Dharmapala and Vaidyadeva, which show the script reaching a "settled state" through the enrichments of local scribes and engravers by the end of the 12th century.
- Assamese (13th–20th century): The period of the "pure Assamese script" began in the 13th century. This stage is marked by a "distinct break" from the mere regional variations of Brahmi, as seen in the Kanai-Barasibowa rock inscription of 1205 A.D. Evidence for the use of the script between the 14th and 16th centuries is found in inscriptions and artefacts associated with the Kachari and Chutia kingdom. Notable examples from the Kachari domain include stone inscriptions from Gachtal, Davaka (1362 CE), and Lanka (1352 CE), as well as a victory coin dated to 1520 CE. From the Chutia polity, surviving records comprise six copperplate grants (1392-1522 CE), one stone inscription (1442 CE), and several brick inscriptions.

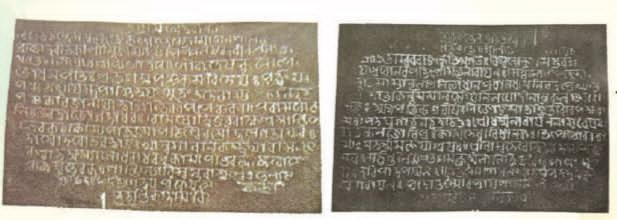
The Bormurtia Copperplate inscription of king Satyanarayan written in Assamese alphabet dated to 1392, showing the Assamese script prevalent in Upper Assam in the late 14th century.

By the 17th century, letterforms had fully stabilised, and the script used in Assam maintained a distinctive independence from neighbouring systems until the mid-19th century and was continued to be used in satras and villages during the 20th century.

By the 18th and 19th centuries, the script matured through a specialised manuscript tradition on Xãsipat and branched into three prominent socio-cultural styles:

  - Gargayan (Gorgoyã): A metropolitan style used in Ahom royal archives for chronicles (Buranjis), noted for its symmetry, legibility, and simplicity.
  - Bamuniya: A style used by the Sanskrit-knowing scholarly elite in Satras for religious texts; this style maintained the closest resemblance to the modern Bengali form.
  - Kaitheli or Lahkari (Lohkori): A documentary style used by professional scribes for mathematical treatises, land grants, and royal charters. It was highly ornate, featuring sharp angles and the "huddling" of word groupings.

- Bengali–Assamese (19th century–present): The final stage, styled as the period of the Bengali–Assamese script, began in the early 19th century and is characterised by the displacement of the traditional script by the Bengali script. For technical reasons and convenience of printing, Christian missionaries at the Serampore Press utilized blocks of letters meant for the Bengali script to print the first Assamese translation of the New Testament in 1813. As a result, the traditional Assamese script was abandoned in the printing medium in favour of the Bengali standard. Although an attempt was made in 1833 to create conjunct consonants based on the historical Assamese script, this effort was subsequently abandoned and the script was completely replaced by the Bengali script. The Calcutta press further solidified this replacement by using the standard Bengali foundry for Assamese without developing a separate font or adding more than a few Assamese letters. Because the historical Assamese and Bengali scripts possessed significant differences, particularly in conjunct forms, this replacement has rendered the traditional Assamese script largely unintelligible to the modern population. The current Assamese alphabet is characterised by its unique r and v/w, not found in the current Bengali alphabet, however they were historically alternatively used in the Bengali script as well.

== Distinctive structural and orthographic features ==
Prior to 19th-century standardization, the Assamese script featured unique paleographic markers that distinguished it from neighbouring scripts:

- Unique Characters: The script has unique characters like a, ā, i, ī, gh, ṭh, ś, etc as well as certain numerals and ligatures that distinguish it from the current modified standard as well as from other neighbouring scripts.
- Distinct Characters: The script historically reserved a cross-cut r and dotted versions of ḍ, ḍh, y, and v were established to differentiate them from other phonetically similar letters and to represent specific phonetic transformations inherent in Assamese speech.
- Letterforms: Notable features included the tripartite y and the independent status of the ligature kṣ, which reflected a distinctive local phonetic bias.
- Diacritics and Ornaments: Scribes in the Kaitheli and Bamuniya traditions often employed a "Nepalese hook" and "pigtails" on the main bodies of letters like h and t.

== Manuscript culture and historical usage ==
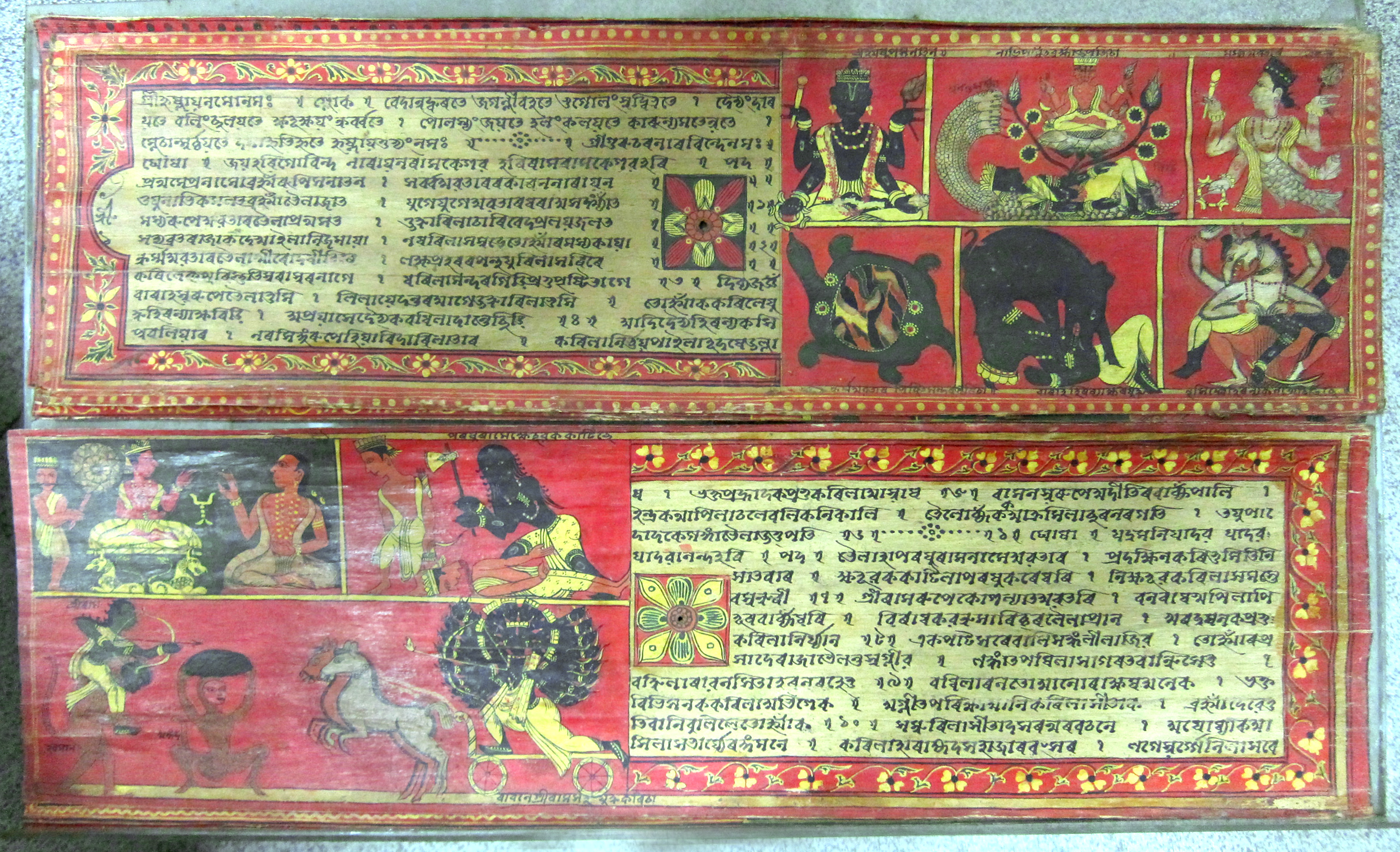
A kirtan manuscript in Assamese.

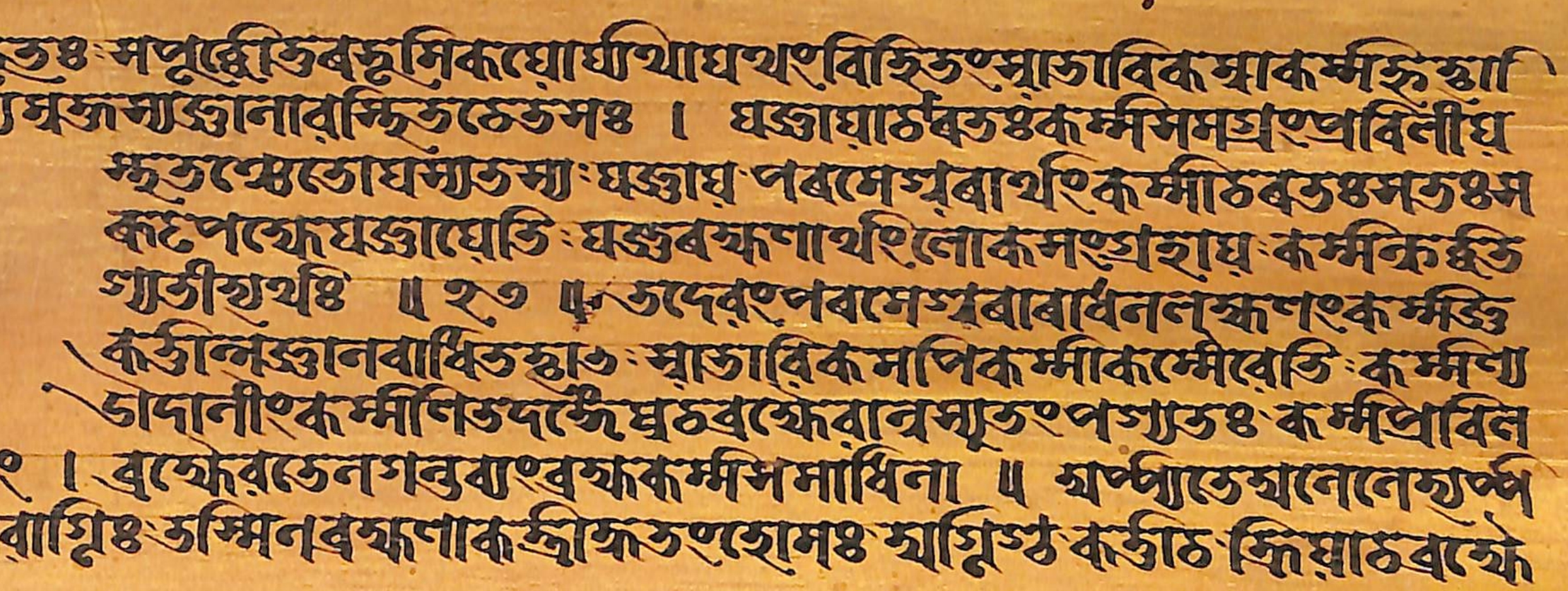
Gitasubodhini manuscript (Sanskrit), made in 1879, written in the mixed Kaitheli style.

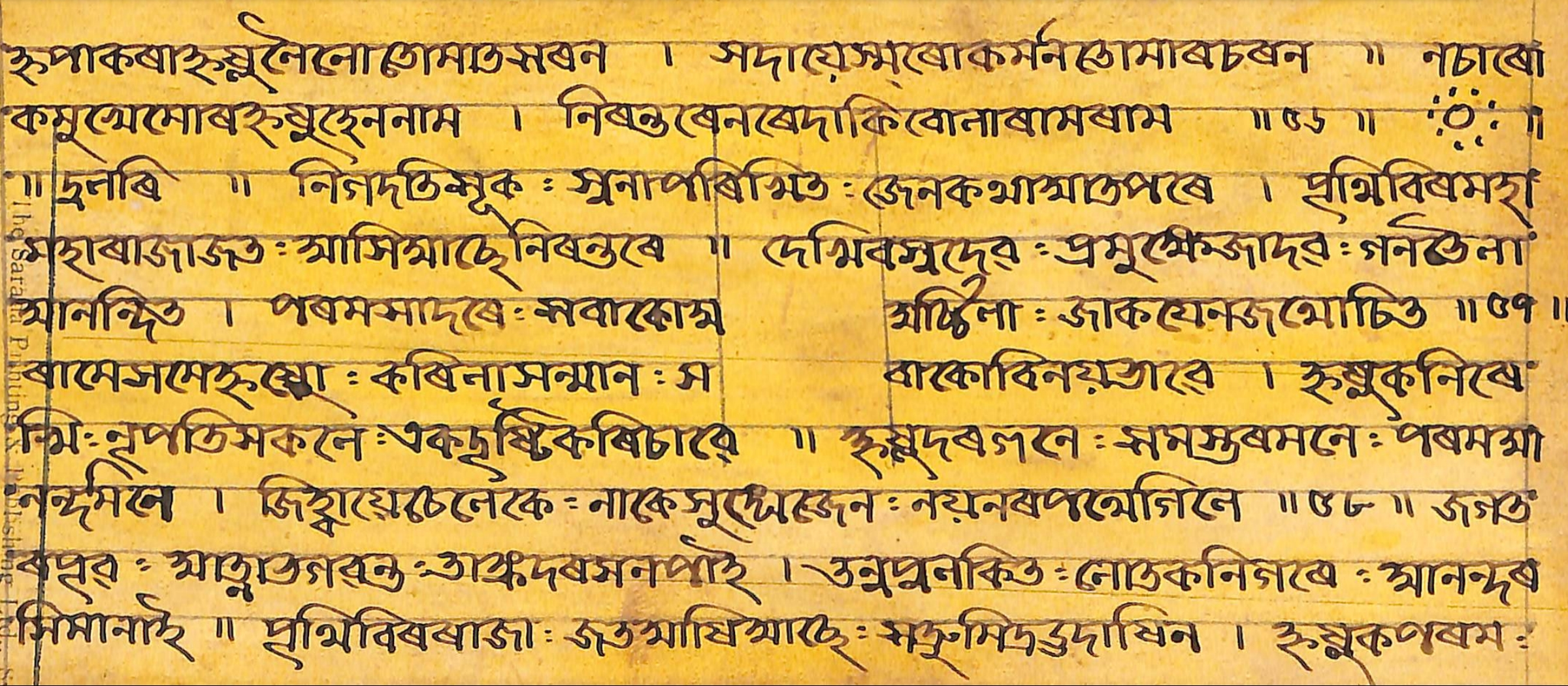
Kurukhyetra manuscript (Assamese), made in 1946, written in the Kaitheli style.

The Assamese script was preserved through a specialised manuscript tradition. The primary writing material was Xãsipat (bark of the agar tree), which underwent a laborious process of seasoning and rubbings with burnt brick or conch shells to create a glossy surface. Other materials included Tulapat (cotton paper), muga silk cloth, and ivory boards.

Manuscripts were written using a reed-stalk pen (nol-khagori), facilitating the elegant curves and angles of the cursive styles. This tradition was maintained primarily in Satras (Vaishnava monasteries) and the Ahom royal court, where scribes were commissioned to produce religious kavyas and secular chronicles.

== The 19th-20th century adoption of Bengali script and decline of Assamese script ==
The transition to the modern alphabet (a version of the Bengali script) began in 1813 when the Serampore Press published the first Assamese printed book, an Assamese translation of the New Testament titled Natun Niyam. For the "sake of convenience of printing," the Assamese script was abandoned in favour of Bengali movable type blocks incised by Panchanan Karmakar. This decision was made by colonial missionaries without the consultation of the Assamese people or their royalty.

In 1833, a translator and blockmaker named Atmaram Sarma attempted to reintroduce distinctive Assamese features into the printed alphabet, making it the first printed book in the Assamese script. The Assamese script was also used in Robinson’s ‘’A Grammar of Assamese Language’’ printed in 1839.. However, subsequent printing presses in Calcutta started to use the standard Bengali foundry for Assamese without keeping any unique Assamese letters.

The modern Assamese alphabet is a version of the Bengali script with two unique letters (ra and va) which had been discarded in the Bengali alphabet but kept in the modern Assamese alphabet. The original Assamese script is largely illegible to the people proficient in the modern Bengali-Assamese alphabet. As of 1987, the original Assamese script was legible to 3%-4% of the population, limited to villages and sattras and rare in the urban areas. The widespread usage of the printed Bengali script and the lack of printing press for the Assamese script caused a decline of the Assamese script and resulted in negligence towards it. Today the printed Bengali script is used in Assamese books, including textbooks in schools and colleges. This has led to a scarcity of people who can read the Assamese manuscripts and a barrier towards reading and studying older Assamese literature. The negligence and illegibility has also led to many manuscripts being thrown into rivers and lakes.

The original Assamese script was still being used for handwritten manuscripts throughout the 19th century and early part of the 20th century, with one manuscript written in 1946.
