= O (Indic) =

Letter "O" in Indic scripts

Example glyphs
- Bengali–Assamese: ও
- Tibetan: ཨོ
- Tamil: ஓ
- Thai: โ
- Malayalam: ഒ
- Sinhala: ඕ
- Ashoka Brahmi: O
- Devanagari: ओ

Cognates
- Hebrew: ו
- Greek: Ϝ (Ϛ), Υ (Ȣ)
- Latin: F, V, U, W, Y, Ⅎ
- Cyrillic: Ѕ, У (Ꙋ), Ѵ, Ю

Properties
- Phonemic representation: /oː/
- IAST transliteration: o O
- ISCII code point: B0 (176)

O is a vowel of Indic abugidas. In modern Indic scripts, O is derived from the early "Ashoka" Brahmi letter after having gone through the Gupta letter. As an Indic vowel, O comes in two normally distinct forms: 1) as an independent letter, and 2) as a vowel sign for modifying a base consonant. Bare consonants without a modifying vowel sign have the inherent "A" vowel.

== Āryabhaṭa numeration ==
Aryabhata used Devanagari letters for numbers, very similar to the Greek numerals, even after the invention of Indian numerals. The ो sign was used to modify a consonant's value ×10^{14}, but the vowel letter ओ did not have an inherent value by itself.

== Historic O ==
There are three different general early historic scripts - Brahmi and its variants, Kharoṣṭhī, and Tocharian, the so-called slanting Brahmi. O as found in standard Brahmi, was a simple geometric shape, with variations toward more flowing forms by the Gupta. Like all Brahmic scripts, Tocharian O has an accompanying vowel mark for modifying a base consonant. In Kharoṣṭhī, the only independent vowel letter is for the inherent A. All other independent vowels, including O are indicated with vowel marks added to the letter A.

=== Brahmi O ===
The Brahmi letter O, is probably derived from the altered Aramaic Waw, and is thus related to the modern Latin F, V, U, W, Y and Greek Upsilon. Several identifiable styles of writing the Brahmi O can be found, most associated with a specific set of inscriptions from an artifact or diverse records from an historic period. As the earliest and most geometric style of Brahmi, the letters found on the Edicts of Ashoka and other records from around that time are normally the reference form for Brahmi letters, with some vowel marks not attested until later forms of Brahmi back-formed to match the geometric writing style.

Brahmi O historic forms
Ashoka (3rd-1st c. BCE)	Girnar (~150 BCE)	Kushana (~150-250 CE)	Gujarat (~250 CE)	Gupta (~350 CE)

=== Tocharian O ===
The Tocharian letter is derived from the Brahmi. Unlike some of the consonants, Tocharian vowels do not have a Fremdzeichen form.

Tocharian consonants with O vowel marks
Ko	Kho	Go	Gho	Co	Cho	Jo	Jho	Nyo	Ṭo	Ṭho	Ḍo	Ḍho	Ṇo
To	Tho	Do	Dho	No	Po	Pho	Bo	Bho	Mo	Yo	Ro	Lo	Vo
Śo	Ṣo	So	Ho										

=== Kharoṣṭhī O ===
The Kharoṣṭhī letter O is indicated with the vowel mark. As an independent vowel, O is indicated by adding the vowel marks to the independent vowel letter A.

== Devanagari Ō ==
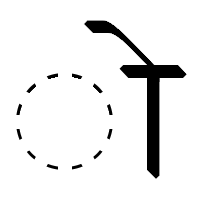
Devanagari independent Ō and Ō vowel sign.

Ō (ओ) is a vowel of the Devanagari abugida. It ultimately arose from the Brahmi letter, after having gone through the Gupta letter. Letters that derive from it are the Gujarati letter ઓ, and the Modi letter 𑘌.

=== Devanagari Using Languages ===
The Devanagari script is used to write the Hindi language, Sanskrit and the majority of Indo-Aryan languages. In most of these languages, ओ is pronounced as [o]. Like all Indic scripts, Devanagari vowels come in two forms: an independent vowel form for syllables that begin with a vowel sound, and a vowel sign attached to base consonant to override the inherent /ə/ vowel.

== Bengali Ō ==
Bengali independent Ō and Ō vowel sign.

Ō (ও) is a vowel of the Bengali abugida. It is derived from the Siddhaṃ letter, and is marked by the lack of horizontal head line and less geometric shape than its Devanagari counterpart, ओ.

=== Bengali Script Using Languages ===
The Bengali script is used to write several languages of eastern India, notably the Bengali language and Assamese. In most languages, ও is pronounced as [o]. Like all Indic scripts, Bengali vowels come in two forms: an independent vowel form for syllables that begin with a vowel sound, and a vowel sign attached to base consonant to override the inherent /ɔ/ vowel.

== Gujarati Ō ==
Gujarati independent O and O vowel sign.

Ō (ઓ) is a vowel of the Gujarati abugida. It is derived from the Devanagari Ō, and ultimately the Brahmi letter.

=== Gujarati-using Languages ===
The Gujarati script is used to write the Gujarati and Kutchi languages. In both languages, ઓ is pronounced as [o]. Like all Indic scripts, Gujarati vowels come in two forms: an independent vowel form for syllables that begin with a vowel sound, and a vowel sign attached to base consonant to override the inherent /ə/ vowel.

=== Gujarati Candra O ===
Gujarati independent short O and short O vowel sign.

Candra O (ઑ, short O) is a vowel of the Gujarati abugida. It is derived from the Devanagari Candra O, and ultimately the Brahmi letter.

==== Gujarati-using Languages ====
The Gujarati script is used to write the Gujarati and Kutchi languages. In both languages, ઑ is pronounced as [o]. Like all Indic scripts, Gujarati vowels come in two forms: an independent vowel form for syllables that begin with a vowel sound, and a vowel sign attached to base consonant to override the inherent /ə/ vowel.

== Telugu O ==
Telugu independent vowel and vowel sign O.

O (ఒ) is a vowel of the Telugu abugida. It ultimately arose from the Brahmi letter. It is closely related to the Kannada letter ಒ. Like in other Indic scripts, Telugu vowels have two forms: and independent letter for word and syllable-initial vowel sounds, and a vowel sign for changing the inherent "a" of Telugu consonant letters. Vowel signs in Telugu can interact with a base consonant in one of three ways: 1) the vowel sign touches or sits adjacent to the base consonant without modifying the shape of either 2) the vowel sign sits directly above the consonant, replacing its v-shaped headline, 3) the vowel sign and consonant interact, forming a ligature. Unlike other vowels, the O vowel sign has an alternate form in some typefaces that is used for the Gho, Jho, Mo and Yo syllables.

Telugu Gho and Ghō, showing the alternate forms of the vowel marks.

Telugu O vowel sign on క, ఖ, గ, ఘ & ఙ: Ko, Kho, Go, Gho and Ngo. Note that how the vowel sign interacts with the base consonant is dependent on the location of the headline, the absence of a headline, and the presence of a tail to attach to.

=== Telugu Ō ===
Telugu independent vowel and vowel sign Ō.

In addition, Telugu also contains a second O vowel, Ō (ఓ). It is also descended from the Brahmi letter. It is closely related to the Kannada letter ಓ. The long Ō vowel sign generally interacts with a base consonant the same as short O, with an alternate vowel sign form in some typefaces for Ghō, Jhō, Mō and Yō.

Telugu Ō vowel sign on క, ఖ, గ, ఘ & ఙ: Kō, Khō, Gō, Ghō and Ngō. Note that how the vowel sign interacts with the base consonant is dependent on the location of the headline, the absence of a headline, and the presence of a tail to attach to.

== Malayalam O ==
Malayalam independent vowel and vowel sign O.

O (ഒ) is a vowel of the Malayalam abugida. It ultimately arose from the Brahmi letter, via the Grantha letter o. Like in other Indic scripts, Malayalam vowels have two forms: an independent letter for word and syllable-initial vowel sounds, and a vowel sign for changing the inherent "a" of consonant letters. Vowel signs in Malayalam usually sit adjacent to its base consonant - below, to the left, right, or both left and right, but are always pronounced after the consonant sound.

Malayalam independent vowel and vowel sign Ō.

=== Malayalam Ō ===
Ō (ഓ, Long O) is a vowel of the Malayalam abugida. It is a variation of the regular Malayalam short O vowel that appeared after Grantha. Like other Malayalam vowels, Ō has two forms: an independent letter for word and syllable-initial vowel sounds, and a vowel sign for changing the inherent "a" of consonant letters.

== Odia O ==
Odia independent and vowel sign O

O (ଓ) is a vowel of the Odia abugida. It ultimately arose from the Brahmi letter, via the Siddhaṃ letter o. Like in other Indic scripts, Odia vowels have two forms: an independent letter for word and syllable-initial vowel sounds, and a vowel sign for changing the inherent "a" of consonant letters. Vowel signs in Odia usually sit adjacent to its base consonant - below, to the left, right, or both left and right, but are always pronounced after the consonant sound. No base consonants are altered in form when adding a vowel sign, and there are no consonant+vowel ligatures in Odia.

== Kaithi O ==
Kaithi independent vowel and vowel sign O.

O (𑂋) is a vowel of the Kaithi abugida. It ultimately arose from the Brahmi letter, via the Siddhaṃ letter O. Like in other Indic scripts, Kaithi vowels have two forms: an independent letter for word and syllable-initial vowel sounds, and a vowel sign for changing the inherent "a" of consonant letters. Vowel signs in Kaithi usually sit adjacent to its base consonant - below, to the left, right, or both left and right, but are always pronounced after the consonant sound. No base consonants are altered in form when adding a vowel sign, and there are no consonant+vowel ligatures in Kaithi.

== Tirhuta O ==
Tirhuta independent vowel and vowel sign O.

O (𑒍) is a vowel of the Tirhuta abugida. It ultimately arose from the Brahmi letter, via the Siddhaṃ letter O. Like in other Indic scripts, Tirhuta vowels have two forms: an independent letter for word and syllable-initial vowel sounds, and a vowel sign for changing the inherent "a" of consonant letters. Vowel signs in Tirhuta usually sit adjacent to its base consonant - below, to the left, right, or both left and right, but are always pronounced after the consonant sound. No consonants are altered in form when adding the O vowel mark, although there are some consonant+vowel ligatures in Tirhuta.

== Comparison of O ==
The various Indic scripts are generally related to each other through adaptation and borrowing, and as such the glyphs for cognate letters, including O, are related as well.

Comparison of O in different scripts

Aramaic
Kharoṣṭhī 𐨆	Ashoka Brahmi / 𑁄	Kushana Brahmi (Note: The middle "Kushana" form of Brahmi is a later style that emerged as Brahmi scripts were beginning to proliferate. Gupta Brahmi was definitely a stylistic descendant from Kushana, but other Brahmi-derived scripts may have descended from earlier forms.) / 𑁄	Tocharian (Note: Tocharian is probably derived from the middle period "Kushana" form of Brahmi, although artifacts from that time are not plentiful enough to establish a definite succession.)
Gupta Brahmi / 𑁄	Pallava
Kadamba -
Bhaiksuki 𑰌 / 𑰺	Siddhaṃ / 𑖺	Grantha 𑌓 / 𑍋	Cham ꨅ / ꨯꨩ
Sinhala ඕ / ො	Pyu / Old Mon (Note: Pyu and Old Mon are probably the precursors of the Burmese script, and may be derived from either the Pallava or Kadamba script) -
Tibetan ཨོ	Newa 𑐌 / 𑑀	Ahom 𑜨	Malayalam ഓ / ോ
Telugu ఒ / ో	Burmese ဩ / ော
Lepcha ᰨ	Ranjana	Saurashtra ꢐ / ꣀ	Dives Akuru 𑤉 / 𑤸
Kannada ಓ / ೋ	Kayah Li ꤪ
Limbu ᤨ	Soyombo (Note: May also be derived from Devangari (see bottom left of table)) 𑩕	Khmer ឱ / ោ	Tamil / ோ
Chakma 𑄮	Tai Tham ᩒ / ᩰ
Meitei Mayek ꫡ / ꯣ	Gaudi -	Thai โ	Lao ໂ
Tai Le ᥩ
Marchen 𑲴	Tirhuta 𑒍 / 𑒼	New Tai Lue ᦷ	Tai Viet ꪶ	Aksara Kawi 𑼐 / 𑼾𑼴
'Phags-pa ꡡ	Odia ଓ / ୋ	Sharada 𑆏 / 𑆾	Rejang ꥋ	Batak ᯬ	Buginese ᨚ
Zanabazar Square 𑨆	Bengali–Assamese / ো	Takri 𑚈 / 𑚴	Javanese ꦎ / ꦺꦴ	Balinese ᬑ / ᭀ	Makasar 𑻶
Hangul (Note: The Origin of Hangul from 'Phags-pa is one of limited influence, inspiring at most a few basic letter shapes. Hangul does not function as an Indic abugida.) -	Northern Nagari -	Dogri 𑠈 / 𑠵	Laṇḍā -	Sundanese ᮇ / ᮧ	Baybayin ᜂ
Modi 𑘌 / 𑘻	Gujarati ઓ / ો	Khojki 𑈆 / 𑈲	Khudabadi 𑊸 / 𑋧	Mahajani 𑅔	Tagbanwa -
Devanagari / ो	Nandinagari 𑦬 / 𑧜	Kaithi / 𑂷	Gurmukhi ਓ / ੋ	Multani -	Buhid -
Canadian Syllabics (Note: Although the basic letter forms of the Canadian Aboriginal Syllabics were derived from handwritten Devanagari letters, this abugida indicates vowel sounds by rotations of the letter form, rather than the use of vowel diacritics as is standard in Indic abugidas.) -	Soyombo (Note: May also be derived from Ranjana (see above)) 𑩕	Sylheti Nagari ꠨	Gunjala Gondi 𑵪 / 𑶓	Masaram Gondi (Note: Masaram Gondi acts as an Indic abugida, but its letterforms were not derived from any single precursor script.) 𑴉 / 𑴽	Hanuno'o ᜢ

== Character encodings of O ==
Most Indic scripts are encoded in the Unicode Standard, and as such the letter O in those scripts can be represented in plain text with unique codepoint. O from several modern-use scripts can also be found in legacy encodings, such as ISCII.

Character information
Preview	ओ		ও		ஓ		ఓ		ଓ		ಓ		ഓ		ઓ		ਓ	
Unicode name	DEVANAGARI LETTER O		BENGALI LETTER O		TAMIL LETTER OO		TELUGU LETTER OO		ORIYA LETTER O		KANNADA LETTER OO		MALAYALAM LETTER OO		GUJARATI LETTER O		GURMUKHI LETTER OO	
Encodings	decimal	hex	dec	hex	dec	hex	dec	hex	dec	hex	dec	hex	dec	hex	dec	hex	dec	hex
Unicode	2323	U+0913	2451	U+0993	2963	U+0B93	3091	U+0C13	2835	U+0B13	3219	U+0C93	3347	U+0D13	2707	U+0A93	2579	U+0A13
UTF-8	224 164 147	E0 A4 93	224 166 147	E0 A6 93	224 174 147	E0 AE 93	224 176 147	E0 B0 93	224 172 147	E0 AC 93	224 178 147	E0 B2 93	224 180 147	E0 B4 93	224 170 147	E0 AA 93	224 168 147	E0 A8 93
Numeric character reference	&#2323;	&#x913;	&#2451;	&#x993;	&#2963;	&#xB93;	&#3091;	&#xC13;	&#2835;	&#xB13;	&#3219;	&#xC93;	&#3347;	&#xD13;	&#2707;	&#xA93;	&#2579;	&#xA13;
ISCII	176	B0	176	B0	176	B0	176	B0	176	B0	176	B0	176	B0	176	B0	176	B0

Character information
Preview	Ashoka Kushana Gupta				𑌓	
Unicode name	BRAHMI LETTER O		SIDDHAM LETTER O		GRANTHA LETTER OO	
Encodings	decimal	hex	dec	hex	dec	hex
Unicode	69649	U+11011	71052	U+1158C	70419	U+11313
UTF-8	240 145 128 145	F0 91 80 91	240 145 150 140	F0 91 96 8C	240 145 140 147	F0 91 8C 93
UTF-16	55300 56337	D804 DC11	55301 56716	D805 DD8C	55300 57107	D804 DF13
Numeric character reference	&#69649;	&#x11011;	&#71052;	&#x1158C;	&#70419;	&#x11313;

Character information
Preview	ꡡ		𑐌		𑰌		𑆏	
Unicode name	PHAGS-PA LETTER O		NEWA LETTER O		BHAIKSUKI LETTER O		SHARADA LETTER O	
Encodings	decimal	hex	dec	hex	dec	hex	dec	hex
Unicode	43105	U+A861	70668	U+1140C	72716	U+11C0C	70031	U+1118F
UTF-8	234 161 161	EA A1 A1	240 145 144 140	F0 91 90 8C	240 145 176 140	F0 91 B0 8C	240 145 134 143	F0 91 86 8F
UTF-16	43105	A861	55301 56332	D805 DC0C	55303 56332	D807 DC0C	55300 56719	D804 DD8F
Numeric character reference	&#43105;	&#xA861;	&#70668;	&#x1140C;	&#72716;	&#x11C0C;	&#70031;	&#x1118F;

Character information
Preview	ဩ		ᩒ		ᦷ	
Unicode name	MYANMAR LETTER O		TAI THAM LETTER OO		NEW TAI LUE VOWEL SIGN O	
Encodings	decimal	hex	dec	hex	dec	hex
Unicode	4137	U+1029	6738	U+1A52	6583	U+19B7
UTF-8	225 128 169	E1 80 A9	225 169 146	E1 A9 92	225 166 183	E1 A6 B7
Numeric character reference	&#4137;	&#x1029;	&#6738;	&#x1A52;	&#6583;	&#x19B7;

Character information
Preview	ឱ		ໂ		โ		ꪶ	
Unicode name	KHMER INDEPENDENT VOWEL QOO TYPE ONE		LAO VOWEL SIGN O		THAI CHARACTER SARA O		TAI VIET VOWEL O	
Encodings	decimal	hex	dec	hex	dec	hex	dec	hex
Unicode	6065	U+17B1	3778	U+0EC2	3650	U+0E42	43702	U+AAB6
UTF-8	225 158 177	E1 9E B1	224 187 130	E0 BB 82	224 185 130	E0 B9 82	234 170 182	EA AA B6
Numeric character reference	&#6065;	&#x17B1;	&#3778;	&#xEC2;	&#3650;	&#xE42;	&#43702;	&#xAAB6;

Character information
Preview	ඕ		ꤪ		ᥩ		𑤉		ꢐ		ꨅ	
Unicode name	SINHALA LETTER OOYANNA		KAYAH LI VOWEL O		TAI LE LETTER O		DIVES AKURU LETTER O		SAURASHTRA LETTER OO		CHAM LETTER O	
Encodings	decimal	hex	dec	hex	dec	hex	dec	hex	dec	hex	dec	hex
Unicode	3477	U+0D95	43306	U+A92A	6505	U+1969	71945	U+11909	43152	U+A890	43525	U+AA05
UTF-8	224 182 149	E0 B6 95	234 164 170	EA A4 AA	225 165 169	E1 A5 A9	240 145 164 137	F0 91 A4 89	234 162 144	EA A2 90	234 168 133	EA A8 85
UTF-16	3477	0D95	43306	A92A	6505	1969	55302 56585	D806 DD09	43152	A890	43525	AA05
Numeric character reference	&#3477;	&#xD95;	&#43306;	&#xA92A;	&#6505;	&#x1969;	&#71945;	&#x11909;	&#43152;	&#xA890;	&#43525;	&#xAA05;

Character information
Preview	𑘌		𑦬		ꠅ			
Unicode name	MODI LETTER O		NANDINAGARI LETTER O		SYLOTI NAGRI LETTER O		KAITHI LETTER O	
Encodings	decimal	hex	dec	hex	dec	hex	dec	hex
Unicode	71180	U+1160C	72108	U+119AC	43013	U+A805	69771	U+1108B
UTF-8	240 145 152 140	F0 91 98 8C	240 145 166 172	F0 91 A6 AC	234 160 133	EA A0 85	240 145 130 139	F0 91 82 8B
UTF-16	55301 56844	D805 DE0C	55302 56748	D806 DDAC	43013	A805	55300 56459	D804 DC8B
Numeric character reference	&#71180;	&#x1160C;	&#72108;	&#x119AC;	&#43013;	&#xA805;	&#69771;	&#x1108B;

Character information
Preview	𑒍		ꫡ	
Unicode name	TIRHUTA LETTER O		MEETEI MAYEK LETTER O	
Encodings	decimal	hex	dec	hex
Unicode	70797	U+1148D	43745	U+AAE1
UTF-8	240 145 146 141	F0 91 92 8D	234 171 161	EA AB A1
UTF-16	55301 56461	D805 DC8D	43745	AAE1
Numeric character reference	&#70797;	&#x1148D;	&#43745;	&#xAAE1;

Character information
Preview	𑚈		𑠈		𑈆		𑊸		𑅔	
Unicode name	TAKRI LETTER O		DOGRA LETTER O		KHOJKI LETTER O		KHUDAWADI LETTER O		MAHAJANI LETTER O	
Encodings	decimal	hex	dec	hex	dec	hex	dec	hex	dec	hex
Unicode	71304	U+11688	71688	U+11808	70150	U+11206	70328	U+112B8	69972	U+11154
UTF-8	240 145 154 136	F0 91 9A 88	240 145 160 136	F0 91 A0 88	240 145 136 134	F0 91 88 86	240 145 138 184	F0 91 8A B8	240 145 133 148	F0 91 85 94
UTF-16	55301 56968	D805 DE88	55302 56328	D806 DC08	55300 56838	D804 DE06	55300 57016	D804 DEB8	55300 56660	D804 DD54
Numeric character reference	&#71304;	&#x11688;	&#71688;	&#x11808;	&#70150;	&#x11206;	&#70328;	&#x112B8;	&#69972;	&#x11154;

Character information
Preview	ᬑ		ꦎ		ᮇ	
Unicode name	BALINESE LETTER OKARA		JAVANESE LETTER O		SUNDANESE LETTER O	
Encodings	decimal	hex	dec	hex	dec	hex
Unicode	6929	U+1B11	43406	U+A98E	7047	U+1B87
UTF-8	225 172 145	E1 AC 91	234 166 142	EA A6 8E	225 174 135	E1 AE 87
Numeric character reference	&#6929;	&#x1B11;	&#43406;	&#xA98E;	&#7047;	&#x1B87;

Character information
Preview	𑴉	
Unicode name	MASARAM GONDI LETTER O	
Encodings	decimal	hex
Unicode	72969	U+11D09
UTF-8	240 145 180 137	F0 91 B4 89
UTF-16	55303 56585	D807 DD09
Numeric character reference	&#72969;	&#x11D09;
