= Tirhuta script =

Script of the Maithili language

Tirhuta 𑒞𑒱𑒩𑒯𑒳𑒞𑒰 𑒧𑒱𑒟𑒱𑒪𑒰𑒏𑓂𑒭𑒩 (mithilākṣar)
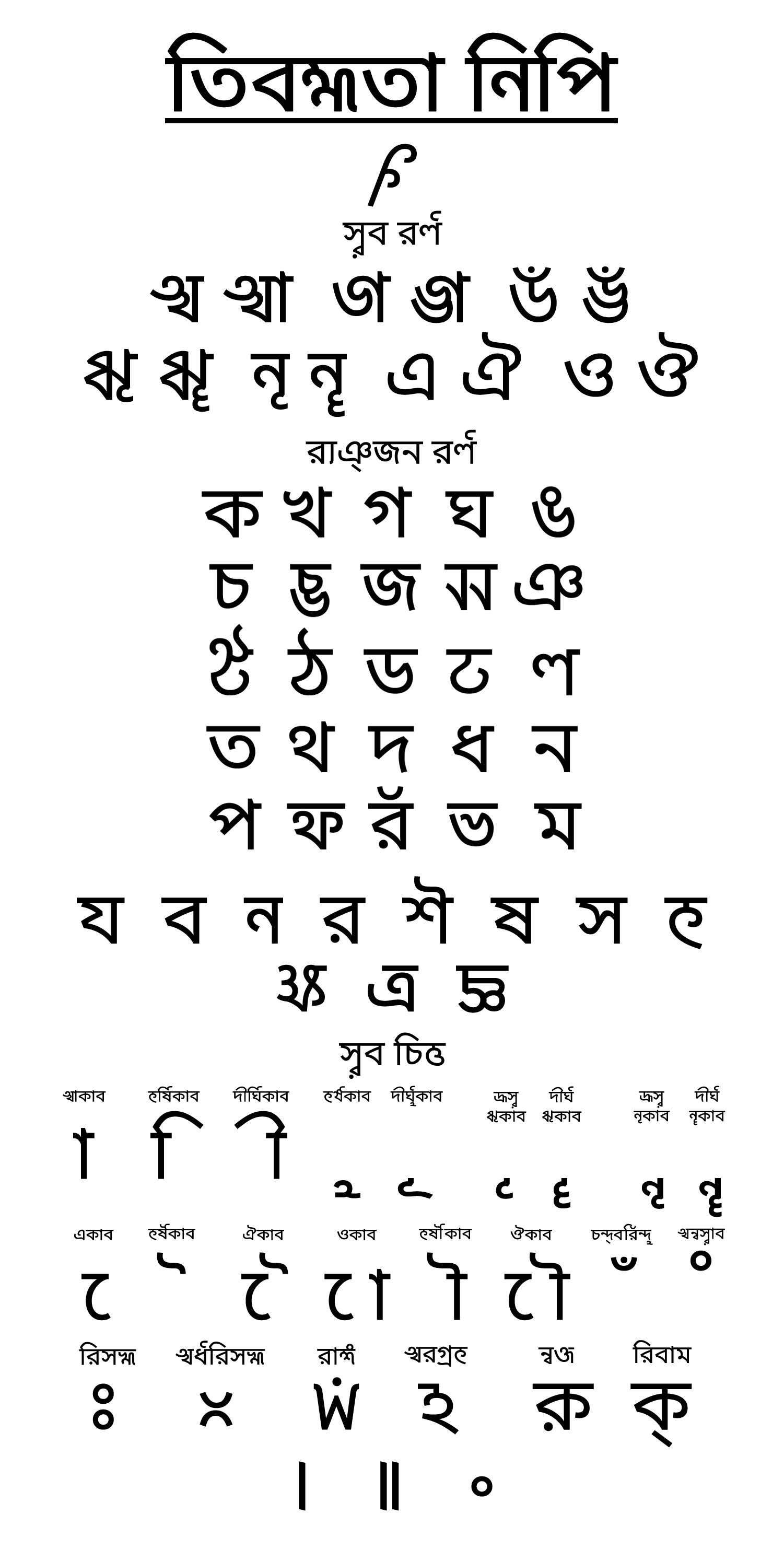
- Tirhuta Varnamala (Alphabet Chart) divided into 14 Vowels (𑒮𑓂𑒫𑒩 𑒫𑒩𑓂𑒝), 33 Basic consonants (𑒫𑓂𑒨𑒘𑓂𑒖𑒢 𑒫𑒩𑓂𑒝), 3 conjunct consonants, 17 vowel diacritics (𑒮𑓂𑒫𑒩 𑒔𑒱𑒯𑓂𑒢), 4 Vedic diacritics, 1 nuqta, 1 virama, 3 punctuation marks and an auspicious sign unique to Tirhuta written at the beginning.
- Script type: Abugida
- Period: c. 14th century–present day
- Direction: Left-to-right
- Region: Mithila
- Language: Maithili
- Languages: Maithili, Sanskrit

Related scripts
- Parent systems: Proto-Sinaitic script: Phoenician alphabet; Aramaic alphabet; Brāhmī; Gupta; Siddhaṃ; Gaudi; Tirhuta
- Sister systems: Bengali–Assamese, Assamese, Odia

ISO 15924
- ISO 15924: Tirh (326), Tirhuta

Unicode
- Unicode alias: Tirhuta
- Unicode range: U+11480–U+114DF; Final Accepted Script Proposal
- Also known as Vaidehi Lipi

The Tirhuta script (Maithili: 𑒞𑒱𑒩𑒯𑒳𑒞𑒰, romanized: tirahutā), also known as Mithilakshar (Maithili: 𑒧𑒱𑒟𑒱𑒪𑒰𑒏𑓂𑒭𑒩, romanized: mithilākṣar) or Maithili script, or Vaidehi script has historically been used for writing Maithili, an Indo-Aryan language spoken by almost 35 million people in the Mithila region. The Tirhuta script is closely related to the Bengali-Assamese script. Tirhuta, Bengali, Assamese, Newari, Meitei and Odia are part of the same family of scripts.

== History ==
The Lalitavistara, an ancient Buddhist text, mentions the Vaidehi script. A significant transformation occurred in the northeastern alphabet in the latter half of the 7th century AD. This evolution is first evident in the inscriptions of Adityasena. The eastern variant of this transformed script subsequently developed into the Maithili script, which gained prominence in regions like Assam, Bengal, and Nepal, and is also called the Gaudiya script.

Mithilakshar or Tirhuta is one of the scripts of the broader Eastern South Asia. It had come to its current shape by the 10th century AD. The oldest form of Mithilakshar is also found in the Sahodara stone inscriptions of 950 AD. The script has been used throughout Mithila from Champaran to Deoghar. A fragmentary inscription found in Simraungadh, the medieval capital of the Karnats of Mithila which dates back to the 12th century in Tirhuta script is also one of the oldest evidence of this script. The script became distinguished from the Bengali, Oriya and Newari scripts by the 14th century. Evidenced by inscriptions, the early Maithili and Oriya scripts were very similar up until the 15th century.

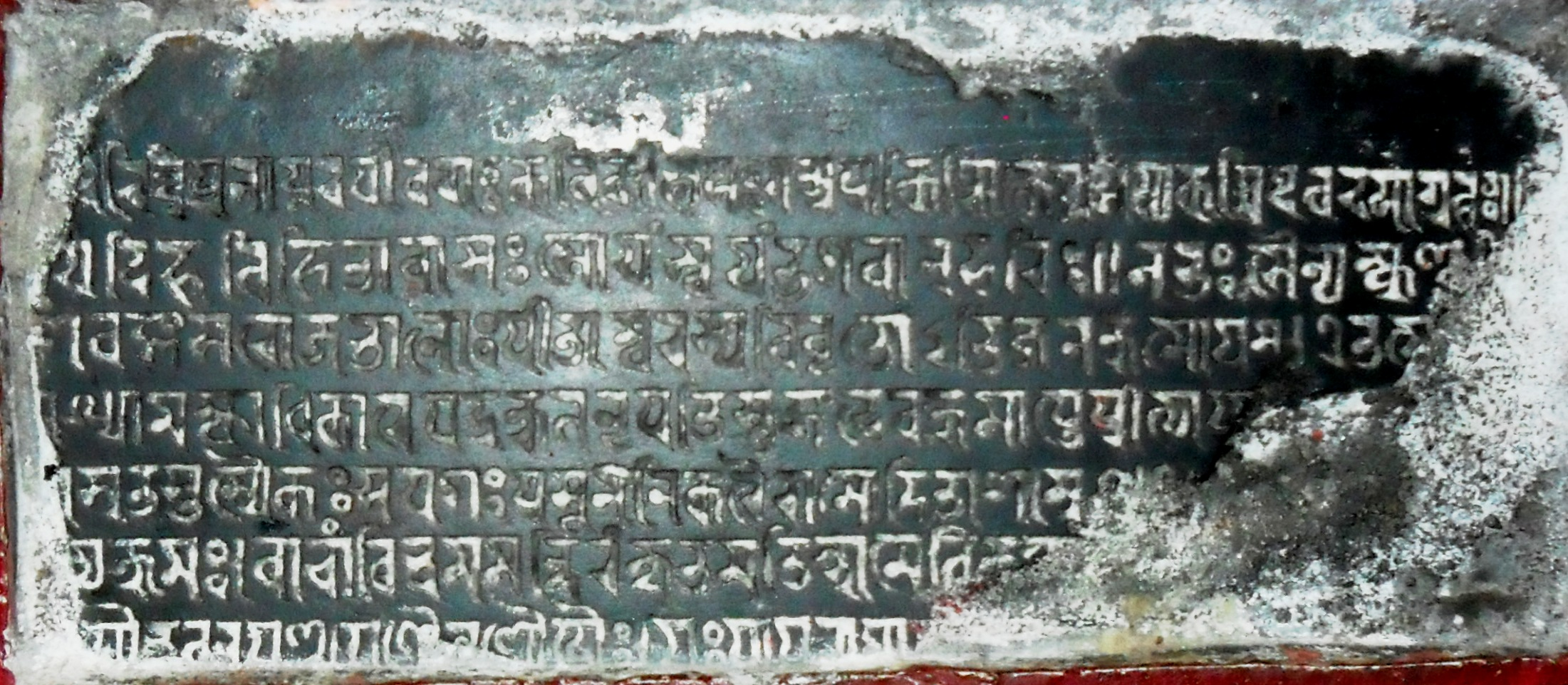
Sahodara Inscription in Maithili script of 950 AD, Sahodara temple in West Champaran Bihar

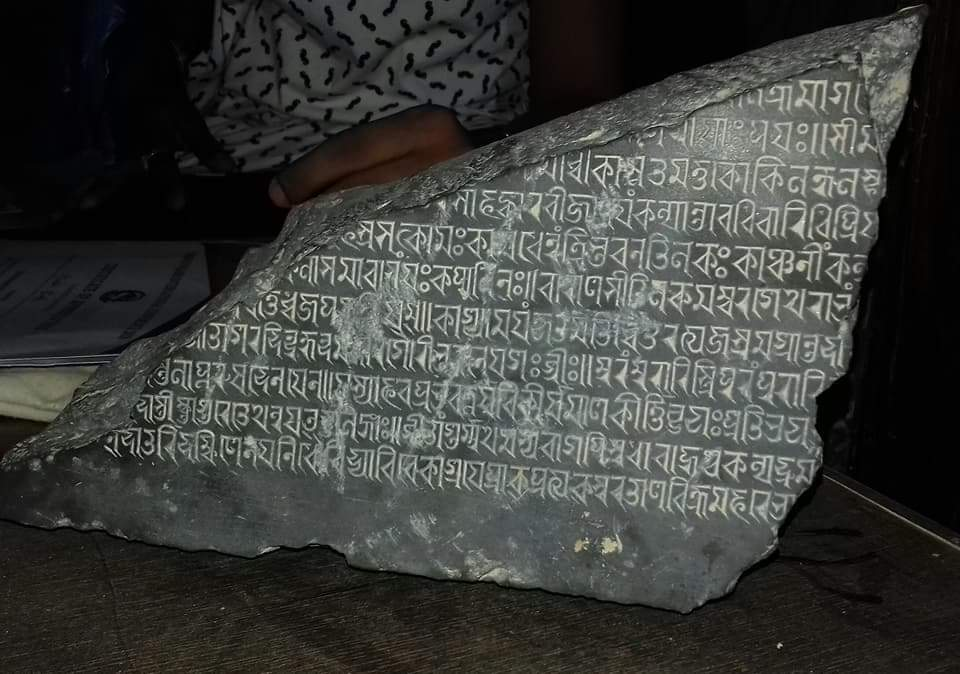
12th Century Stone inscription from Simroungarh showing early Tirhuta writing

== Current status ==
The use of this script has been declining in the last 100 years, which is the primary reason for the Mithila culture's decline. Despite its constitutional status, the development of the Maithili language is hindered by the lack of a widely used script.

Nowadays, the Maithili language is written almost exclusively in the Devanagari script, although Tirhuta is still sometimes used by religious Pundits and some culture-conscious families for writing ceremonial letters (pātā), documents & cultural affair, and efforts are underway to broaden the scope of its usage.

In the early 20th century some Sanskrit works were printed in this script through lithographic process. Later on Pusk Bhandar, Laheriasarai managed to forge a set of types and published a few works in Tirhuta, but could not go ahead. In the middle of the last century, All India Maithili Conference came with a new set of types and used it in the prestigious publication of Brihat Maithili Shabdakosha.

The official recognition of Maithili as one of the 14 provincial official languages of Nepal and its inclusion in the Eighth Schedule to the Constitution of India in 2003 have established it as a language with an independent identity. However, currently Maithili in the Devanagari script is officially recognised.

In the year 2013, a campaign called Mithilakshar Saksharta Abhiyan, for the literacy of the script among the common people in the Mithila region, was started. In June 2014, the Tirhuta script was added to the Unicode Standard from version 7.0. Although there is limited electronic font support, digitalisation efforts have started.

== Letters ==
=== Consonants ===
Most of the consonant letters are effectively identical to Bengali–Assamese, with the exception of 7 of the 33 letters: ⟨jh, ṭ, ḍh, ṇ, l, ś, h⟩, marked in blue text color. The consonants, along with their IAST and IPA transcriptions, are provided below.

𑒏 ka IPA: /kə/	𑒐 kha IPA: /kʰə/	𑒑 ga IPA: /gə/	𑒒 gha IPA: /gʱə/	𑒓 ṅa IPA: /ŋə/
𑒔 ca IPA: /t͡ʃə/	𑒕 cha IPA: /t͡ʃʰə/	𑒖 ja IPA: /d͡ʒə/	𑒗 jha IPA: /d͡ʒʱə/	𑒘 ña IPA: /ɲə/
𑒙 ṭa IPA: /ʈə/	𑒚 ṭha IPA: /ʈʰə/	𑒛 ḍa IPA: /ɖə/	𑒜 ḍha IPA: /ɖʱə/	𑒝 ṇa IPA: /ɳə/
𑒞 ta IPA: /t̪ə/	𑒟 tha IPA: /t̪ʰə/	𑒠 da IPA: /d̪ə/	𑒡 dha IPA: /d̪ʱə/	𑒢 na IPA: /nə/
𑒣 pa IPA: /pə/	𑒤 pha IPA: /pʰə/	𑒥 ba IPA: /bə/	𑒦 bha IPA: /bʱə/	𑒧 ma IPA: /mə/
𑒨 ya IPA: /jə/	𑒩 ra IPA: /rə/	𑒪 la IPA: /lə/	𑒫 va IPA: /ʋə/	𑒬 śa IPA: /ʃə/
𑒭 ṣa IPA: /ʂə/	𑒮 sa IPA: /sə/	𑒯 ha IPA: /ɦə/		

=== Vowels ===
𑒁 a IPA: /а/	——
𑒂 ā IPA: /аː/	𑒰
𑒃 i IPA: /і/	𑒱
𑒄 ī IPA: /іː/	𑒲
𑒅 u IPA: /u/	𑒳
𑒆 ū IPA: /uː/	𑒴
𑒇 ṛ IPA: /r̩/	𑒵
𑒈 ṝ IPA: /r̩ː/	𑒶
𑒉 ḷ IPA: /l̩/	𑒷
𑒊 ḹ IPA: /l̩ː/	𑒸
𑒋 ē IPA: /еː/	𑒹
—— e IPA: /е/	𑒺
𑒌 ai IPA: /аі/	𑒻
𑒍 ō IPA: /оː/	𑒼
—— o IPA: /о/	𑒽
𑒎 au IPA: /аu/	𑒾

=== Other signs ===
Symbol	Name	Notes
𑒿	chandrabindu	marks the nasalisation of a vowel
𑓀	anusvara	marks nasalisation
𑓁	visarga	marks the sound [h], which is an allophone of [r] and [s] in pausa (at the end of an utterance)
𑓂	virama	used to suppress the inherent vowel
𑓃	nukta	used to create new consonant signs
𑓄	avagraha	used to indicate prodelision of an [a]
𑓅	gvang	used to mark nasalisation
𑓇	Om	Om sign

== Numerals ==
Tirhuta script uses its own signs for the positional decimal numeral system.

Digits
0 𑓐	1 𑓑	2 𑓒	3 𑓓	4 𑓔	5 𑓕	6 𑓖	7 𑓗	8 𑓘	9 𑓙

== Image Gallery ==
Visual representation of the Maithili script, from its early inscriptions to contemporary handwriting.

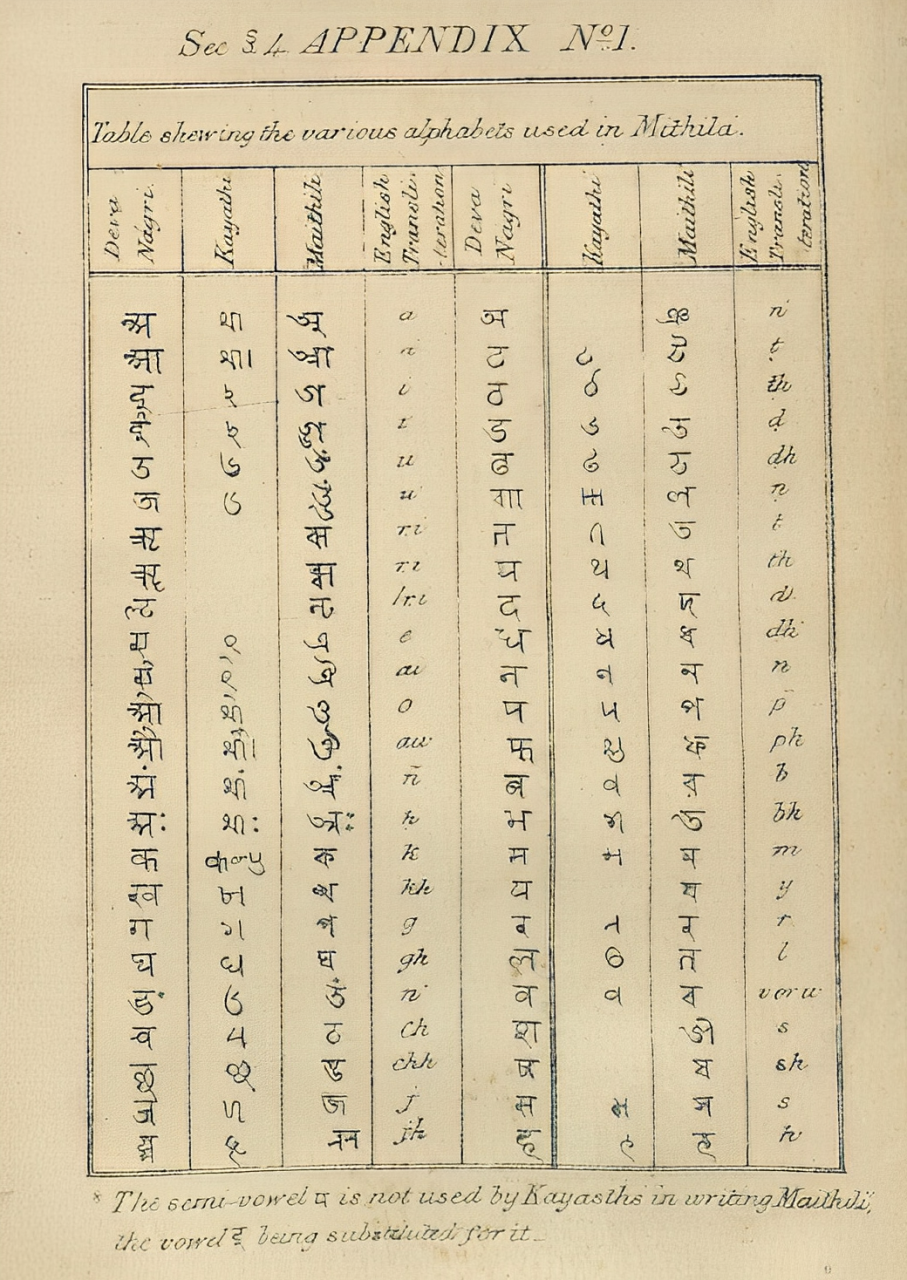
Table showing various alphabets used in Mithila

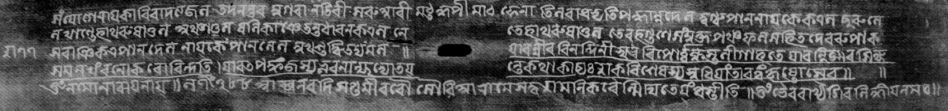
Varṇa Ratnākara manuscript in Maithili script

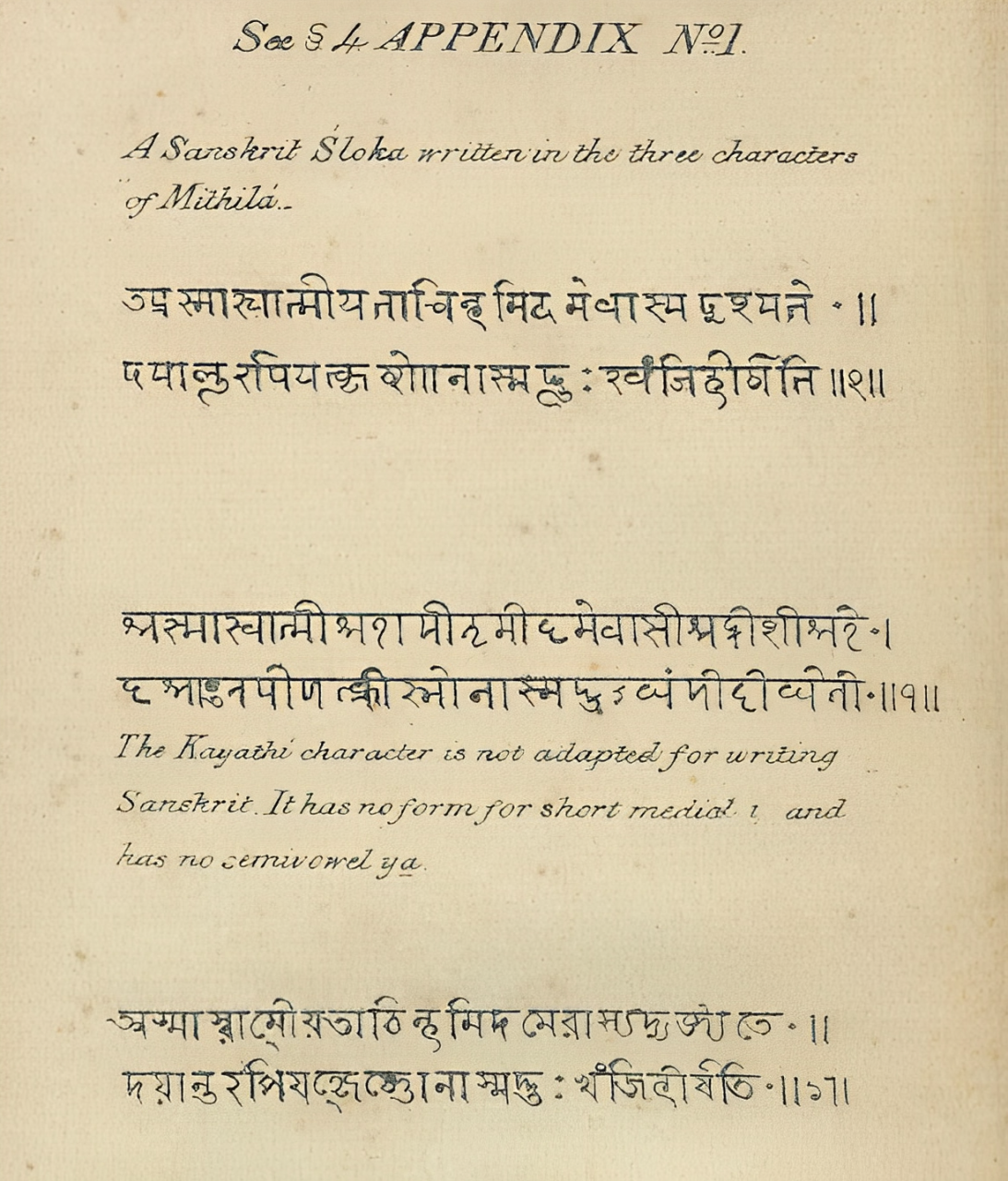
A Sanskrit Shloka written in three characters of Mithila

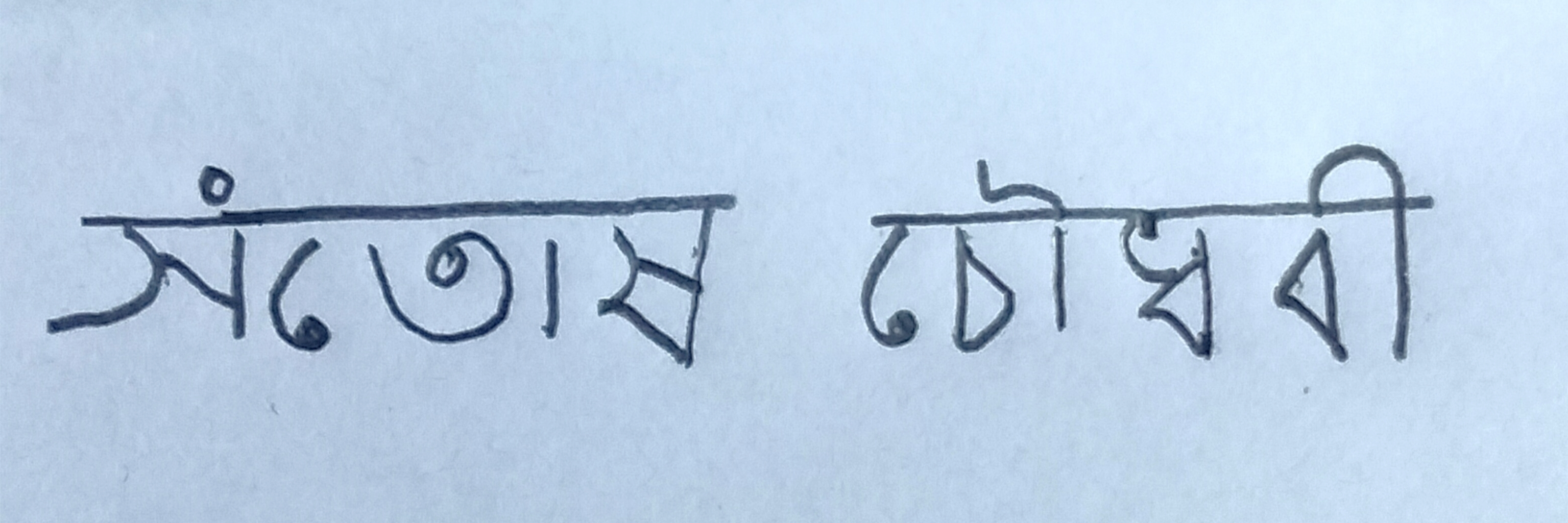
Hand written Mithilakshara scripts

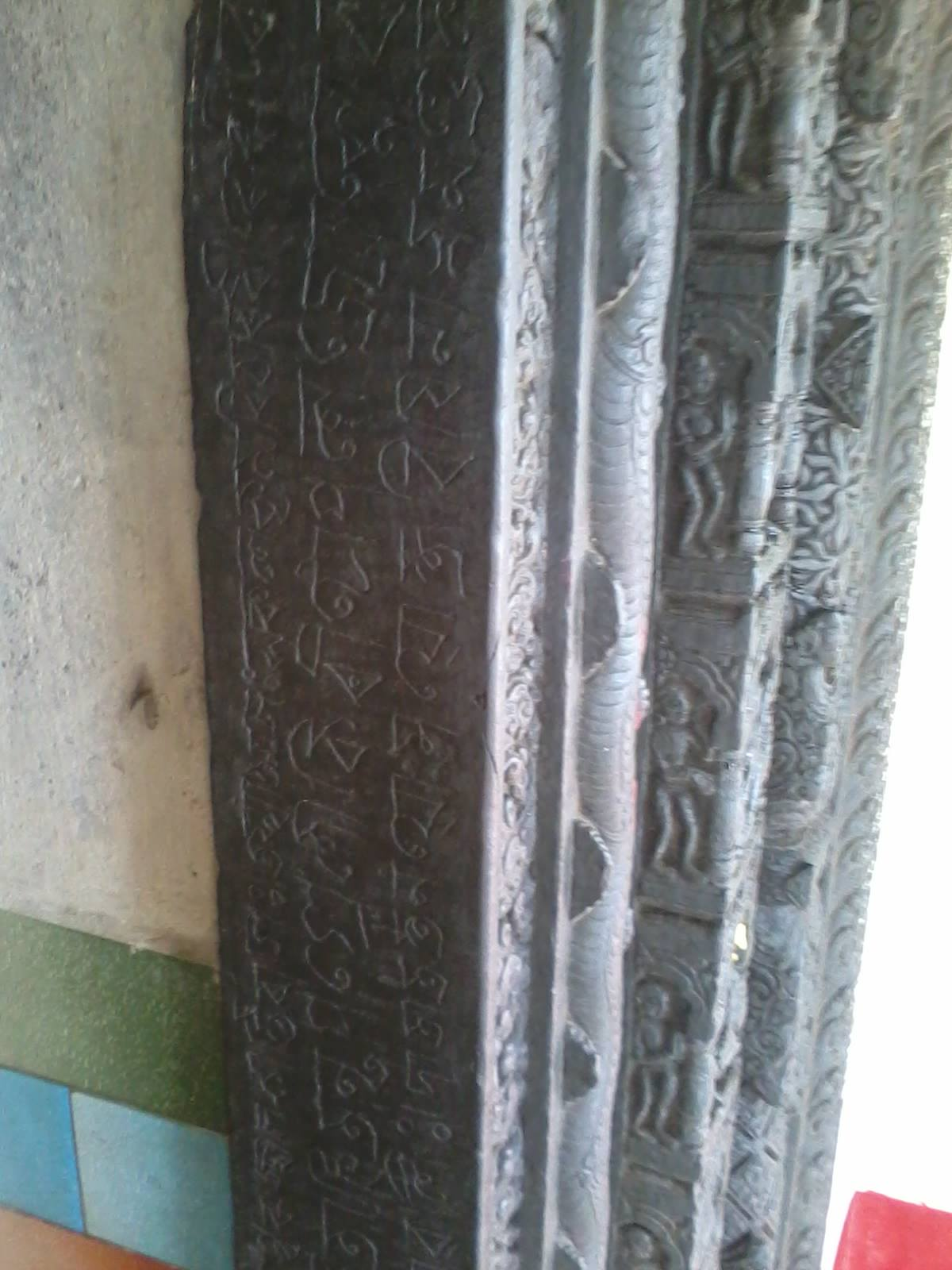
Inscription of King Narasimha of the Oinwar dynasty in the Tirhuta script at the Kandaha Sun Temple in the Kandaha village of Saharsa district, (c. 1435 A.D.)

== Unicode ==
Tirhuta script was added to the Unicode Standard in June 2014 with the release of version 7.0.

The Unicode block for Tirhuta is U+11480–U+114DF:

Tirhuta^{[1]}^{[2]} Official Unicode Consortium code chart (PDF)
	0	1	2	3	4	5	6	7	8	9	A	B	C	D	E	F
U+1148x	𑒀	𑒁	𑒂	𑒃	𑒄	𑒅	𑒆	𑒇	𑒈	𑒉	𑒊	𑒋	𑒌	𑒍	𑒎	𑒏
U+1149x	𑒐	𑒑	𑒒	𑒓	𑒔	𑒕	𑒖	𑒗	𑒘	𑒙	𑒚	𑒛	𑒜	𑒝	𑒞	𑒟
U+114Ax	𑒠	𑒡	𑒢	𑒣	𑒤	𑒥	𑒦	𑒧	𑒨	𑒩	𑒪	𑒫	𑒬	𑒭	𑒮	𑒯
U+114Bx	𑒰	𑒱	𑒲	𑒳	𑒴	𑒵	𑒶	𑒷	𑒸	𑒹	𑒺	𑒻	𑒼	𑒽	𑒾	𑒿
U+114Cx	𑓀	𑓁	𑓂	𑓃	𑓄	𑓅	𑓆	𑓇								
U+114Dx	𑓐	𑓑	𑓒	𑓓	𑓔	𑓕	𑓖	𑓗	𑓘	𑓙						
Notes 1.As of Unicode version 18.0 2.Grey areas indicate non-assigned code points
