= Mithilakshar Saksharta Abhiyan =

Mithilakshar literacy campaign

- Years active: 2013
- Country: India and Nepal
- Major figures: Pandit Ajay Nath Jha Shastri
- Influences: Mithilakshar script awareness
- Influenced: Maithil community

Mithilakshar Saksharta Abhiyan (Maithili: मिथिलाक्षर साक्षरता अभियान) lit. 'Mithilaakshar Literacy Campaign' refers to the initiative for preservation and promotion of the Mithilakshar script in Mithila region of the Indian subcontinent. It is a literacy campaign that focuses on the learning of the Mithilakshar script and its promotion. The initiative of the Mithilaakshar Saksharta Abhiyan, has initiated awareness regarding the heritage script of the Mithilakshar, among the common Maithil people in the region. It was founded by Pandit Ajay Nath Jha Shastri.

== Background ==
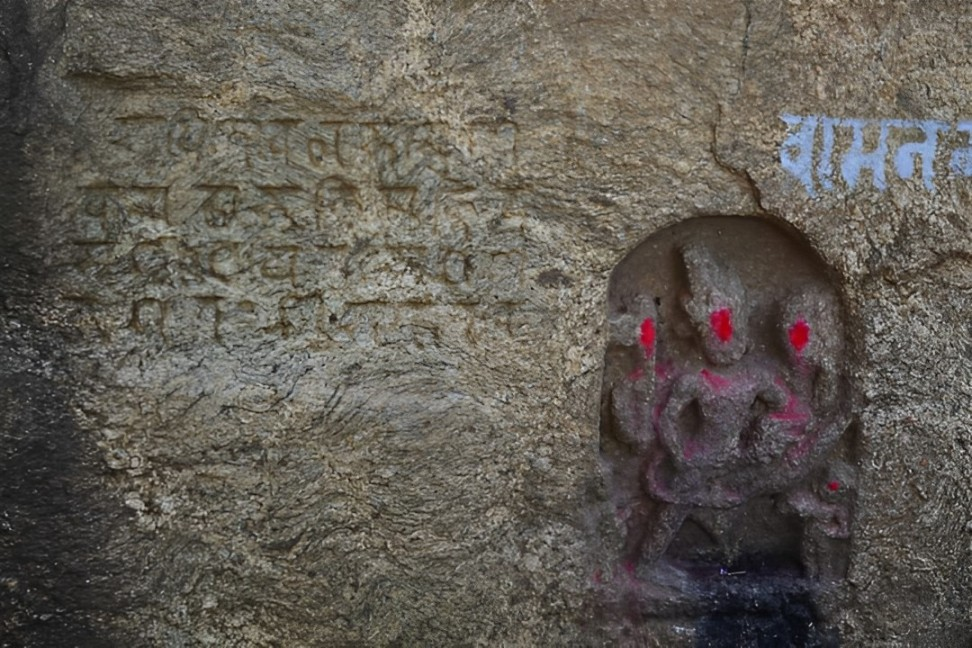
The earliest recorded epigraphic evidence of the Mithilakshar Lipi (also called Tirhuta script) was found in the Mandar Hill Stone inscriptions of Adityasena in the 7th century A.D. It presently fixed in the Baidyanath Dham temple of Deoghar in the state of Jharkhand in India.

The Mithilakshar refers to the original scripts of the Maithili language or literature. It is also known as Tirhuta scripts. It was in use till the end of the 19th century in the region. According to Kamal Kant Jha, earlier there used to be a printing press of Mithilakshar script in Darbhanga, where the works of several writers were printed. During the period of independence, people in region started writing their works in Devanagari script and the use of indigenous scripts Mithilakshar declined gradually.

Later in the year 2003, the Government of India added Maithili language to the Eighth Schedule of the Indian Constitution. The government at the time of recognition, bypassed the indigenous Mithilakshar script and recognized Devanagari as the script of the Maithili language. Unfortunately, this act of adopting Devanagari as the script of the Maithili language, led the indigenous Mithilakshar script to the situation of endangered state.

According to a campaigner Malaynath Mandan, hundreds of manuscripts and inscriptions are rotting in hundreds of houses across the Mithila region. These manuscripts and inscriptions yearn to be discovered by experts of Mithilakshar script. In the present times, a very few experts of the Mithilakshar script are survived in the region to yearn the information written in these manuscripts and inscriptions. The campaigners say that the revival of the Mithilakshar script is very necessary, so that the information coded in these manuscripts and inscriptions be decoded to understand these. These manuscripts and inscriptions may contains the information of the history, culture and civilization of the region. According to the prominent campaigner cum political leader Sanjay Kumar Jha, the Mithilakshar script is strongly recorded in many inscriptions and manuscripts of the 10th century and thereafter. He emphasized that the Mithila's heritage script, Mithilaakshar, has existed for several centuries around thousand years. Although its condition was somewhat dismal for a brief period in between. The Mithilakshar Saksharta Abhiyan was started to revive the use of the declined heritage script Mithilakshar of the region.

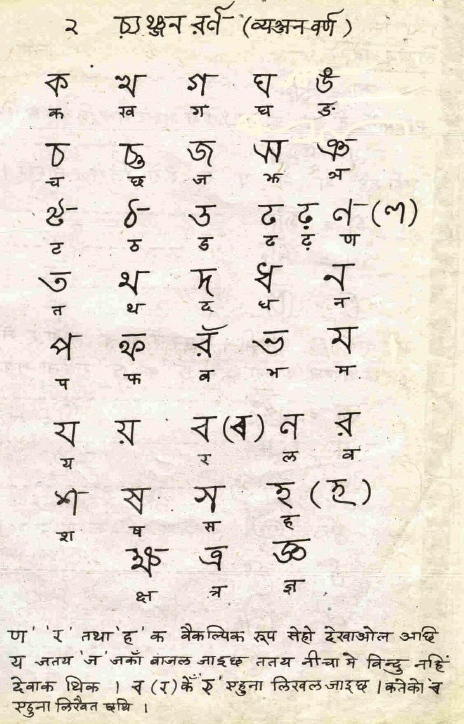
The consonants of the Tirhuta script and the corresponding Devnagari script letter.

According to Pandit Ajay Nath Jha Shastri, he was inspired to save the endangered Tirhuta script of Mithila from the Panjis written in the Mithilakshar script at his native village Saurath. The writings of the Panjis records were unreadable for common people. After that he decided to revive the heritage script Mithilakshar of Mithila, so that common people can understand and read the writings in the Mithilakshar script.

== History ==
The Mithilakshar Saksharta Abhiyan was started in the year 2013. It was started by Pandit Ajay Nath Jha Shastri, a resident of Saurath village in the Madhubani district of the Mithila region, with the aim of preserving and promoting Mithila's endangered heritage script, Mithilaakshar. Onwards the year 2013, every year on the 9th October, the foundation day of the Mithilakshar Saksharta Abhiyan is celebrated among the Maithil community in the region.

Due to the campaign of the Mithilakshar Saksharta Abhiyan, the number of people learning their mother tongue's scripts has increased significantly in the recent years. On 9 October 2022, the then state minister Sanjay Kumar Jha urged the people of Mithila to write their own name in the Mithilakshar script.

"Let us all take a pledge to at least write our names in Mithilakshar script."

— Sanjay Kumar Jha, Speech at the 9th Foundation Day, Mithilakshar Saksharta Abhiyan

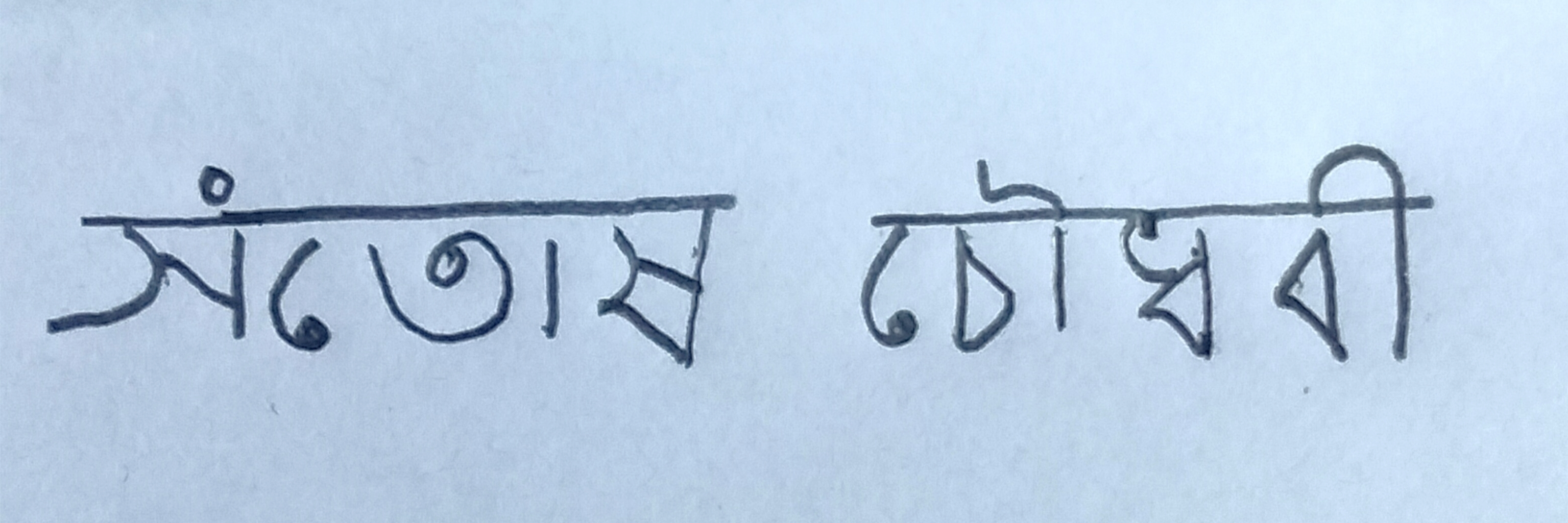
Example of a hand written name using the Mithilakshar scripts.

== Missions ==
The major mission of the Mithilakshar Saksharta Abhiyan is to revive the use of the heritage script Mithilakshar among the common people of the Mithila region. The campaigners of the initiative, organise workshops and training sessions through mass campaigns, social media and online platforms, etc for learning the original scripts of Mithilakshar.

Every year a convocation is organised by the Mithilaakshar Saksharta Abhiyan cum Punarjagran Shikshan-Prashikshan Sansthan, in which certificate of efficiency called Mithilakshar Praveen and marksheet of the scorecard are awarded to the expeditionary candidates for learning the Mithilakshar scripts. In the year 2026, it was 13th convocation. The institute has trained about one lakh people across the country in the Mithilakshar script.
