= Ancient Kamarupi script =

Ancient Assamese script

Ancient Kamarupi script Ancient Kamrupi script
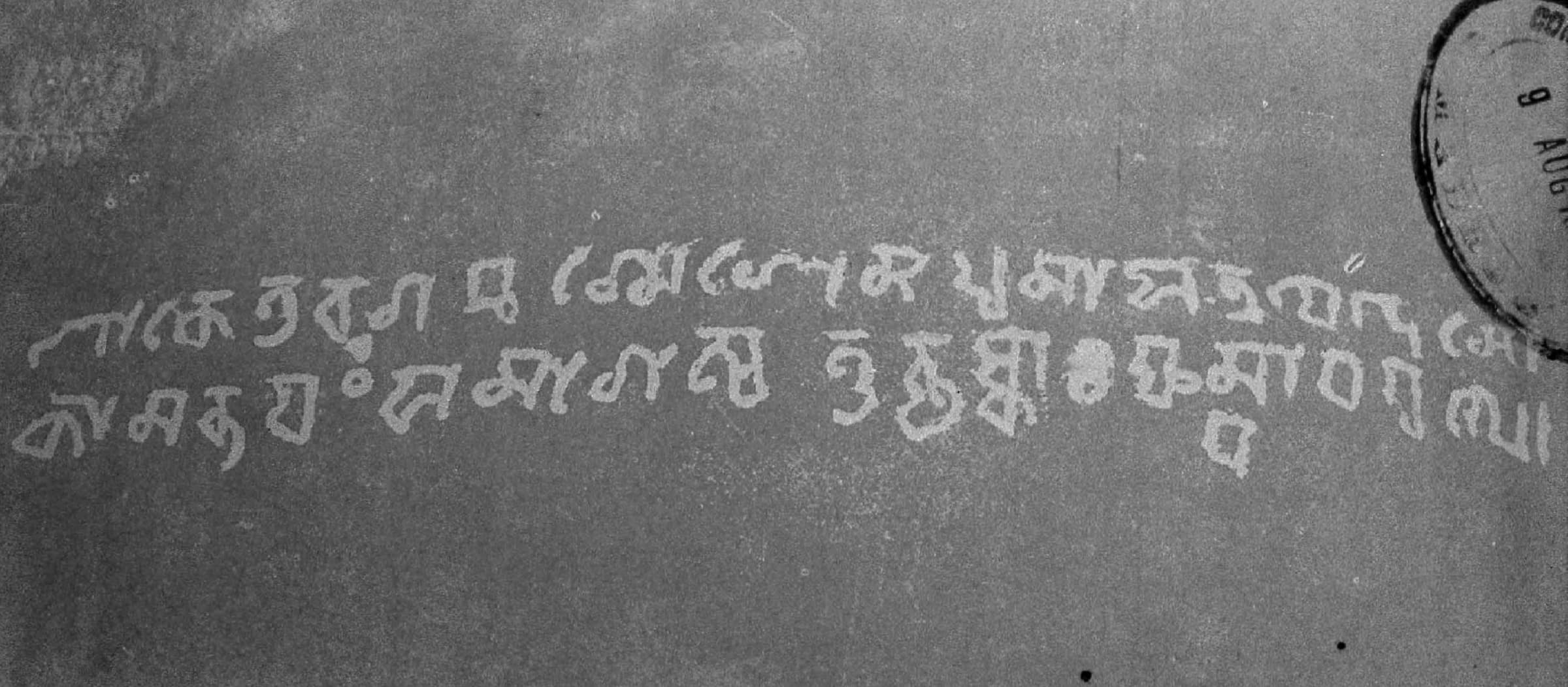
- Script type: Abugida
- Period: 5th-12th century
- Languages: Sanskrit & Kamarupi Prakrit

Related scripts
- Parent systems: Proto-Sinaitic alphabet: Phoenician alphabet; Aramaic alphabet; Brāhmī; Gupta; Ancient Kamarupi script
- Child systems: Assamese script

Ancient Kamarupi script (ancient Kamrupi script, ancient Assamese script) was the script used in ancient Kamarupa from as early as 5th century to 12th century, from which the Proto-Assamese script and then the Assamese script eventually evolved. In the development of the Assamese script, this phase was followed by the medieval and then by the modern Assamese scripts.

Though the script development was in general agreement with the development in Bengal and Bihar, it had local peculiarities. The angular and calligraphic style of writing prevalent to its west is not found in this development.

== History ==
The Kamarupi script originated from Gupta script, which in turn developed from Brahmi script. It developed on its own in Kamarupa, till the Nidhanpur copper-plate issued by Bhaskarvarman from his military camp at Karnasubarna, which took on Kutila characteristics. Sometimes, Kamarupi script origins are traced to Kutila script, which is not widely accepted.

The Kamarupa inscriptions were engraved during this development period, and they display the development of this script in this period. The scripts of the 5th-century Umachal and Nagajari-Khanikargaon rock inscriptions are nearly identical to the eastern variety of the Gupta script, which over the centuries evolved into the proto-Assamese script of the 12th-century Kanai-Boroxiboa inscriptions.

S. N. Sarma has observed that the Assamese script pertaining to the period from the 6th century to the twelfth century can be termed as the ancient Kamrupi script. The Kamrupi script took the form of the old Assamese script in the latter period.

== Descendants ==
In late medieval period, three variations came to be used, Gargaya used around Gargaon, Bamonia, used by Brahmins in preparation of Sanskrit texts and Kaitheli used by the Kayasthas and called Lakhri in Kamrup.

== See also ==
- Kamarupi Prakrit

== Bibliography ==
- Bhattacharya, Sureshchandra (1969). The Evolution of Script in Northeastern India from CAD 400 to 1200 with Special Reference to Bengal (PhD). University of London.
- Bora, Mahendra (1981). The Evolution of Assamese Script. Jorhat, Assam: Assam Sahitya Sabha.
- Goswami, Upendranath (1983). "The Assamese Script". Journal of the Assam Research Society. 27. Kamarupa Anusandhan Samiti.
- Lahiri, Nayanjot (1991). Pre-Ahom Assam: Studies in the Inscriptions of Assam between the Fifth and the Thirteenth Centuries AD. Delhi: Munshiram Manoharlal Publishers Pvt Ltd.
- Salomon, Richard (1998). Indian Epigraphy: A Guide to the Study of Inscriptions in Sanskrit, Prakrit, and the Other Indo-Aryan Languages. New York: Oxford University Press. ISBN 978-0-19-535666-3.
- Verma, Thakur Prasad (1976). Development of Script in Ancient Kamrupa. Asam Sahitya Sabha.
