= Tirhuta (Unicode block) =

- Range: U+11480..U+114DF (96 code points)
- Plane: SMP
- Scripts: Tirhuta
- Major alphabets: Maithili
- Assigned: 82 code points
- Unused: 14 reserved code points

Unicode version history
- 7.0 (2014): 82 (+82)

Unicode documentation
- Code chart ∣ Web page

Tirhuta is a Unicode block containing characters for Brahmi-derived Tirhuta script which was the primary writing system for Maithili in Bihar, India and Madhesh, Nepal until the 20th century.

== Block ==
Tirhuta^{[1]}^{[2]} Official Unicode Consortium code chart (PDF)
	0	1	2	3	4	5	6	7	8	9	A	B	C	D	E	F
U+1148x	𑒀	𑒁	𑒂	𑒃	𑒄	𑒅	𑒆	𑒇	𑒈	𑒉	𑒊	𑒋	𑒌	𑒍	𑒎	𑒏
U+1149x	𑒐	𑒑	𑒒	𑒓	𑒔	𑒕	𑒖	𑒗	𑒘	𑒙	𑒚	𑒛	𑒜	𑒝	𑒞	𑒟
U+114Ax	𑒠	𑒡	𑒢	𑒣	𑒤	𑒥	𑒦	𑒧	𑒨	𑒩	𑒪	𑒫	𑒬	𑒭	𑒮	𑒯
U+114Bx	𑒰	𑒱	𑒲	𑒳	𑒴	𑒵	𑒶	𑒷	𑒸	𑒹	𑒺	𑒻	𑒼	𑒽	𑒾	𑒿
U+114Cx	𑓀	𑓁	𑓂	𑓃	𑓄	𑓅	𑓆	𑓇								
U+114Dx	𑓐	𑓑	𑓒	𑓓	𑓔	𑓕	𑓖	𑓗	𑓘	𑓙						
Notes: 1. As of Unicode version 16.0; 2. Grey areas indicate non-assigned code points

== History ==
The following Unicode-related documents record the purpose and process of defining specific characters in the Tirhuta block:

Version	Final code points (Note: Proposed code points and characters names may differ from final code points and names)	Count	L2 ID	WG2 ID	Document
7.0	U+11480..114C7, 114D0..114D9	82	L2/06-226		Pandey, Anshuman (2006-06-21), Request to Allocate the Maithili Script in the Unicode Roadmap
7.0	U+11480..114C7, 114D0..114D9	82	L2/09-329	N3765	Pandey, Anshuman (2009-09-30), Towards an Encoding for the Maithili Script in ISO/IEC 10646
7.0	U+11480..114C7, 114D0..114D9	82	L2/11-175R	N4035	Pandey, Anshuman (2011-05-05), Proposal to Encode the Tirhuta Script in ISO/IEC 10646
7.0	U+11480..114C7, 114D0..114D9	82	L2/11-116		Moore, Lisa (2011-05-17), "D.9", UTC #127 / L2 #224 Minutes
7.0	U+11480..114C7, 114D0..114D9	82	L2/11-261R2		Moore, Lisa (2011-08-16), "Consensus 128-C35", UTC #128 / L2 #225 Minutes
7.0	U+11480..114C7, 114D0..114D9	82		N4103	"11.1.1 Tirhuta Script (was Maithili)", Unconfirmed minutes of WG 2 meeting 58, 2012-01-03
