= Kandaha Surya Mandir =

Temple of Lord Suryanarayana in Mithila

- कन्दाहा सूर्य मंदिर

Religion
- Affiliation: Hinduism
- District: Saharsa district
- Deity: Lord Suryanarayana
- Festival: Chhath Puja
- Governing body: Archaeological Survey of India, Bihar State Religious Trust Council
- Status: Preserved

Location
- Location: Kandaha village, Mahishi block, Mithila region
- State: Bihar
- Country: India

Architecture
- Founder: Sambhya, the son of Lord Krishna
- Designated as NHL: Markandeyark Surya Mandir
- Lord Surya Mandir in Mithila associated with the epic Mahabharata

Kandaha Surya Mandir (Maithili: कन्दाहा सूर्य मंदिर) is an ancient temple dedicated to Lord Suryanarayana in the Mithila region of Bihar. According to Hindu adherents, the temple is believed to be existing from the period of Mahabharata. It is located at Kandaha village in the Mahishi block of the Saharsa district in Bihar, India. It is said that in the ancient time the temple was constructed by Sambhya, the son of Lord Krishna. It is one of twelve temples dedicated to Lord Suryanarayana in the country. It is also known as Markandeyark Surya Mandir.

== Description ==
According to legends, the description of the temple could be traced from the Hindu texts Surya Purana and Mahabharata. It is also known as Bhavaditya but its mythical name is Markandeyark. The temple has an idol of the Sun with Aries, the distinctive sign of the zodiac. In the temple, there is an idol of eight-armed Lord Ganesha.

The temple is built on a high land at Kandaha village. In the temple, there is an idol of the Lord Suryanarayana carved on a black stone. The idol is depicting Lord Suryanarayana riding on a chariot of seven horses. According to legends, it is believed that when the sun enters Mesha Rashi (Aries) in the Hindu month of Baisakh, the first ray of the sun falls on the black stone's sun statue and its chariot.

In the temple, apart from the Lord Suryanarayana statue there is a stunning statue of Lord Shiva. Similarly there are also statues of the two wives Sanjna and Chhaya of Lord Suryanarayana. In the campus of the temple, there is a sacred well. According to legends, it is believed that bathing from the sacred well's water is very beneficial for leprosy patients.

== Legendary story ==
According to Puranic texts, once Samba, the son of Lord Krishna was cursed by the celestial sage Devashree Narada. Then Samba established 12 Sun temples in different parts of the Aryavarta region during the period of 12 signs of the constellations to get rid from the curse given by Devashree Narada Muni. The Kandaha Surya Mandir is one of those 12 Sun temples and also called as Markandeyark Surya Mandir.

== History ==
The original ancient temple might had been destroyed over a long time period. The temple was rebuilt by the kings of Pala Dynasty.

Similarly in a copper plate inscription, it is stated that the temple was built in 1357 by a Brahmin named Vanshadhara on the orders of King Narsimha Deva of the Oiniwar Dynasty.

According to the priest Babu Kant Jha of the temple, it was built and destroyed many times but in 1334, the temple was renovated by the King Bhavadevasimha of the Oiniwar Dynasty. It is said that later the temple was again damaged by a brutal Mughal emperor called as Kalapahad. Then, it was renovated by a ascetic poet named Laxminath Gosai. In the campus of the temple, several rare statues of gods and goddesses were found from time to time. In 1985, the temple was taken under the protection of the Archaeological Survey of India due to its archaeological significance.
