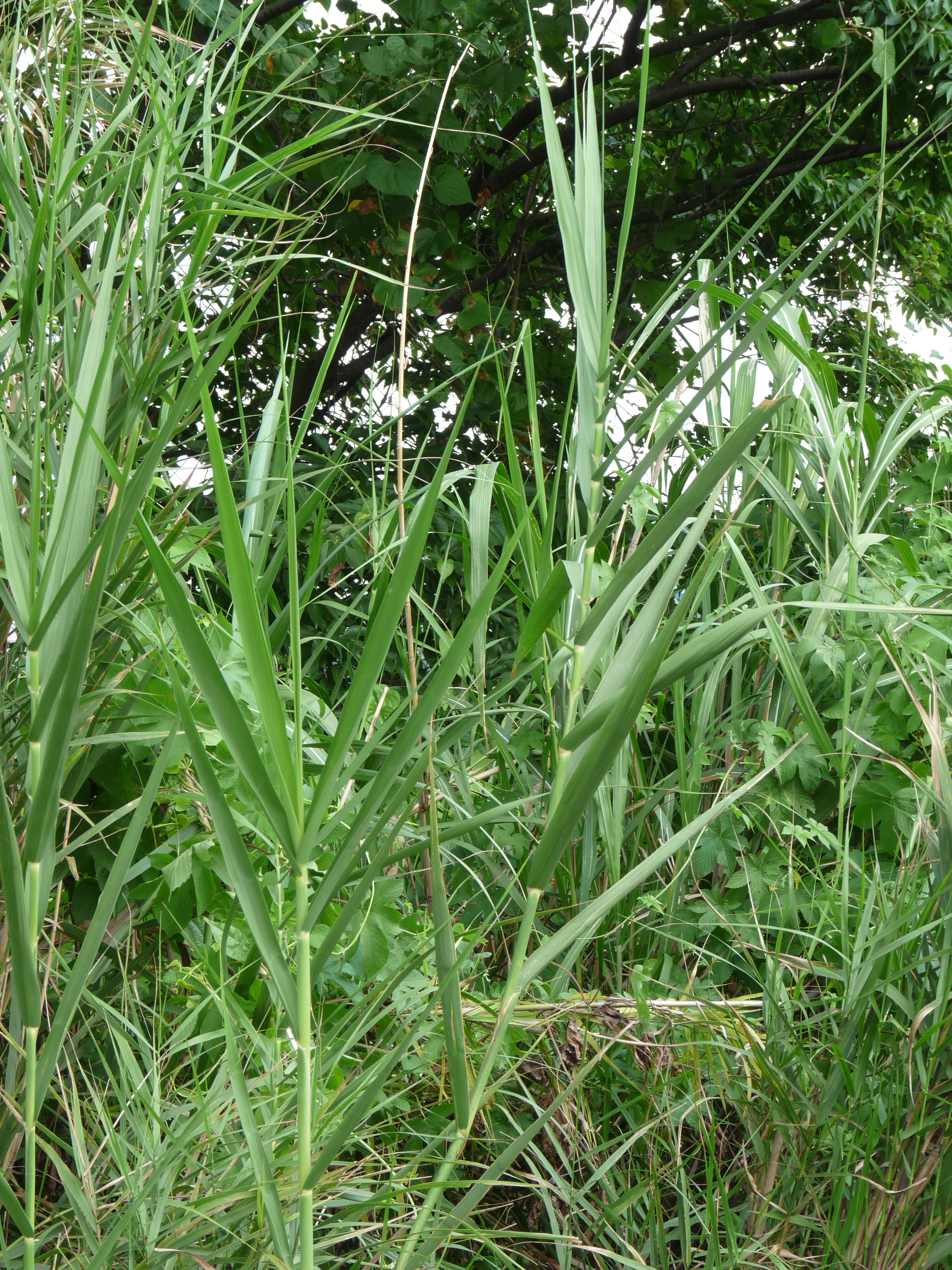

Conservation status
- Least Concern (IUCN 3.1)

Scientific classification
- Kingdom: Plantae
- Clade: Tracheophytes
- Clade: Angiosperms
- Clade: Monocots
- Clade: Commelinids
- Order: Poales
- Family: Poaceae
- Genus: Phragmites
- Species: P. karka

Binomial name
- Phragmites karka (Retz.) Trin. ex Steud.

Synonyms
- List: Arundo karka Retz. 1786; Arundo roxburghii Kunth 1829; Calamagrostis karka (Retz.) J.F.Gmel. 1791; Phragmites roxburghii Steud. 1841; Trichoon karka (Retz.) Roth 1798; Trichoon roxburghii W.Wight 1905; Arundo corea Rottler ex Hook.f. 1896; Arundo tecta Blanco 1837; Arundo tibialis Roxb. ex Wall. 1831; Arundo vallatoria L. 1754; Oxyanthe japonica (Steud.) Steud. 1854; Phragmites bifarius Wight ex Hook.f. 1896; Phragmites cinctus (Hook.f.) B.S.Sun 2003; Phragmites communis var. zeylanicus Nees 1841; Phragmites karka var. cinctus Hook.f. 1896; Phragmites laxiflorus Steud. 1854; Phragmites nepalensis Nees ex Steud. 1854; Phragmites vallatorius (L.) Veldkamp 1992; Sericura japonica Steud. 1846

= Phragmites karka =

Species of flowering plant

Phragmites karka, the tall reed or common reed, is a species of flowering plant in the grass family. It is native to West Africa.

== Other Names ==
Language	Name	Transliteration
Chinese	卡开芦	Pinyin: Kǎ kāi lú
Javanese	Prumpung	
Sundanese	Bayongbong	
Madurese	Parongpong	
Japanese	背高葦	Seitaka Ashi

== Distribution ==
This species has a widespread distribution that includes West Africa, Southern Arabian Peninsula, Kenya, South Asia, Southeast Asia and the Pacific Islands. It is also present in New Zealand, where it is categorised as an invasive weed.

== Description ==
It is a herbaceous, perennial species with a rhizomatous geophyte (underground storage organ) and primarily grows in the tropical regions during the dry season. During the winter, it is deciduous.

Plants can grow to 4–10 metres in height, with a diameter of 15-25mm.

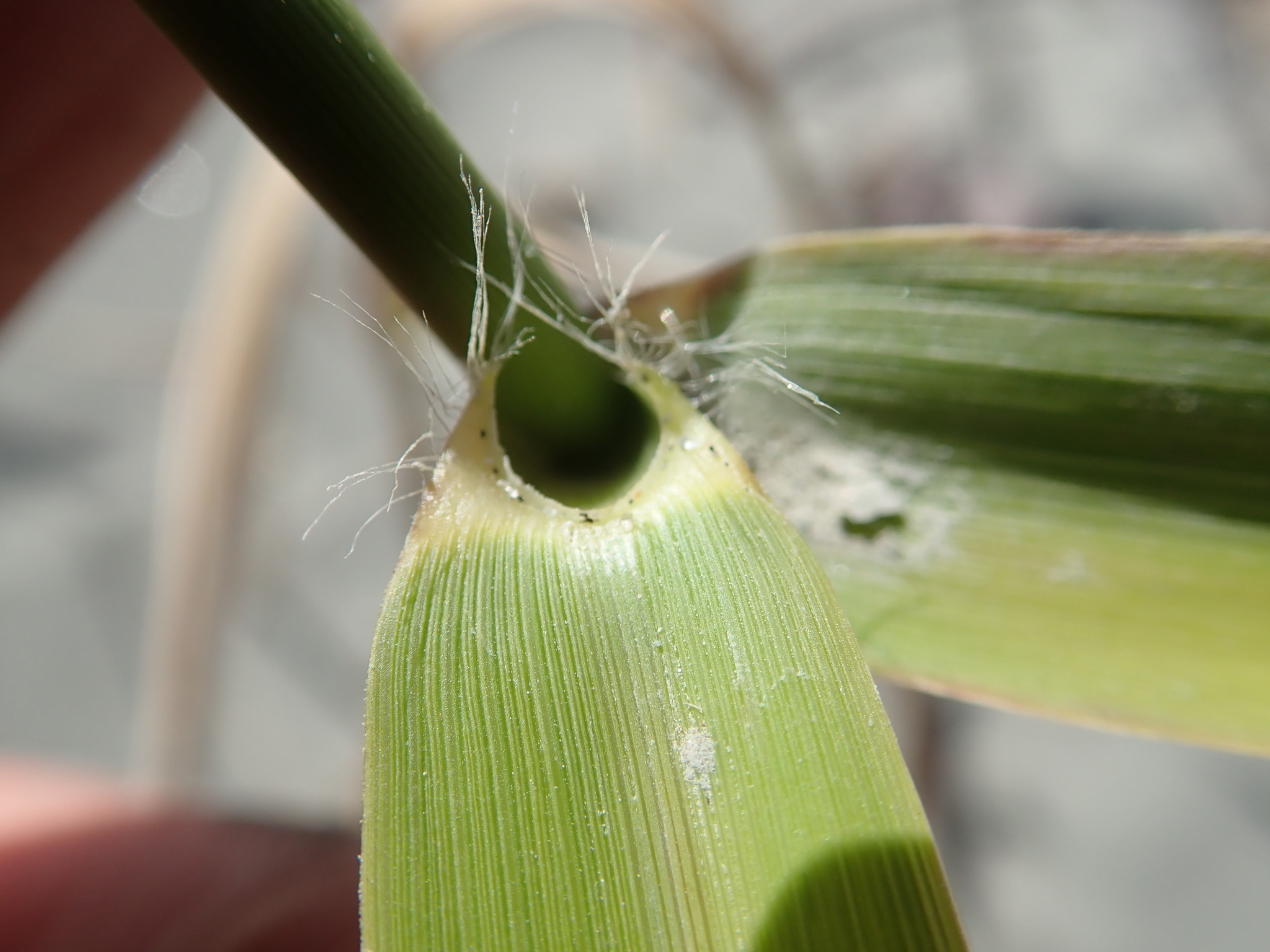
Interior of a tall reed stem

The species is a fast-growing aquatic plant, often found in swamps, riverbanks and standing water, usually at elevations below 1,000 m.

== Uses ==
Locally, this species is utilised as a source of building and construction material, and as food. It is often planted near rivers to purify water, and as an anchor against soil erosion. The young shoots of this plant can be cooked and eaten, like bamboo or asparagus. The young leaves can also be used as fodder. The grass is also use for thatching and making screens, baskets, brooms, hats, mats, paper and reeds for musical instruments and fuel.

In the Philippines, the panicles of this species are bunched-up in a fan-shape to create a broom, with the culms being tightly bound to a central bamboo piece.

== Conservation ==
This widespread, fast-growing species is classified by the IUCN as Least Concern.
