= Kandaha =

Ancient village of Mithila

Kandaha कन्दाहा Kanadabha
- Village
- Kandaha
- Interactive map of Kandaha
- Country: India
- State: Bihar
- Region: Mithila
- Division: Kosi
- District: Saharsa
- Block: Mahishi
- Panchayat: Pastwar
- Named for: Kaṇāda
- Demonym: Maithil

Language
  - Official: Hindi

Regional languages
  - Mother tongue: Ancient: Maithili; Sanskrit

Kandaha (Maithili: कन्दाहा) is a historical village in the Mithila region of the Indian subcontinent. It is located at Pastwar panchayat in the Mahishi block of the Saharsa district in Bihar, India. The village is known for a temple dedicated to Lord Suryanarayana. The temple is called as Kandaha Surya Mandir. Similarly, according to a legend, it is believed to be the birthplace of the Vedic Rishi Kanada. The ancient name of the village is Kanadabha which translates to resembling Kanada. The village holds archeological significance in the region associated with the Oiniwar dynasty in Mithila. The Kandaha Abhilekha is an important historical inscription found in the village that provides some historical information of the royal families in the region. It is located about 14 kilometres from the district headquarter of Saharsa and 5 kilometres from the Gorho Ghat.
