= Abugida =

Syllable-based writing system

Comparison of various abugidas descended from Brahmi script. Sanskrit for May Śiva protect those who take delight in the language of the gods. (Kalidasa)

An abugida (/ˌɑːbuːˈɡiːdə, ˌæb-/; from Ge'ez: አቡጊዳ, romanized: ʾäbugida)—sometimes also called an alphasyllabary, neosyllabary, or pseudo-alphabet—is a segmental writing system in which consonant–vowel sequences are written as units; each unit is based on a consonant letter, and vowel notation is secondary, like a diacritical mark. This contrasts with a full alphabet, in which vowels have status equal to consonants, and with an abjad, in which vowel marking is absent, partial, or optional. In less formal contexts, all three types of script may be termed "alphabets". The terms also contrast them with a syllabary, in which a single symbol denotes the combination of a consonant and a vowel.

Related concepts were introduced independently in 1948 by James Germain Février (using the term néosyllabisme) and David Diringer (using the term semisyllabary), and in 1959 by Fred Householder (introducing the term pseudo-alphabet). The Ethiopic term "abugida" was chosen as a designation for the concept in 1990 by Peter T. Daniels. Faber suggested "segmentally coded syllabically linear phonographic script"; William O. Bright used the term alphasyllabary; and Gnanadesikan and Rimzhim, Katz, & Fowler suggested aksara or āksharik.

Abugidas include the extensive Brahmic family of scripts of Tibet and South and Southeast Asia; Semitic Ethiopic scripts; and Canadian Aboriginal syllabics. As in syllabaries, the writing system's units may consist of representations of both syllables and consonants. For scripts of the Brahmic family, the term akshara is used for the units.

== Etymology ==
In several languages of Ethiopia and Eritrea, abugida traditionally meant letters of the Ethiopic or Geʽez script in which many of these languages are written. The Geʽez script is one of several segmental writing systems; others include Indic/Brahmic scripts and Canadian Aboriginal Syllabics. The word abugida derives from the letters 'ä, bu, gi, and da, in much the same way that abecedary derives from the Latin letters a be ce de, abjad derives from the Arabic a b j d, and alphabet derives from the two first letters in the Greek alphabet, alpha and beta. Abugida as a term in linguistics was proposed by Peter T. Daniels in his 1990 typology of writing systems.

== Terminology ==
As Daniels used the word, an abugida contrasts with a syllabary, where letters with shared consonant or vowel sounds have no particular resemblance. Furthermore, an abugida contrasts with an alphabet proper, where independent letters denote consonants and vowels. The term alphasyllabary was suggested for the Indic scripts in 1997 by William O. Bright, following South Asian linguistic usage, to convey that "they share features of both alphabet and syllabary."

The formal definitions given by Daniels and Bright for abugida and alphasyllabary differ; some writing systems are abugidas but not alphasyllabaries, and some are alphasyllabaries but not abugidas. An abugida is defined as "a type of writing system whose basic characters denote consonants followed by a particular vowel, and in which diacritics denote other vowels". (This "particular vowel" is called the inherent or implicit vowel, as opposed to the explicit vowels marked by the diacritics.)

An alphasyllabary is defined as "a type of writing system in which the vowels are denoted by subsidiary symbols, not all of which occur in a linear order (with relation to the consonant symbols) that is congruent with their temporal order in speech". Bright did not require that an alphabet explicitly represent all vowels. ʼPhags-pa is an example of an abugida because it has an inherent vowel, but it is not an alphasyllabary because its vowels are written in linear order. Modern Lao is an example of an alphasyllabary that is not an abugida, for there is no inherent vowel and its vowels are always written explicitly and not in accordance to their temporal order in speech, meaning that a vowel can be written before, below, or above a consonant letter, while the syllable is still pronounced in the order of a consonant-vowel combination (CV).

== General description ==
The fundamental principles of an abugida apply to words made up of consonant-vowel (CV) syllables. The syllables are written as letters in a straight line, where each syllable is either a letter that represents the sound of a consonant and its inherent vowel or a letter modified to indicate the vowel. Letters can be modified either by means of diacritics or by changes in the form of the letter itself. If all modifications are by diacritics and all diacritics follow the direction of the writing of the letters, the abugida is not an alphasyllabary. But most languages have words that are more complicated than a sequence of CV syllables, even ignoring tone.

The first complication is syllables that consist of just a vowel (V). In some languages, a zero consonant letter is used as though every syllable began with a consonant. In others, each vowel has a separate letter that is used for each syllable consisting of just the vowel. These are known as independent vowels and are found in most Indic scripts. They may be quite different from the corresponding diacritics, known as dependent vowels. As a result of the spread of writing systems, independent vowels may be used to represent syllables beginning with a glottal stop, even for non-initial syllables.

The next two complications are consonant clusters before a vowel (CCV) and syllables ending in a consonant (CVC). The simplest solution, which is not always available, is to break with the principle of writing words as a sequence of syllables and use a letter representing just a consonant (C). This final consonant may be represented by:

- a modification of the final letter that explicitly indicates the lack of a vowel (virama),
- a lack of vowel marking on the letter (often with ambiguity between no vowel and a default inherent vowel),
- vowel marking on the letter for a short or neutral vowel such as schwa (with ambiguity between no vowel and that short or neutral vowel), or
- a visually unrelated letter.

In a true abugida, the lack of distinctive vowel marking of the letter may result from the diachronic loss of the inherent vowel, e.g. by syncope and apocope in Hindi.

When not separating syllables containing consonant clusters (CCV) into C + CV, these syllables are often written by combining the two consonants. In Indic scripts, the earliest method was simply to arrange them vertically, writing the second consonant of the cluster below the first. The two consonants may also merge as conjunct consonant letters, where two or more letters are graphically joined in a ligature, or otherwise change their shapes. Rarely, one of the consonants may be replaced by a gemination mark, e.g. the Gurmukhi addak.

When arranged vertically, as in Burmese or Khmer, they are said to be "stacked". Often there has been a change to writing the two consonants side by side. In the latter case, this combination may be indicated by a diacritic on one of the consonants or a change in the form of one of the consonants, e.g. the half forms of Devanagari. Generally, the reading order of stacked consonants is top to bottom, or the general reading order of the script, but sometimes the reading order is reversed.

The division of a word into syllables for the purposes of writing does not always accord with the language's natural phonetics. For example, Brahmic scripts commonly handle a phonetic sequence CVC-CV as CV-CCV or CV-C-CV, but sometimes phonetic CVC syllables are handled as single units, and the final consonant may be represented:

- in much the same way as the second consonant in CCV, e.g. in the Tibetan, Khmer and Tai Tham scripts. The positioning of the components may be slightly different, as in Khmer and Tai Tham.
- by a special dependent consonant sign, which may be a smaller or differently placed version of the full consonant letter, or may be a distinct sign altogether.
- not at all. For example, repeated consonants need not be represented, homorganic nasals may be ignored, and in Baybayin and Makasar script, the syllable-final consonant was traditionally never represented.

More complicated unit structures (e.g. CC or CCVC) are handled by combining the various techniques above.

Examples using the Devanagari script

- K = /ka/ =
- Ki = /ki/ =
- K* = /k/ = (with a Halant under the character)
- K*M = /kma/ =
- İK = /ika/ =
- İK* = /ik/ =
- İKi = /iki/ =

== Family-specific features ==
The figure shows how syllables are placed in two Brahmic scripts with analogy using the Latin script.

There are three principal families of abugida, distinguished by whether vowels are indicated by modifying consonants by diacritics, distortion, or orientation.

- The oldest and largest is the Brahmic family of India and Southeast Asia, in which vowels are marked with diacritics and syllable-final consonants, when they occur, are indicated with ligatures, diacritics, or with a special vowel-canceling mark.
- In the Geʽez script, vowels are marked by modifying the shapes of the consonants, and one of the vowel-forms serves additionally to indicate final consonants.
- In Canadian Aboriginal syllabics, vowels are marked by rotating or flipping the consonants, and final consonants are indicated with either special diacritics or superscript forms of the main initial consonants.

Lao and Tāna have dependent vowels and a zero vowel sign, but no inherent vowel.

| Feature | North Indic | South Indic | Tāna | Ethiopic | Canadian Aboriginal |
|---|---|---|---|---|---|
| Vowel representation after consonant | Dependent sign (diacritic) in distinct position per vowel | | | Fused diacritic | Rotate/reflect |
| Initial vowel representation | Distinct inline letter per vowel (Note: Tibetan, Róng and Kharoṣṭhī use the glottal stop or zero consonant plus dependent vowel.) | Glottal stop or zero consonant plus dependent vowel (Note: Pali in the Burmese, Khmer and Tai Tham scripts uses independent vowels instead, and they are also used in loan words in the local languages. The Cham script also uses both independent vowels and glottal stop consonant plus dependent vowel. In all three cases, the glottal stop letter is the same as the independent vowel letter for the inherent vowel. Conversely, the Lontara script of Sulawesi uses zero consonant plus vowel.) | | Glottal stop plus dependent | Zero consonant plus dependent |
| Inherent vowel (value of no vowel sign) | [ə], [ɔ], [a], or [o] (Note: Lao has no inherent vowel – it is an alphasyllabary but not an abugida. There is also a Thai-script Pali orthography which has no inherent vowel.) | | No | [ɐ] | N/A |
| Zero vowel sign (sign for no value) | Often | Always used when no final vowel (Note: The Thai, Lao, Tai Viet, Tai Tham and Khmer scripts often or always use the plain letter for word-final consonants, and normally do not use a zero vowel sign. However, the Thai script regularly uses it for Pali and Sanskrit.) | | Ambiguous with ə ([ɨ]) | Shrunk or separate letter (Note: Deviations include omissions and systematic use of i-forms.) |
| Consonant cluster | Conjunct (Note: Often separate and unmodified as a result of syncope. Also, as a legitimate font fall-back, can occur as side-by-side consonants modified only by the inclusion of a virama.) | Stacked or separate (Note: Tamil and Lao have conjuncts formed from straightforward ligation of side by side consonants. Burmese and Tai Tham have a few conjuncts.) | Separate | | |
| Final consonant (not sign) | Inline (Note: Tibetan and Khmer occasionally and Tai Tham regularly write final consonants below the rest of the akshara. This practice is the origin of the Lao letter ຽ U+0EBD LAO SEMIVOWEL SIGN NYO, and a similar sign may be found in Javanese. Tai Tham may also write several final consonants above the rest of the akshara. The Rónɡ script writes final consonants above the rest of the akshara, except that final /ŋ/ precedes the rest. The Philippine scripts do not represent final consonants.) | | Inline | | Inline |
| Distinct final sign | Only for ṃ, ḥ (Note: The symbol for ṃ represents the sound for /m/ or /ŋ/ in some languages, and the symbol for ḥ may represent a ɡlottal stop or even /k/. Not all scripts have these symbols.) (Note: Tai Tham has superscript and subscript signs for final /k/. Javanese and related scripts have a superscript symbol for final /r/, though it is ultimately related to the normal letter for /r/.) | | No | | Only in Western |
| Final sign position | Inline or top | Inline, top or occasionally bottom | N/A | | Raised or inline |
Exceptions

=== Indic (Brahmic) ===
Indic scripts originated in India and spread to Southeast Asia, Bangladesh, Sri Lanka, Nepal, Bhutan, Tibet, Mongolia, and Russia. All surviving Indic scripts are descendants of the Brahmi alphabet. Today they are used in most languages of South Asia (although replaced by Perso-Arabic in Urdu, Kashmiri, and some other languages of Pakistan and India), mainland Southeast Asia (Myanmar, Thailand, Laos, Cambodia, and Vietnam), Tibet (Tibetan), the Indonesian archipelago (Javanese, Balinese, Sundanese, Batak, Lontara, Rejang, Rencong, Makasar, etc.), Philippines (Baybayin, Buhid, Hanunuo, Kulitan, and Aborlan Tagbanwa), and Malaysia (Rencong).

The primary division is between North Indic scripts, used in Northern India, Nepal, Tibet, Bhutan, Mongolia, and Russia, and Southern Indic scripts, used in South India, Sri Lanka and Southeast Asia. South Indic letter forms are more rounded than North Indic forms, though Odia, Golmol and Litumol are rounded. Most North Indic scripts' full letters incorporate a horizontal line at the top, except in Gujarati and Odia; South Indic scripts do not.

Indic scripts indicate vowels through dependent vowel signs (diacritics) around the consonants, often including a sign that explicitly indicates the lack of a vowel. If a consonant has no vowel sign, this indicates a default vowel. Vowel diacritics may appear above, below, to the left of, to the right of, or around the consonant.

The most widely used Indic script is Devanagari, shared by Hindi, Bihari, Marathi, Konkani, Nepali, and often Sanskrit. A basic letter such as क in Hindi represents a syllable with the default vowel, in this case ka ([kə]). In some languages, including Hindi, it becomes a final closing consonant at the end of a word, in this case k. The inherent vowel may be changed by adding vowel marks (diacritics), producing syllables such as कि ki, कु ku, के ke, को ko.

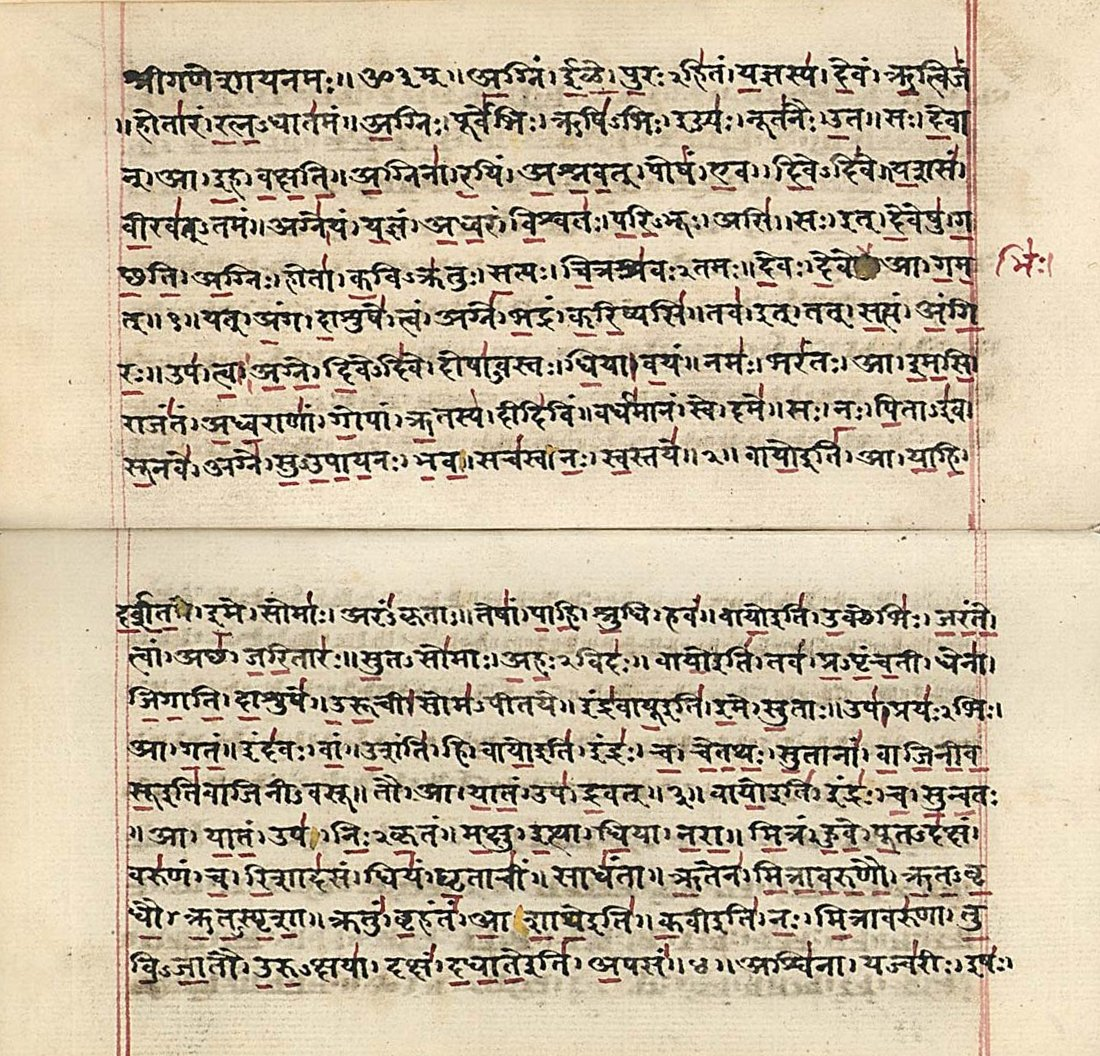
A 19th-century manuscript in the Devanagari script

Diacritic placement in Brahmic abugidas
| position | syllable | pronunciation | base form | script |
|---|---|---|---|---|
| above | के | /keː/ | क /k(a)/ | Devanagari |
| below | कु | /ku/ | क /k(a)/ | Devanagari |
| left | कि | /ki/ | क /k(a)/ | Devanagari |
| right | को | /koː/ | क /k(a)/ | Devanagari |
| around | கௌ | /kau̯/ | க /ka/ | Tamil |
| within | கி | /ki/ | க /ka/ | Tamil |
| surround | កៀ | /kie/ | ក /kɑː/ | Khmer |
| within | ಕಿ | /ki/ | ಕ /ka/ | Kannada |
| within | కి | /ki/ | క /ka/ | Telugu |
| below and extend to the right | ꦏꦾ | /kja/ | ꦏ /ka/ | Javanese |
| below and extend to the left | ꦏꦿꦸ | /kru/ | ꦏ /ka/ | Javanese |

In many Brahmic scripts, a syllable beginning with a cluster is treated as a single character for purposes of vowel marking, so a vowel marker like ि -i, falling before the character it modifies, may appear several positions before the place where it is pronounced. For example, the game cricket in Hindi is क्रिकेट krikeṭ; the diacritic for /i/ appears before the consonant cluster /kr/, not before the /r/. A more unusual example is seen in the Batak alphabet: the syllable bim is written ba-ma-i-(virama). That is, the vowel diacritic and virama are both written after the consonants for the whole syllable.

In many abugidas, there is also a diacritic to suppress the inherent vowel, yielding the bare consonant. In Devanagari, प् is p, and फ् is ph. This is called the virāma or halantam in Sanskrit. It may be used to form consonant clusters or to indicate that a consonant occurs at the end of a word. Thus in Sanskrit, a default vowel consonant such as फ does not take on a final consonant sound. Instead, it keeps its vowel. For writing two consonants without a vowel in between, instead of using diacritics on the first consonant to remove its vowel, another common method of special conjunct forms is used in which two or more consonant characters are merged to express a cluster, as in Devanagari's अप्फ appha. (Some fonts display this as प् followed by फ, rather than forming a conjunct. This expedient is used by ISCII and South Asian scripts of Unicode.) Thus a closed syllable such as phaṣ requires two aksharas to write: फष् phaṣ.

The Róng script used for the Lepcha language goes further than other Indic abugidas, in that a single akshara can represent a closed syllable: Not only the vowel but any final consonant is indicated by a diacritic. For example, the syllable [sok] would be written as something like s̥̽, here with an underring representing /o/ and an overcross representing the diacritic for final /k/. Most other Indic abugidas can indicate only a very limited set of final consonants with diacritics, such as /ŋ/ or /r/, if they can indicate any at all.

=== Ethiopic ===
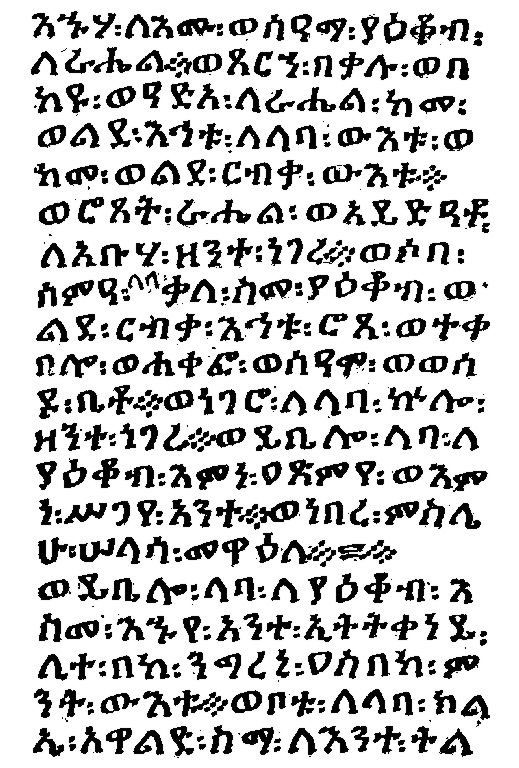
The Geʽez script, an abugida of Eritrea and Ethiopia

In Geʽez script, fidels (individual "letters" of the script) have diacritics that are fused with the consonants to the point that they must be considered modifications of the form of the letters. Children learn each modification separately, as in a syllabary; nonetheless, the graphic similarities between syllables with the same consonant are readily apparent, unlike in a true syllabary.

Though now an abugida, the Geʽez script, until the advent of Christianity (c. AD 350), was what would now be termed an abjad. In the Geʽez script (or fidel), the letter's base form (also called fidel) may be altered. For example, ሀ hä [hə] (base form), ሁ hu (with a right-side diacritic that does not alter the letter), ሂ hi (with a subdiacritic that compresses the consonant, so it is the same height), ህ hə [hɨ] or [h] (where the letter is modified with a kink in the left arm).

=== Canadian Aboriginal syllabics ===
In the family known as Canadian Aboriginal syllabics, which was inspired by Devanagari script, vowels are indicated by changing the orientation of the syllabogram. Each vowel has a consistent orientation; for example, Inuktitut ᐱ pi, ᐳ pu, ᐸ pa; ᑎ ti, ᑐ tu, ᑕ ta. Although a vowel is inherent in each, all rotations have equal status and none can be identified as basic. Bare consonants are indicated either by separate diacritics or by superscript versions of the aksharas; there is no vowel-killer mark.

== Borderline cases ==
=== Vowelled abjads ===
Abjads are typically written without indication of many vowels, but in some contexts, such as teaching materials or scriptures, Arabic and Hebrew are written with full indication of vowels via diacritic marks (harakat, niqqud), making them effectively alphasyllabaries.

The Arabic scripts used for Kurdish in Iraq and for Uyghur in Xinjiang, China, as well as the Hebrew script of Yiddish, are fully vowelled, but because the vowels are written with full letters rather than diacritics (with the exception of distinguishing between /a/ and /o/ in the latter) and there are no inherent vowels, these are considered alphabets, not abugidas.

The Arabic script used for South Azerbaijani generally writes the vowel /æ/ (written as ə in North Azerbaijani) as a diacritic but all other vowels as full letters (like Kurdish and Uyghur). This means that when no vowel diacritics are present (most of the time), it technically has an inherent vowel. But like the Phagspa and Meroitic scripts, whose status as abugidas is controversial (see below), all other vowels are written in-line. Additionally, the practice of explicitly writing all-but-one vowel does not apply to loanwords from Arabic and Persian, so the script does not have an inherent vowel for Arabic and Persian words. The inconsistency of its vowel notation makes it difficult to categorize.

=== Phagspa ===
The imperial Mongol script called Phagspa was derived from the Tibetan abugida, but all vowels are written in-line rather than as diacritics. However, it retains the features of having an inherent vowel /a/ and having distinct initial vowel letters.

=== Pahawh ===
Pahawh Hmong is a non-segmental script that indicates syllable onsets and rimes, such as consonant clusters and vowels with final consonants. Thus it is not segmental and cannot be considered an abugida. It superficially resembles an abugida with the roles of consonant and vowel reversed. Most syllables are written with two letters in the order rime–onset (typically vowel-consonant) even though they are pronounced as onset-rime (consonant-vowel), rather like the position of the /i/ vowel in Devanagari, which is written before the consonant. Pahawh is also unusual in that, while an inherent rime /āu/ (with mid tone) is unwritten, it also has an inherent onset /k/. For the syllable /kau/, which requires that one of the inherent sounds be overt, it is /au/ that is written. Thus the rime (vowel) is basic to the system.

=== Meroitic ===
Drawing a dividing line between abugidas and other segmental scripts can be difficult. For example, the Meroitic script of ancient Sudan does not indicate an inherent a (one symbol stood for both m and ma, for example) and is thus similar to Brahmic family of abugidas. But other vowels were indicated with full letters, not diacritics or modification, so the system is essentially an alphabet that does not bother to write the most common vowel.

=== Shorthand ===
Several systems of shorthand use diacritics for vowels, but do not have an inherent vowel, and are thus more similar to Thaana and Kurdish script than to Brahmic scripts. The Gabelsberger shorthand system and its derivatives modify the following consonant to represent vowels. The Pollard script, which was based on shorthand, also uses diacritics for vowels; the placements of the vowel relative to the consonant indicate tone. Pitman shorthand uses straight strokes and quarter-circle marks in different orientations as the principal "alphabet" of consonants; vowels are shown as light and heavy dots, dashes, and other marks in one of three possible positions to indicate the various vowel-sounds. To increase writing speed, Pitman has rules for "vowel indication" using the positioning or choice of consonant signs so that writing vowel-marks can be dispensed with.

== Development ==
As the term alphasyllabary suggests, abugidas have been considered an intermediate step between alphabets and syllabaries. Historically, most abugidas appear to have evolved from abjads (vowelless alphabets). They contrast with syllabaries, where there is a distinct symbol for each syllable or consonant-vowel combination, and where these have no systematic similarity to each other, and typically develop directly from logographic scripts. Compare the examples above to sets of syllables in the Japanese hiragana syllabary: か ka, き ki, く ku, け ke, こ ko have nothing in common to indicate k; while ら ra, り ri, る ru, れ re, ろ ro have neither anything in common for r nor anything to indicate that they have the same vowels as the k set.

Most Indian and Indochinese abugidas appear to have developed from abjads with the Kharoṣṭhī and Brāhmī scripts; the abjad in question is usually considered the Aramaic one, but while the link between Aramaic and Kharosthi is more or less undisputed, this is not so with Brahmi. The Kharosthi family does not survive today, but Brahmi's descendants include most of the modern scripts of South and Southeast Asia.

The Geʽez script derives from a different abjad, the Sabean script of Yemen; the advent of vowels coincided with the introduction or adoption of Christianity about AD 350. The Ethiopic script is the elaboration of an abjad.

The Cree syllabary was invented with full knowledge of the Devanagari system.

The Meroitic script was developed from Egyptian hieroglyphs, in which various schemes of "group writing" were used to show vowels.

== List of abugidas ==
- Brahmic family, descended from Brāhmī (c. 4th century BC)
  - Ahom
  - Assamese
  - Balinese
  - Batak – Toba and other Batak languages
  - Baybayin – Ilocano, Pangasinan, Tagalog, Bikol languages, Visayan languages, and possibly other Philippine languages
  - Bengali – Bengali
  - Bhaiksuki
  - Brahmi – Sanskrit, Prakrit
  - Buhid
  - Burmese – Burmese, Karen languages, Mon, and Shan
  - Chakma
  - Cham
  - Devanagari – Hindi, Sanskrit, Marathi, Nepali, Konkani and other languages of northern India
  - Dhives Akuru
  - Grantha – Sanskrit
  - Gujarati – Gujarāti, Kachchi
  - Gurmukhi script – Punjabi
  - Hanunó’o
  - Javanese
  - Kaganga – Lampung, Rencong, Rejang
  - Kaithi – Bhojpuri and other languages of northern and eastern India
  - Kannada – Kannada, Tulu, Konkani, Kodava
  - Kalinga script
  - Kawi
  - Khmer
  - Khojki
  - Khotanese
  - Khudawadi
  - Kolezhuthu – Tamil, Malayalam
  - Kulitan
  - Lao
  - Leke
  - Lepcha
  - Limbu
  - Lontara' – Buginese, Makassar, and Mandar
  - Mahajani
  - Malayalam – Malayalam
  - Malayanma – Malayalam
  - Marchen – Zhang-Zhung
  - Meetei Mayek
  - Modi – Marathi
  - Multani – Saraiki
  - Nandinagari – Sanskrit
  - Newar – Nepal Bhasa, Sanskrit
  - New Tai Lue
  - Odia
  - Pallava script – Tamil, Sanskrit, various Prakrits
  - Phags-pa – Mongolian, Chinese, and other languages of the Yuan dynasty Mongol Empire
  - Ranjana – Nepal Bhasa, Sanskrit
  - Sharada – Sanskrit
  - Siddham – Sanskrit
  - Sinhala
  - Sourashtra
  - Soyombo
  - Sundanese
  - Sylheti Nagri – Sylheti language
  - Tagbanwa – Palawan languages
  - Tai Dam
  - Tai Le
  - Tai Tham – Khün, and Northern Thai
  - Takri
  - Tamil
  - Telugu
  - Thai
  - Tibetan
  - Tigalari – Sanskrit, Tulu
  - Tirhuta – Maithili
  - Tocharian
  - Vatteluttu – Tamil, Malayalam
  - Zanabazar Square
  - Zhang zhung scripts
- Kharoṣṭhī, from the 3rd century BC
- Meroitic
- Geʽez script, from the 4th century AD
- Canadian Aboriginal syllabics
  - Cree – Ojibwe syllabics
  - Blackfoot syllabics
  - Carrier syllabics
  - Inuktitut syllabics
- Pollard script
- Pitman shorthand
- Xiao'erjing

=== Fictional ===
- Tengwar

=== Abugida-like scripts ===
- Meroitic (an alphabet with an inherent vowel) – Meroitic, Old Nubian (possibly)
- Thaana (abugida with no inherent vowel)
