= Malayanma =

Writing system

- Script type: Abugida
- Languages: Malayalam

Related scripts
- Parent systems: Proto-Sinaitic alphabet: Phoenician alphabet; Aramaic alphabet; Brāhmī; Tamil-Brahmi; Vatteluttu; Malayanma
- Sister systems: Kolezhuthu

Malayanma script was a writing system used in Thiruvananthapuram district of Kerala. It was used to write the Malayalam language. Malayanma belongs to the same script family like Kolezhuthu and Vattezhuthu.

== Unicode ==
Not yet added to unicode, no proposals yet.
