= Menn =

Menn is a surname. Notable people with the surname include:

- Barthélemy Menn (1815–1893), Swiss painter and draughtsman
- Christian Menn (1927–2018), bridge designer from Switzerland
- Julius Menn (1929–2018), Holocaust survivor
- Lise Menn (born 1941), American linguist who specializes in psycholinguistics
- Stephen Menn (born 1964), teaches philosophy at McGill University
- Suibne Menn (died 628), an Irish king who is counted as a High King of Ireland

== See also ==
- Le Menn (disambiguation)
- Men, the plural of man
- Raske Menn, trio of Norwegian comedians
- Vi Menn, Scandinavia and Norway's largest weekly lifestyle magazine for men
