= WLL =

WLL can refer to:

- West London line, a railway line in London
- Whole lung lavage, a medical procedure
- Wikipedia Loves Libraries
- Wireless local loop
- With Limited Liability
- Women's Labour League
- Women's Labour League (Canada), several related organizations active in the early 20th century
- Women's Lacrosse League
- Working load limit
- Written Language and Literacy, a journal of linguistics
