= Standardisation of Tamil script =

Standardisation of Tamil script includes various attempts in the past as well as ongoing attempts to uniformalise the Tamil script.

== Historical background ==
Tamil-Brahmi is considered to be the earliest script used to write the Tamil language. This was replaced by Vattezhuttu, possibly due to writing on palm-leaves. The relationship between Vattezhuttu and Tamil-Brahmi are inconclusive.

== Pallava dynasty revision ==
The Pallava court of Mahendravarman I replaced Vattezhuttu with two scripts: Tamil script and Pallava grantha to write Tamil and Sanskrit respectively. Pallava grantha was also divided into early and late forms. Late Pallava grantha is the precursor to the Kawi script. Although, whether the Tamil script emerged during the Pallava dynasty or indeed from Tamil-Brahmi is contested among scholars.

== Vīramāmunivar revision ==
In his Tonnūḷ Viḷakkam, he differentiated between elongated and shortened vowel sounds in the Tamil script. For instance, 'எ' used to be written for both 'e' and 'é' before Veeramamunivar who introduced 'ஏ'. He brought about எ, ஏ, ஒ and ஓ.

The Tolkāppiyam use of the puḷḷi, which had fallen into disuse was revived by Veeramamunivar.

== Simplified Tamil script ==
The government of Tamil Nadu introduced some reforms in the script in order to simplify it.
