= The World's Writing Systems =

1996 reference book about writing systems

- Editors: Peter T. Daniels; William Bright
- Publisher: Oxford University Press
- Publication date: February 8, 1996
- Pages: 968
- ISBN: 978-0-195-07993-7

The World's Writing Systems is a reference book about the world's writing systems. The book is edited by Peter T. Daniels and William Bright and was first published by Oxford University Press in 1996.

The World's Writing Systems systematically explores most of the world's writing systems from the earliest times onwards. There are seventy-four signed articles, arranged in thirteen groups, with seventy-nine contributors (some articles have shared credit, while others merely consulted).
