= Le Menn =

Le Menn may refer to:

- Camille Le Menn (born 1934), French racing cyclist
- Gwennole Le Menn (1938–2009), Breton writer, editor and lexicographer
- Jacky Le Menn (1941–2025), French politician

== See also ==
- Menn, a surname
- Lemann, a surname
