= Susie Bright =

American writer and feminist

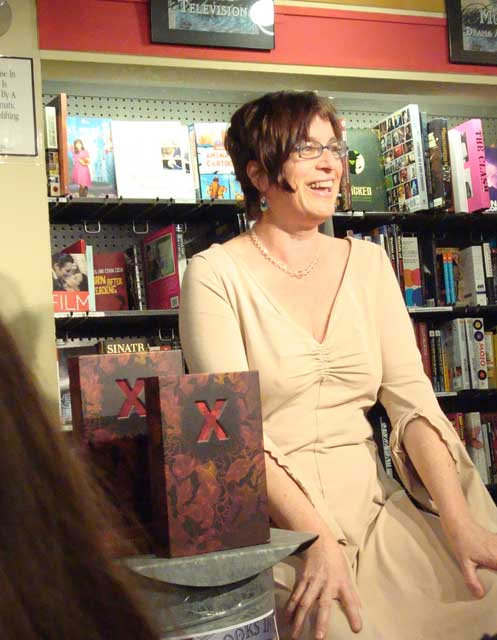
- Bright at Come as You Are in 2012
- Born: Susannah Bright; March 25, 1958 (age 68); Arlington, Virginia, U.S.
- Other name: Susie Sexpert
- Education: University of California, Santa Cruz; New College of California
- Occupations: Feminist; author; journalist; critic; editor; publisher; producer; performer
- Notable work: Big Sex, Little Death: a Memoir, Full Exposure, Susie Bright's Sexual State of the Union, SexWise
- Movement: Sex-positive feminist
- Parent(s): William Bright and Elizabeth Bright

Susannah Bright (born March 25, 1958) is an American feminist, author and journalist, often writing on the subject of politics and sexuality.

She is the recipient of the 2017 Humanist Feminist Award, and is one of the early writers/activists referred to as a sex-positive feminist. Her papers are part of the Human Sexuality Collection at Cornell University Library along with the archives of On Our Backs.

== Early life ==
Bright was born on March 25, 1958, in Arlington, Virginia, to two linguist parents, William and Elizabeth Bright. She spent most of her childhood in Los Angeles, though she moved to Canada with her mother for a few years before returning for high school. When Bright was just eight, she created pamphlets criticizing Ronald Reagan's campaign for California governor, and by the age of 10, she had abandoned religion completely. Her father subscribed her to Ms. Magazine when she was 12, which influenced her interests in feminism. Bright later dropped out of high school and studied theater and women's studies at the University of California, Santa Cruz, where she earned a degree in community studies.

== Career ==
As a teenager in the 1970s, Susie Bright was active in the feminist, civil rights, and anti-war movements. She was a member of the high school underground newspaper The Red Tide and served as the plaintiff suing the Los Angeles Board of Education for the right of minors to distribute their own publications without prior censorship or approval. (Judgement in favor of Plaintiff).

She was a member of the International Socialists from 1974 to 1976 and worked as a labor and community organizer in Los Angeles, the San Francisco Bay Area, Detroit, and Louisville, Kentucky. She was also one of the founding members of Teamsters for a Democratic Union, and wrote under the pseudonym Sue Daniels in both The Red Tide and Workers' Power. She has said "I was motivated, always, from the sting of social injustice. The cry of 'That isn't fair!' gets a more impulsive behavior from me than, 'I want to get off!'"

Bright was one of the early staff members of Good Vibrations, a pioneering feminist sex toy store, working at and managing the store from 1981 to 1986. She trained with San Francisco Sex Information in 1981. She wrote Good Vibrations' first mail order catalog, the first sex toy catalog written from a women's point of a view for a female audience. She founded the Good Vibrations Erotic Video Library, the first feminist curation of erotic films available at the time.

Susie Bright co-founded and edited the first women-produced sex-magazine On Our Backs, "entertainment for the adventurous lesbian", from 1984 to 1991. Here she began her sex advice column as "Susie Sexpert". She collected these columns and expanded them to publish her first book, Susie Sexpert's Lesbian Sex World in 1990.

Bright co-edited with Jill Posener and published a portfolio of lesbian erotic photography titled Nothing but the Girl, with 30 interviews with the photographers. It won the Firecracker Award and the Lambda Literary Award in 1997.

Bright founded the first women's erotica book-series Herotica and edited the first three volumes. She started the national bestselling The Best American Erotica series in 1993.

From 1992 to 1994, she was the contributing editor and columnist for San Francisco Review of Books.

Bright was the first female member of the X-Rated Critics Organization in 1986 and was voted into the XRCO Hall of Fame, 5th Estate, in 2005.

Known as the "Pauline Kael of Porn", she wrote feminist reviews of erotic films for Penthouse Forum from 1986 to 1989. She was the first mainstream journalist who covered the adult industry trade— and the first scholar to teach the aesthetics and politics of erotic film imagery, starting in 1986 at Cal Arts Valencia, and then in the early 1990s at the University of California. Her film-reviews of mainstream movies are widely published, and her comments on gay film history are featured in the documentary film The Celluloid Closet. As well, she was featured in Maya Gallus's 1997 documentary film Erotica: A Journey Into Female Sexuality.

Bright produced, co-wrote and starred in two plays, Girls Gone Bad and Knife, Paper, Scissors. She worked as a screenwriter and film consultant on several films: Erotique, Monika Treut's Die Jungfrauenmaschine (aka Virgin Machine) film in 1988 as "Susie Sexper",The Celluloid Closet, The Criterion Collection's edition of Luis Buñuel’s Belle de Jour, and the Wachowskis' film, Bound (in which she also had a cameo appearance). She also appeared as "Susie Bright, the feminist sex writer" in an episode of the HBO series Six Feet Under.

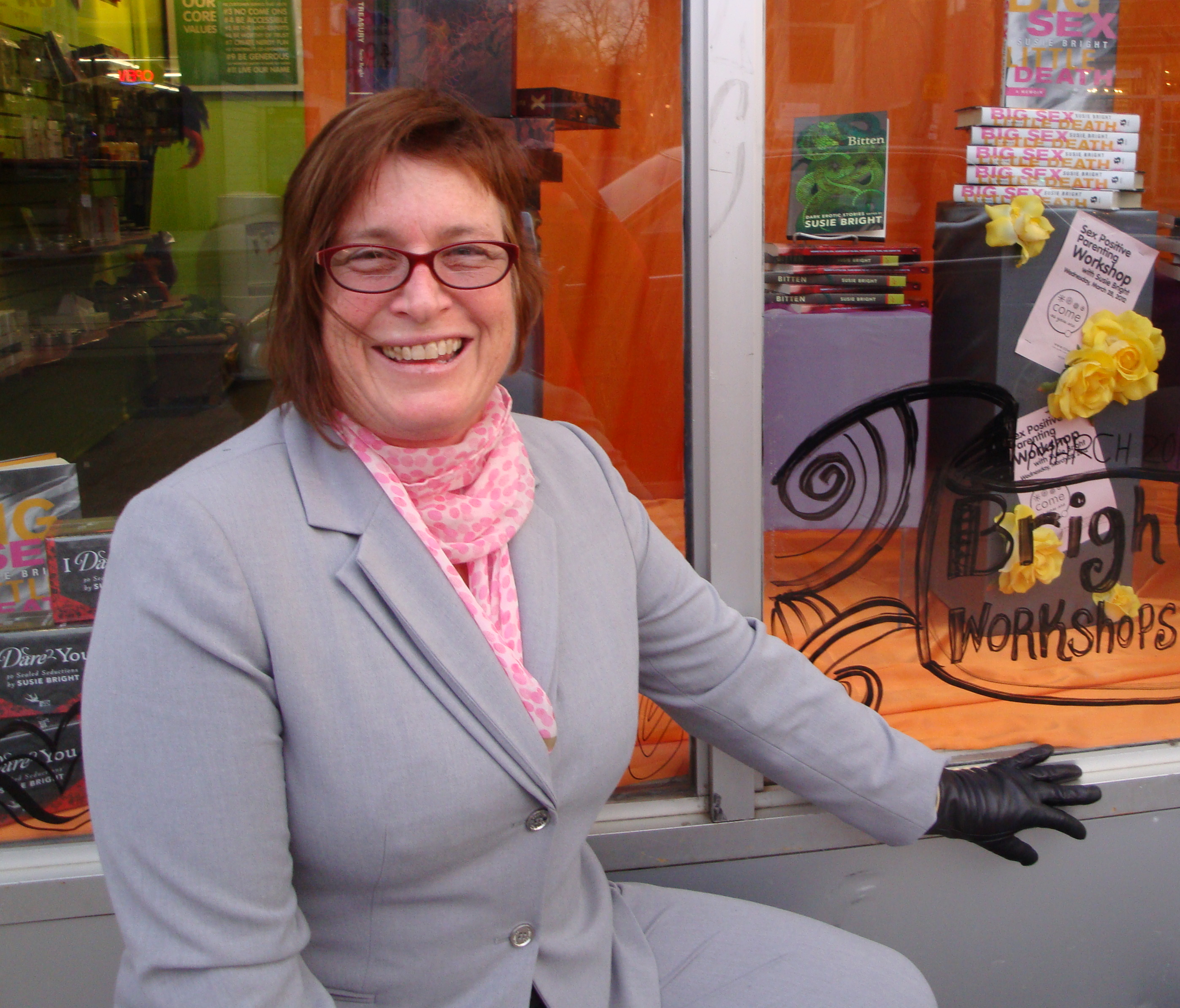
Bright in Toronto

In 2013, Bright donated her archives to the Division of Rare and Manuscript Collections Cornell University Library. They included papers and documents from her early activist days in The Red Tide, Teamsters for a Democratic Union, and International Socialists, her early stage and film work, a complete archive of On Our Backs magazine and Fatale Videos, her reviews and research as a critic for Penthouse Forum, and the X-Rated Critics Association, all of her nonfiction manuscripts and anthology research for "Best American Erotica", costumes, VHS tapes, books, writings— as well as many other artist files from the early lesbian feminist and erotic literary fiction publishing era.

The donation culminated with the 2014 year-long exhibit Speaking of Sex. where Bright's donations were displayed along with a wide array of the Human Sexuality Collection's historical documents and materials. As part of the exhibit's grand opening, Bright gave the lecture "The Sexual State of the Union", analyzing current sexual attitudes in America, and reprised her show "How to Read a Dirty Movie".

In 2022, Bright was in residence at the Cornell University Library for the exhibition Radical Desire: Making On Our Backs Magazine where she presented the panel discussion Making a Lesbian Sex Magazine in the Age of the Feminist Sex Wars with Lulu Belliveau, Phyllis Christopher, Del LaGrace, Morgan Gwenwald, Nan Kinney, Jill Posener, Jessica Tanzer, Deborah Sundahl, Karen Williams, and On Our Backs’ staffers, artists, and models.

Susie Bright was an editor-at-large and executive producer at Audible Inc. between 2012 and 2023. Her imprint is The Bright List. She has been nominated or awarded an Audie Award four times, including for her production of The Autobiography of Malcolm X. She has produced audiobook titles by Margaret Atwood, Pablo Neruda, Che Guevara, Frank O’Hara, Martin Luther King, Cornel West, Gary Snyder, Charles Bukowski, Noam Chomsky, Ron Kovic and Bruce Springsteen, Betty Medsger, Dorothy Allison, Dan Savage, Tony Hillerman, Joy Harjo, Octavia Butler, and Dave Hickey.

== Personal life ==
Bright is the daughter of linguist William Bright and Elizabeth Bright. Her stepmother is Lise Menn, and her stepbrothers are Joseph Menn and Stephen Menn.

Bright lived with her partner Honey Lee Cottrell in the 1980s. She is married to Jon Bailiff, with whom she has one daughter, Aretha Bright.

== Books ==
As editor

- Bright, Susie; Blank, Joani, eds. (1995). Totally Herotica: A Collection of Women's Erotic Fiction. New York: Quality Paperback Book Club. OCLC 36621041.
- Bright, Susie, ed. (1988). Herotica: A Collection of Women's Erotic Fiction. Burlingame, California: Down There Press. ISBN 9780940208117.
- Bright, Susie; Blank, Joani, eds. (1991). Herotica 2: A Collection of Women's Erotic Fiction. New York, New York: Plume. ISBN 9780452267879.
- Bright, Susie, ed. (1993). The best American Erotica, 1993 (15th ed.). New York, New York: Collier Books. ISBN 9780020792628.

- Bright, Susie, ed. (2008). The best of Best American Erotica, 2008 (15th ed.). New York: Simon & Schuster. ISBN 9780743289634.

- Bright, Susie, ed. (1994). Herotica 3: An Anthology of Women's Erotic Fiction. New York: Plume. ISBN 9780452271807.
- Bright, Susie; Posener, Jill, eds. (1996). Nothing but the Girl: the Blatant Lesbian Image: A Portfolio and Exploration of Lesbian Erotic Photography. New York, New York: Freedom Editions. ISBN 9781860470028.
- Bright, Susie, ed. (1998). Herotica: A Collection of Women's Erotic Fiction (10th anniversary ed.). San Francisco, California: Down There Press. ISBN 9780940208247. With introduction and afterword by the Bright.
- Bright, Susie, ed. (2004). Susie Bright Presents Three the Hard Way: Erotic Novellas. New York: Simon & Schuster. ISBN 9780743245494. Authors: William Harrison, Greg Boyd, and Tsaurah Litzky.
- Bright, Susie, ed. (2005). Susie Bright Presents Three Kinds of Asking for It: Erotic Novellas. New York: Simon & Schuster. ISBN 9780743245500. Authors: Eric Albert, Greta Christina, and Joey Soloway (writing as Jill Soloway).
- Bright, Susie, ed. (2008). X: The Erotic Treasury. San Francisco: Chronicle Books. ISBN 9780811864022.
- Bright, Susie, ed. (2009). Bitten: Dark Erotic Stories. San Francisco: Chronicle Books. ISBN 9780811864251.
- Bright, Susie, ed. (2018). Santa Cruz Noir. Brooklyn: Akashic Books. ISBN 9781617756221.

As author

- Bright, Susie (1990). Susie Sexpert's Lesbian Sex World. Pittsburgh, Pennsylvania: Cleis Press. ISBN 9780939416356.
- Juno, Andrea (Fall 1991). Angry women (interview with Susie Bright). Vol. 13. RE/Search Publications. ISBN 9780940642249.
- Bright, Susie (1992). Susie Bright's Sexual Reality: A Virtual Sex World Reader. Pittsburgh, Pennsylvania: Cleis Press. ISBN 9780939416592.
- Bright, Susie (1995). Susie Bright's Sexwise. Pittsburgh, Pennsylvania: Cleis Press. ISBN 9781573440035.
- Bright, Susie (1997). Susie Bright's Sexual State of the Union. New York, New York: Simon & Schuster. ISBN 9780684800233.

- Bright, Susie (1998). The Sexual State of the Union (trade ed.). New York: Simon & Schuster. ISBN 9780684838502.

- Bright, Susie (1998). Susie Sexpert's Lesbian Sex World (1st ed.). New York, NY: Freedom Editions. ISBN 9781860470059.
- Bright, Susie (1998). Nothing But the Girl: The Blatant Lesbian Image: A Portfolio and Exploration of Lesbian Erotic Photography (2nd ed.). San Francisco, California Berkeley, California: Cleis Press Distributed by Publishers Group West. ISBN 9781573440776.
- Bright, Susie (1999). Full exposure: Opening Up to Sexual Creativity and Erotic Expression. San Francisco: HarperSanFrancisco. ISBN 9780062515919.
- Bright, Susie (2001). How to Write a Dirty Story. Susie Bright. ISBN 9781931391306.
- Bright, Susie (2003). Mommy's Little Girl: On Sex, Motherhood, Porn, and Cherry Pie. New York: Thunder's Mouth Press. ISBN 9781560255512.
- Bright, Susie (2005). Inspired By Andrea Dworkin: Essays on Lust, Aggression, Porn, & The Female Gaze That I Might Not Have Written If Not for Her. Santa Cruz: Susie Bright. ASIN B0041OSGGG.
- Bright, Susie (2011). Big sex, Little Death: A Memoir. Berkeley, California: Seal Press. ISBN 9781580052641.

== Awards ==
- National Leather Association International’s Jan Lyon Award for Regional or Local Work, 1987
- Humanist Feminist Award, 2017
- Audie Award Winner, Carrie's Story, Executive Producer, 2014
- Audie Award Nominee, The Invisible Heart, Executive Producer, 2014
- Audie Award Nominee, Naked at Any Age, Executive Producer, 2013
- Audie Award, Best Memoir/Autobiography, Best Male Performance, "The Autobiography of Malcolm X", co-producer, 2021
- Gail Rich Award, Santa Cruz, 2002
- Lambda Literary Award, Nothing but the Girl, 1997
- Firecracker Alternative Book Award, Nothing but the Girl, 1997
- Utne Reader Visionary, 1995
