= Syllabary =

Written set of symbols for syllables or moras of spoken words

In the linguistic study of written languages, a syllabary is a set of written symbols that represent the syllables or (more frequently) morae which make up words.

A symbol in a syllabary, called a syllabogram, typically represents an (optional) consonant sound (simple onset) followed by a vowel sound (nucleus)—that is, a CV (consonant+vowel) or V syllable—but other phonographic mappings, such as CVC, CV- tone, and C (normally nasals at the end of syllables), are also found in syllabaries.

== Types ==
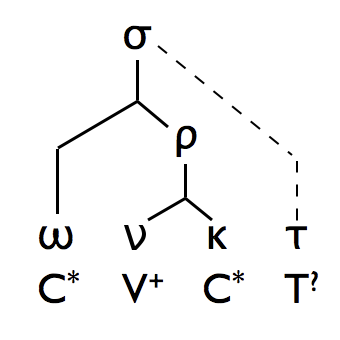
Each syllable (σ) branches into consonantal onset (ω) and rime (ρ) that is divided into nucleus (ν) and coda (κ), non-/supra-segmental parameters like tone (τ) affect the syllable as a whole

A writing system using a syllabary is complete when it covers all syllables in the corresponding spoken language without requiring complex orthographic / graphemic rules, like implicit codas (⟨C_{1}V⟩ ⇒ /C_{1}VC_{2}/), silent vowels (⟨C_{1}V_{1}+C_{2}V_{2}⟩ ⇒ /C_{1}V_{1}C_{2}/) or echo vowels (⟨C_{1}V_{1}+C_{2}V_{1}⟩ ⇒ /C_{1}V_{1}C_{2}/). This loosely corresponds to shallow orthographies in alphabetic writing systems.

True syllabograms are those that encompass all parts of a syllable, i.e., initial onset, medial nucleus and final coda, but since onset and coda are optional in at least some languages, there are middle (nucleus), start (onset-nucleus), end (nucleus-coda) and full (onset-nucleus-coda) true syllabograms. Most syllabaries only feature one or two kinds of syllabograms and form other syllables by graphemic rules.

Syllabograms, hence syllabaries, are pure, analytic or arbitrary if they do not share graphic similarities that correspond to phonic similarities, e.g. the symbol for ka does not resemble in any predictable way the symbol for ki, nor the symbol for a. Otherwise, they are synthetic, if they vary by onset, rime, nucleus or coda, or systematic, if they vary by all of them. Some scholars, e.g., Daniels, reserve the general term for analytic syllabaries and invent other terms (abugida, abjad) as necessary.

== Languages using syllabaries ==
Syllabaries often begin as simplified logograms, as shown here with the Japanese katakana writing system. At the bottom of each cell is the modern letter, with its original Chinese character form above.

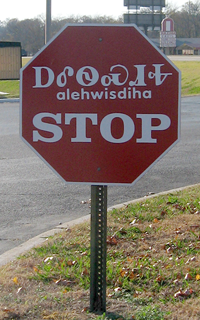
Multilingual stop sign employing the Latin alphabet and the Cherokee syllabary in Tahlequah, Oklahoma

Languages that use syllabic writing include Japanese, Cherokee, Vai, the Yi languages of eastern Asia, the English-based creole language Ndyuka, Xiangnan Tuhua, and the ancient language Mycenaean Greek (Linear B). The Cretan Linear A and its derivative Cypro-Minoan are also believed by some to be syllabic scripts, although as they remain undecoded, this has not been confirmed.

Chinese characters, the cuneiform script used for Sumerian, Akkadian and other languages, and the former Maya script are largely syllabic in nature, although based on logograms. They are therefore sometimes referred to as logosyllabic.

The contemporary Japanese language uses two syllabaries together called kana (in addition to the non-syllabic systems kanji and romaji), namely hiragana and katakana, which were developed around 800 CE. Because Japanese uses mainly CV (consonant + vowel) syllables, a syllabary is well suited to write the language. As in many syllabaries, vowel sequences and final consonants are written with separate glyphs, so that both atta and kaita are written with three kana: あった (a-t-ta) and かいた (ka-i-ta). It is therefore more correctly called a moraic writing system, with syllables consisting of two moras corresponding to two kana symbols.

Languages that use syllabaries today tend to have simple phonotactics, with a predominance of monomoraic (CV) syllables. For example, the modern Yi script is used to write languages that have no diphthongs or syllable codas; unusually among syllabaries, there is a separate glyph for every consonant-vowel-tone combination (CVT) in the language (apart from one tone which is indicated with a diacritic).

Few syllabaries have glyphs for syllables that are not monomoraic, and those that once did have simplified over time to eliminate that complexity. For example, the Vai syllabary originally had separate glyphs for syllables ending in a coda (doŋ), a long vowel (soo), or a diphthong (bai), though not enough glyphs to distinguish all CV combinations (some distinctions were ignored). The modern script has been expanded to cover all moras, but at the same time reduced to exclude all other syllables. Bimoraic syllables are now written with two letters, as in Japanese: diphthongs are written with the help of V or hV glyphs, and the nasal codas will be written with the glyph for ŋ, which can form a syllable of its own in Vai.

In Linear B, which was used to transcribe Mycenaean Greek, a language with complex syllables, complex consonant onsets were either written with two glyphs or simplified to one, while codas were generally ignored, e.g., ko-no-so for Κνωσός Knōsos, pe-ma for σπέρμα sperma.

The Cherokee syllabary generally uses dummy vowels for coda consonants, but also has a segmental grapheme for /s/, which can be used both as a coda and in an initial /sC/ consonant cluster.

== Difference from abugidas ==
The languages of India and Southeast Asia, as well as the Ethiopian Semitic languages, have a type of alphabet called an abugida or alphasyllabary. In these scripts, unlike in pure syllabaries, syllables starting with the same consonant are largely expressed with graphemes regularly based on common graphical elements. Usually each character representing a syllable consists of several elements which designate the individual sounds of that syllable.

In the 19th century these systems were called syllabics, a term which has survived in the name of Canadian Aboriginal syllabics (also an abugida).

In a true syllabary there may be graphic similarity between characters that share a common consonant or vowel sound, but it is not systematic or at all regular. For example, the characters for ka ke ko in Japanese hiragana – か け こ – have no similarity to indicate their common /k/ sound. Compare this with Devanagari script, an abugida, where the characters for ka ke ko are क के को respectively.

== Comparison to alphabets ==
English, along with many other Indo-European languages like German and Russian, allows for complex syllable structures, making it cumbersome to write English words with a syllabary. A "pure" English syllabary would require over 10,000 separate glyphs for each possible syllable (e.g., separate glyphs for "half" and "have"). However, such pure systems are rare. A workaround to this problem, common to several syllabaries around the world (including English loanwords in Japanese), is to add a paragogic dummy vowel, as if the syllable coda were a second syllable: ha-fu for "half" and ha-vu for "have".

The Korean script Hangul has been described as a syllabic alphabet as it combines the features of alphabetic and syllabic writing systems. Korean letters are written in syllabic blocks with the alphabetic letters arranged in two dimensions. For example, Seoul is written as 서울, not ㅅㅓㅇㅜㄹ.

== See also ==
- List of syllabaries
