= William O. Bright =

American linguist (1928–2006)

William Bright
- Born: August 13, 1928; Oxnard, California, United States
- Died: October 15, 2006 (aged 78); Louisville, Colorado, United States
- Known for: Study of linguistics, California Indian languages.

Academic background
- Education: University of California, Berkeley (B.A., Ph.D.)
- Doctoral advisor: Mary Haas

Academic work
- Discipline: Linguistics, Anthropology, Native American Studies, South Asian studies
- Institutions: University of California, Los Angeles, University of Colorado, Boulder
- Notable students: Lyle Campbell, Mangesh V. Nadkarni

William Oliver Bright (August 13, 1928 – October 15, 2006) was an American linguist and toponymist who specialized in Native American and South Asian languages and descriptive linguistics.

== Biography ==
Bright earned a bachelor's degree in linguistics in 1949 and a doctorate in the same field in 1955, both from the University of California, Berkeley. He was a professor of linguistics and anthropology at UCLA from 1959 to 1988. He then moved to the University of Colorado at Boulder, where he remained on the faculty until his death.

Bright was an authority on the native languages and cultures of California, and was especially known for his work on Karuk, a Native American language from northwestern California. His study of the language was the first carried out under the auspices of the Survey of California and Other Indian Languages. He was made an honorary member of the Karuk tribe—the first outsider to be so honored—in recognition of his efforts to document and preserve their language which led to its revival. Bright was also known for his research on the Native American languages Nahuatl, Kaqchikel, Luiseño, Ute, Wishram, and Yurok, and the South Asian languages Lushai, Kannada, Tamil, and Tulu. Of particular note are his toponymic contributions to knowledge about Native American place-names and their linguistic importance for tribes and California bands.

Bright was editor of Language, the journal of the Linguistic Society of America, from 1966 to 1988 and of Language in Society from 1993 to 1999. He was the founding editor of Written Language and Literacy, which he edited from 1997 until 2003. He served as president of the Linguistic Society of America in 1989.

== Personal life ==
Bright was born in Oxnard, California. He was the father of author Susie Bright, grandfather of Aretha Bright, and father of the mathematician and philosopher Stephen Menn. From 1986, he was married to fellow linguist Lise Menn. He died of a brain tumor.

== Bibliography ==
- Native American Placenames of the United States (University of Oklahoma, 2004)
- 1,500 California Place Names: Their Origin and Meaning (University of California, 1998)
- The World's Writing Systems (co-editor with Peter T. Daniels) (Oxford University Press, 1996)
- A Coyote Reader (University of California, 1993)
- International Encyclopedia of Linguistics (editor) (Oxford University Press, 1992)
- Language variation in South Asia (Oxford University Press, 1990)
- American Indian Linguistics and Literature (Mouton, 1984)
- Discovered tongues: Poems by linguists (editor) (Corvine Press, 1983)
- Haiku journey: To the North Coast (Copper Canyon Press, 1983)
- Bibliography of the languages of Native California, including closely related languages of adjacent areas (Scarecrow Press, 1982)
