= Peter T. Daniels =

American linguist (born 1951)

- Born: December 11, 1951 (age 74)
- Occupations: Scholar; lecturer

Academic background
- Education: Cornell University; University of Chicago

Academic work
- Institutions: University of Wisconsin–Milwaukee; Chicago State University
- Notable works: The World's Writing Systems (1996)

Peter T. Daniels (born December 11, 1951) is an American linguist best known for his research of writing systems, specializing in the typology of writing systems. He was co-editor (with William Bright) of the book The World's Writing Systems (1996). He was a lecturer at University of Wisconsin–Milwaukee and Chicago State University.

He received degrees in linguistics from Cornell University and the University of Chicago.

Daniels introduced two neologisms for categories of scripts, first published in 1990: abjad (an "alphabet" with no vowel letters, derived from the Arabic term) and abugida (a system of consonant+vowel base syllables modified to denote other or no vowels, derived from the Ethiopic term per a suggestion from Wolf Leslau).

== Bibliography ==
- 1983 translation: Gotthelf Bergsträsser. Introduction to the Semitic Languages: Text specimens and grammatical sketches. Eisenbrauns, Warsaw, Indiana.
- 1990 Fundamentals of grammatology. Journal of the American Oriental Society.
- 1991 Is a structural grammatology possible? In LACUS Forum 1991. Linguistic Association of Canada and the United States.
- 1991 Ha, La, Ha or Hoi, Lawe, Haut: The Ethiopic letter names. In Semitic studies : in honor of Wolf Leslau on the occasion of his eighty-fifth birthday, November 14th, 1991. Alan Kaye, ed. Harrassowitz.
- 1992 The Syllabic Origin of Writing and the Segmental Origin of the Alphabet. In Linguistics of Literacy, edited by Downing, Lima, and Noonan. John Benjamins, Amsterdam.
- 1993 Linguistics in the American library classification systems. In LACUS Forum 1993. Linguistic Association of Canada and the United States.
- 1994 An overlooked ethological datum bearing on the evolution of human language. In LACUS Forum 1994. Linguistic Association of Canada and the United States.
- 1995 translation: Gotthelf Bergsträsser. Introduction to the Semitic Languages: Text specimens and grammatical sketches. Second edition. Eisenbrauns, Warsaw, Indiana. ISBN 0-931464-10-2
- 1996 editor (with William Bright): The World's Writing Systems. Oxford University Press. ISBN 0-19-507993-0
- 1997 Surveys of languages of the world. In Fs. William Bright. de Gruyter.
- 1997 The Protean Arabic Abjad. In Fs. George Krotkoff. Eisenbrauns, Warsaw, Indiana
- 1997 Classical Syriac phonology. In Phonologies of Asia and Africa, edited by Kaye. Eisenbrauns, Warsaw, Indiana.
- 2002 translation: Pierre Briant. From Cyrus to Alexander. A History of the Persian Empire. Eisenbrauns, Warsaw, Indiana. ISBN 1-57506-031-0
- 2006. On beyond alphabets. In Script Adjustment and Phonological Awareness, edited by Martin Neef and Guido Nottbusch. Written Language & Literacy. 9(1): 7–24. ISSN 1387-6732
- 2007. Littera ex occidente: toward a functional history of writing. In Studies in Semitic and Afroasiatic Linguistics Presented to Gene B. Gragg, Cynthia L. Miller, ed, pp. 53–68. Chicago: University of Chicago Press.
- 2008. Grammatology. In Cambridge Handbook of Literacy David R. Olson and Nancy Torrance, (eds.), 25–45. Cambridge: Cambridge University Press.
- 2013. Peter T., Daniels (2013-08-01). "Alphabet, Origin Of". In Khan, Geoffrey (ed.). Encyclopedia of Hebrew Language and Linguistics. Vol. 1. Leiden: Brill. p. 87. ISBN 978-90-04-17642-3. Archived from the original on 2023-04-12.
- 2018. An Exploration of Writing. Sheffield: Equinox Publishing. ISBN 9781781795286
- 2020. "The Decipherment of Ancient Near Eastern Languages." A Companion to Ancient Near Eastern Languages 1-25.
- 2020. "Writing and writing systems: Classification of scripts." The International Encyclopedia of Linguistic Anthropology 1–11.
- 2021. "Foundations of graphonomy." Journal of Cultural Cognitive Science 5, no. 2: 113–123.
- 2021. "Hebrew script for Jewish languages: A unique phenomenon." Written Language & Literacy 24, no. 1: 149–165.
