= Stephen Menn =

American philosopher (born 1964)

Stephen Philip Menn
- Born: 1964 (age 61–62)

Academic background
- Education: Johns Hopkins University (PhD) (Mathematics); University of Chicago (PhD) (Philosophy)
- Theses: Total Foliations on 3-Manifolds and the Geometry of Spaces of Coframefields (1985); Descartes and Augustine (1989)
- Doctoral advisor: Daniel Garber (philosopher)

Academic work
- Era: Contemporary philosophy
- Region: Western philosophy
- Institutions: University of Toronto; McGill University; Humboldt University of Berlin; Princeton University
- Website: https://philosophy.utoronto.ca/directory/stephen-menn/

Stephen Philip Menn (born 1964) is a fellow of the Royal Society of Canada and a professor of philosophy at the University of Toronto, Humboldt University of Berlin, and McGill University. He is the inaugural holder of the Michael and Virginia Walsh Chair in the History of Philosophy at the University of Toronto, and a James McGill Professor at McGill University.

His specialties include ancient philosophy, medieval philosophy, as well as the history and of philosophy mathematics.

== Life ==
Menn is the son of linguist Lise Menn, the widow of William Bright, and is the step-brother of writer Susie Bright.

He holds two doctorate degrees: one in Philosophy conferred by the University of Chicago in 1989; and the other in mathematics, conferred by Johns Hopkins University in 1985.

He has an Erdős number of 3.

Menn joined University of Toronto in 2025. He taught at Princeton University from 1989 to 1992, joining McGill University in 1992. Between 2011 and 2015 he was Professor of Ancient and Contemporary Philosophy at Humboldt University of Berlin, where he maintains the status of honorary professor.

== Books ==
- Menn, Stephen. Plato on God As Nous. Carbondale: Southern Illinois University Press, 1995. ISBN 978-0-585-02970-2
- Menn, Stephen. Descartes and Augustine, Cambridge University Press, 1998; revised paperback edition, 2002
- Menn, Stephen. The Aim and the Argument of Aristotle's Metaphysics (draft).

== See also ==
- Stoic categories
- List of American philosophers
