= David Diringer =

British linguist (1900–1975)

- Born: 16 June 1900; Tlumacz, Austria-Hungary
- Died: 13 February 1975 (aged 74); Cambridge, England, UK
- Education: University of Florence; University of Cambridge
- Occupations: Linguist; palaeographer; writer

David Diringer (16 June 1900 – 13 February 1975) was a British linguist, palaeographer and writer. He was the author of several well-known books about writing systems.

== Biography ==
Diringer was born to Jacob Munzer and Mirl Diringer on 16 June 1900, in Tlumacz – at that time considered part of Austria, later Poland, but now Tlumach, Ukraine. He stayed in Tlumacz through high school but moved to Italy to earn, in 1927, his Doctor of Literature degree from the University of Florence. This was followed, in 1929, by a diploma in ancient history. He was appointed a professor at Florence (1931–1933), his first academic interest being the culture of the Etruscans. He did excavations in Tuscany from 1930 to 1939.

As anti-Jewish policies were put in place in Italy, he moved to England in 1939. His two brothers who remained in Tlumacz were both lost in the holocaust. In England he was at first, as an Italian citizen, interned on the Isle of Man as an "enemy alien." But he was released in November 1940 and actually then worked for the British Foreign Office.

After the war, he lectured in Semitic epigraphy at Cambridge University, establishing the Alphabet Museum there. It was while at Cambridge that he published most of his works on writing and writing systems. Three years before his death, he moved the Alphabet Museum to Tel Aviv, where he had a second residence.

When his magnum opus, The Alphabet: A Key to the History of Mankind, was published in 1948, it was greeted with effusive praise. In reviewing the book, Thomas Sebeok enthused: "There are few comprehensive studies on this subject in the English language since Isaac Taylor's fundamental contribution in 1883. But this book does much more than merely fill a gap: it is bound to stand as the most authoritative treatment of the history of alphabetic writing for a long time to come. This is because the book is extraordinarily scholarly and exhaustive. It is, incidentally, also quite exciting to read." William F. Albright had this to say in his review: "This great work ... will certainly displace all other books in its field for some time to come, at least for librarians and general readers. It contains an extraordinary mass of material in over 600 compactly printed pages...."

Diringer died in Cambridge, England, an emeritus professor at Cambridge, on 13 February 1975 and was survived by his wife Elena (née Cecchini), and daughter Kedma.

The following biography appears on the back dust-jacket flap of Writing (1962):

David Diringer, M.A. (Cantab.), D.Litt. (Florence), was educated in Florence, to which University he subsequently returned, first as Lecturer, then as Professor. He has taught [...] in England, on the Continent, in the [US], and elsewhere. He was Secretary at the First International Congress of Etruscan Studies (1928) and at the first three Congresses of Colonial Studies in Italy (1931, 1934, 1937). Since 1948, Dr. Diringer has been Lecturer in Semitic Epigraphy at the University of Cambridge. He is the author of several books, including The Early Hebrew Inscriptions (1934) [and] The Alphabet in the History of Civilization (1937), and of more than 200 contributions to learned journals. Dr. Diringer is the founder and director of the Alphabet Museum at Cambridge.

See also his obituary in the (London) Times 19 February 1975

== Bibliography ==
- The Alphabet: A Key to the History of Mankind; ISBN 81-215-0748-0
- History of the Alphabet, 1977; ISBN 0-905418-12-3
- The Book Before Printing: Ancient, Medieval and Oriental. New York: Dover Publications. 1982. ISBN 0-486-24243-9.
- The Alphabet, ISBN 0-09-067642-4
- The Illuminated Book; ISBN 0-571-08077-4
- Writing [Its Origins and Early History], 1962. New York: Praeger (Volume 25 in the series, Ancient Peoples and Places)
- The Story of the Aleph Beth, 1958
- The Hand-produced Book. New York: Philosophical Library, 1953.
