= Writing system =

Convention of symbols representing language

A writing system is or was a writing scheme that uses visual symbols (called graphemes and scripts) plus spelling and layout rules (orthography) to represent in written form a spoken language. A particular script may be used to represent more than one language. For example, the Latin script is used, with some modifications, by many languages. Also, it is not unusual for the same language to modify its associated writing system or adopt another writing system.

The earliest writing systems appeared during the late 4th millennium BC. Historically, each independently invented writing system gradually emerged from a hypothetical system of proto-writing, where a small number of ideographs were used in a manner incapable of fully encoding a language, and thus limiting the ability to express a broad range of ideas.

Writing systems are generally classified according to how their symbols, called graphemes, relate to units of language. Phonetic writing systems – which include alphabets and syllabaries – use graphemes that correspond to sounds in the corresponding spoken language. Alphabets use graphemes called letters that generally correspond to spoken phonemes. They are typically divided into three sub-types: Pure alphabets use letters to represent both consonant and vowel sounds, abjads generally only use letters representing consonant sounds, and abugidas use letters representing consonant–vowel pairs. Syllabaries use graphemes called syllabograms that represent entire syllables or moras. By contrast, logographic (or morphographic) writing systems use graphemes that represent the units of meaning in a language, such as its words or morphemes. Alphabets typically use fewer than 100 distinct symbols, while syllabaries and logographies may use hundreds or thousands, respectively.

== Background: relationship with language ==
The relationship between spoken, written, and signed modes of language, as modelled by Meletis & Dürscheid (2022) While many spoken or signed languages are not written, there are no written languages without a spoken counterpart that they originally emerged to record.

According to most contemporary definitions, writing is a visual and tactile notation of a spoken language. As such, the use of writing by a community presupposes an analysis of the structure of language at some level. The symbols used in writing correspond systematically to functional units of either a spoken or signed language. This definition excludes a broader class of symbolic markings, such as drawings and maps. (Note: This view is sometimes called the "narrow definition" of writing. The "broad definition" of writing also includes semasiography – i.e. meaningful symbols without a direct relationship to language.) A text is any instance of written material, including transcriptions of spoken material. The act of composing and recording a text is referred to as writing, and the act of viewing and interpreting the text as reading.

The relationship between writing and language more broadly has been the subject of philosophical analysis as early as Aristotle (384–322 BC). While the use of language is universal across human societies, writing is not; writing emerged much more recently, and was independently invented in only a handful of locations throughout history. While most spoken languages have not been written, all written languages have been predicated on an existing spoken language. When those with signed languages as their first language read writing associated with a spoken language, this functions as literacy in a second, acquired language. (Note: This is to be distinguished from the use of notation systems designed to record signed languages, such as SignWriting.) A single language (e.g. Hindustani) can be written using multiple writing systems, and a writing system can also represent multiple languages. For example, Chinese characters have been used to write multiple languages throughout the Sinosphere – including the Vietnamese language from at least the 13th century, until their replacement with the Latin-based Vietnamese alphabet in the 20th century.

In the first several decades of modern linguistics as a scientific discipline, linguists often characterized writing as merely the technology used to record speech – which was treated as being of paramount importance, for what was seen as the unique potential for its study to further the understanding of human cognition.

== General terminology ==
Comparison between double-storey |a| (left) and single-storey |ɑ| (right) lowercase forms of the Latin letter ⟨A⟩

While researchers of writing systems generally use some of the same core terminology, precise definitions and interpretations can vary by author, often depending on their theoretical approach.

A grapheme is the basic functional unit of a writing system. Graphemes are generally defined as minimally significant elements that, when taken together, comprise the set of symbols from which texts may be constructed. All writing systems require a set of defined graphemes, collectively called a script. The concept of the grapheme is similar to that of the phoneme in the study of spoken languages. Likewise, as many sonically distinct phones may function as the same phoneme depending on the speaker, dialect, and context, many visually distinct glyphs (or graphs) may be identified as the same grapheme. These variant glyphs are known as the allographs of a grapheme: For example, the lowercase letter ⟨a⟩ may be represented by the double-storey |a| and single-storey |ɑ| shapes, or others written in cursive, block, or printed styles. The choice of a particular allograph may be influenced by the medium used, the writing instrument used, the stylistic choice of the writer, the preceding and succeeding graphemes in the text, the time available for writing, the intended audience, and the largely unconscious features of an individual's handwriting.

Orthography (lit. 'correct writing') refers to the rules and conventions for writing shared by a community, including the ordering of and relationship between graphemes. Particularly for alphabets, orthography includes the concept of spelling. For example, English orthography includes uppercase and lowercase forms for 26 letters of the Latin alphabet (with these graphemes corresponding to various phonemes), punctuation marks (mostly non-phonemic), and other symbols, such as numerals. Writing systems may be regarded as complete if they are able to represent all that may be expressed in the spoken language, while a partial writing system cannot represent the spoken language in its entirety.

== History ==
Diagram comparing the abstraction of pictographs in cuneiform, Egyptian hieroglyphs, and Chinese characters – from an 1870 publication by French Egyptologist Gaston Maspero

In each instance, writing emerged from systems of proto-writing, though historically most proto-writing systems did not produce writing systems. Proto-writing uses ideographic and mnemonic symbols to communicate, but lacks the capability to fully encode language. Examples include:

- The Jiahu symbols (c. 7th millennium BC) carved into tortoise shells, found in 24 Neolithic graves excavated at Jiahu in northern China.
- The Vinča symbols (c. 6th–5th millennia BC) found on artefacts of the Vinča culture of Central and Southeast Europe.
- Quipu (15th century AD), a system of knotted cords used as mnemonic devices by the Inca Empire in South America.

Writing has been invented independently multiple times in human history – first emerging as cuneiform, a system initially used to write the Sumerian language in southern Mesopotamia; it was later adapted to write Akkadian as its speakers spread throughout the region, with Akkadian writing appearing in significant quantities c. 2350 BC. Cuneiform was closely followed by Egyptian hieroglyphs. It is generally agreed that the two systems were invented independently from one another; both evolved from proto-writing systems between 3400 and 3100 BC, with the earliest coherent texts dated c. 2600 BC. Chinese characters emerged independently in the Yellow River valley c. 1200 BC. There is no evidence of contact between China and the literate peoples of the Near East, and the Mesopotamian and Chinese approaches for representing sound and meaning are distinct. The Mesoamerican writing systems, including Olmec and the Maya script, are likewise associated with an independent invention.

With each independent invention of writing, the ideographs used in proto-writing were decoupled from the direct representation of ideas, and gradually came to represent words instead. This occurred via application of the rebus principle, where a symbol was appropriated to represent an additional word that happened to be similar in pronunciation to the word for the idea originally represented by the symbol. This allowed words without concrete visualizations to be represented by symbols for the first time; the gradual shift from ideographic symbols to those wholly representing language took place over centuries, and required the conscious analysis of a given language by those attempting to write it.

The Indus script (c. 2600 – c. 2000 BC), found on different types of artefacts produced by the Indus Valley Civilization on the Indian subcontinent, remains undeciphered, and whether it functioned as true writing is not agreed upon.

Alphabetic writing descends from previous morphographic writing, and first appeared c. 1800 BC to write a Semitic language spoken in the Sinai Peninsula. Most of the world's alphabets either descend directly from this Proto-Sinaitic script, or were directly inspired by its design. Descendants include the Phoenician alphabet (c. 1050 BC), and its child in the Greek alphabet (c. 800 BC). The Latin alphabet, which descended from the Greek alphabet, is by far the most common script used by writing systems.

== Classification by basic linguistic unit ==
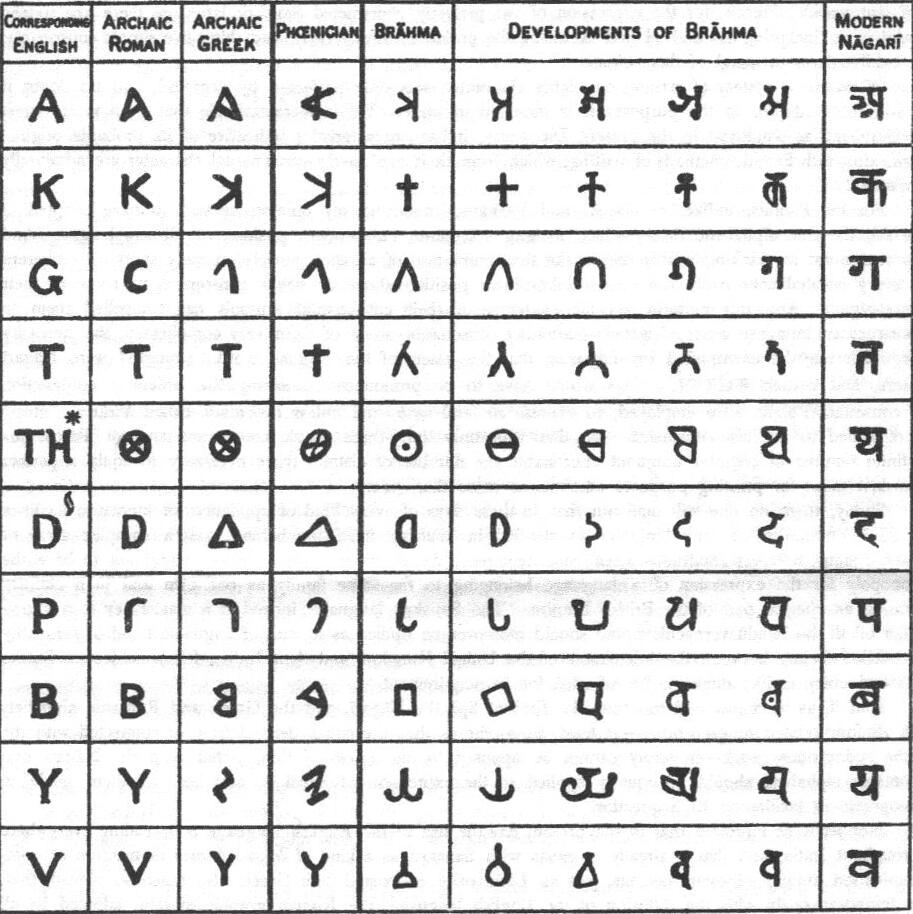
Table of scripts in the introduction to the Sanskrit–English Dictionary by Monier Monier-Williams

Writing systems are most often classified according to what units of language a system's graphemes correspond to. At the most basic level, writing systems can be either phonographic (lit. 'sound writing') when graphemes represent units of sound in a language, or morphographic ('form writing') when graphemes represent units of meaning (such as words or morphemes). Depending on the author, the older term logographic ('word writing') is often used, either with the same meaning as morphographic, or specifically in reference to systems where the basic unit being written is the word. Recent scholarship generally prefers morphographic over logographic, with the latter seen as potentially vague or misleading – in part because systems usually operate on the level of morphemes, not words. Some authors make a distinct primary division – between pleremic (from Greek plḗrēs 'full') systems with graphemes that have semantic value in isolation (like logographs), and cenemic (from Greek kenós 'empty') systems with graphemes that lack any such separable meaning (like letters).

Many classifications define three primary categories, where phonographic systems are subdivided into syllabic and alphabetic (or segmental) systems. Syllabaries use symbols called syllabograms to represent syllables or moras. Alphabets use symbols called letters that correspond to spoken phonemes (or more technically, to diaphonemes). Alphabets are generally classified into three subtypes, with abjads having letters for consonants, pure alphabets having letters for both consonants and vowels, and abugidas having characters that correspond to consonant–vowel pairs. David Diringer proposed a five-fold classification of writing systems, comprising pictographic scripts, ideographic scripts, analytic transitional scripts, phonetic scripts, and alphabetic scripts.

In practice, writing systems are classified according to the primary type of symbols used, and typically include exceptional cases where symbols function differently. For example, logographs found within phonetic systems like English include the ampersand ⟨&⟩ and the numerals ⟨0⟩, ⟨1⟩, etc. – which correspond to specific words (and, zero, one, etc.) and not to the underlying sounds. Most writing systems can be described as mixed systems that feature elements of both phonography and morphography.

=== Logographic systems ===
A logogram is a character that represents a morpheme within a language. Chinese characters represent the only major logographic writing systems still in use: they have historically been used to write the varieties of Chinese, as well as Japanese, Korean, Vietnamese, and other languages of the Sinosphere. As each character represents a single unit of meaning, thousands are required to write all the words of a language. If the logograms do not adequately represent all meanings and words of a language, written language can be confusing or ambiguous to the reader.

Logograms are sometimes conflated with ideograms, symbols which graphically represent abstract ideas; most linguists now reject this characterization. Chinese characters are often semantic–phonetic compounds, which include a component related to the character's meaning, and a component that gives a hint for its pronunciation.

=== Syllabaries ===
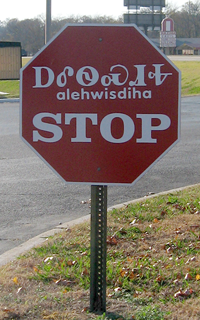
A stop sign in Tahlequah, Oklahoma written in Cherokee using both the Cherokee syllabary (top) and Latin alphabet (middle), alongside English (bottom)

A syllabary is a set of written symbols (called syllabograms) that represent either syllables or moras – a unit of prosody that is often but not always a syllable in length. Syllabaries are best suited to languages with relatively simple syllable structure, since a different symbol is needed for every syllable. For example, the Japanese writing system has two kana syllabaries (hiragana and katakana) intended for use in distinct circumstances; both have syllabograms for each of the roughly 100 moras found in Japanese. By contrast, English features complex syllable structures, with a relatively large inventory of vowels and complex consonant clusters – for a total of 15–16 thousand distinct syllables. Some syllabaries have larger inventories: the Yi script contains 756 different symbols.

=== Alphabets ===
An alphabet uses symbols (called letters) that correspond to the phonemes of a language, e.g. its vowels and consonants. However, these correspondences are rarely uncomplicated, and spelling is often mediated by other factors than just which sounds are used by a speaker. The word alphabet is derived from alpha and beta, the names for the first two letters in the Greek alphabet.

An abjad is an alphabet whose letters only represent the consonantal sounds of a language. They were the first alphabets to develop historically, with most used to write Semitic languages, and originally deriving from the Proto-Sinaitic script. The morphology of Semitic languages is particularly suited to this approach, as the denotation of vowels is generally redundant. Optional markings for vowels may be used for some abjads, but are generally limited to applications like education. Many pure alphabets were derived from abjads through the addition of dedicated vowel letters, as with the derivation of the Greek alphabet from the Phoenician alphabet c. 800 BC. Abjad is the word for "alphabet" in Arabic, and analogously derives from the traditional order of letters in the Arabic alphabet ('alif, bā', jīm, dāl).

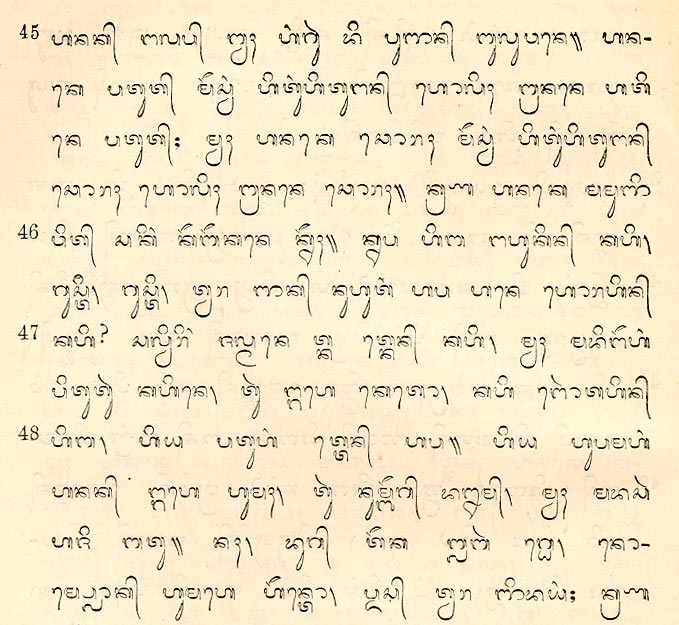
A passage from the biblical Gospel of Luke printed using Balinese script

An abugida is a type of alphabet with symbols corresponding to consonant–vowel pairs, where basic symbols for each consonant are associated with an inherent vowel by default, and other possible vowels for each consonant are indicated via predictable modifications made to the basic symbols. In an abugida, there may be a sign for k with no vowel, but also one for ka (if a is the inherent vowel), and ke is written by modifying the ka sign in a way consistent with how la would be modified to get le. In many abugidas, modification consists of the addition of a vowel sign; other possibilities include rotation of the basic sign, or addition of diacritics.

While true syllabaries have one symbol per syllable and no systematic visual similarity, the graphic similarity in most abugidas stems from their origins as abjads – with added symbols comprising markings for different vowels added onto a pre-existing base symbol. The largest single group of abugidas is the Brahmic family of scripts, however, which includes nearly all the scripts used in India and Southeast Asia. The name abugida was derived by linguist Peter T. Daniels (b. 1951) from the first four characters of an order of the Geʽez script, which is used for certain Nilo-Saharan and Afro-Asiatic languages of Ethiopia and Eritrea.

=== Featural systems ===
Originally proposed as a category by Geoffrey Sampson, a featural system uses symbols representing sub-phonetic elements – e.g. those traits that can be used to distinguish between and analyse a language's phonemes, such as their voicing or place of articulation. The only prominent example of a featural system is the Hangul script used to write Korean, where featural symbols are combined into letters, which are in turn joined into syllabic blocks. Many scholars, including John DeFrancis, reject a characterization of Hangul as a featural system – with arguments including that Korean writers do not themselves think in these terms when writing – or question the viability of Sampson's category altogether.

As Hangul was consciously created by literate experts, Daniels characterizes it as a "sophisticated grammatogeny" – a writing system intentionally designed for a specific purpose, as opposed to having evolved gradually over time. Other featural grammatogenies include shorthands developed by professionals and constructed scripts created by hobbyists and creatives, like the Tengwar script designed by J. R. R. Tolkien to write the Elven languages he also constructed. Many of these feature advanced graphic designs corresponding to phonological properties. The basic unit of writing in these systems can map to anything from phonemes to words. It has been shown that even the Latin script has sub-character features in its lowercase letters.

== Classification by graphical properties ==
=== Linearity ===
All writing is linear in the broadest sense – i.e., the spatial arrangement of symbols indicates the order in which they should be read. On a more granular level, systems with discontinuous marks like diacritics can be characterized as less linear than those without. In the initial historical distinction, linear writing systems (e.g. the Phoenician alphabet) generally form glyphs as a series of connected lines or strokes, while systems that generally use discrete, more pictorial marks (e.g. cuneiform) are sometimes termed non-linear. The historical abstraction of logographs into phonographs is often associated with a linearization of the script.

In Braille, raised bumps on the writing substrate are used to encode non-linear symbols. The original system – which Louis Braille (1809–1852) invented in order to allow people with visual impairments to read and write – used characters that corresponded to the letters of the Latin alphabet. Moreover, that Braille is equivalent to visual writing systems in function demonstrates that the phenomenon of writing is fundamentally spatial in nature, not merely visual.

=== Directionality and orientation ===
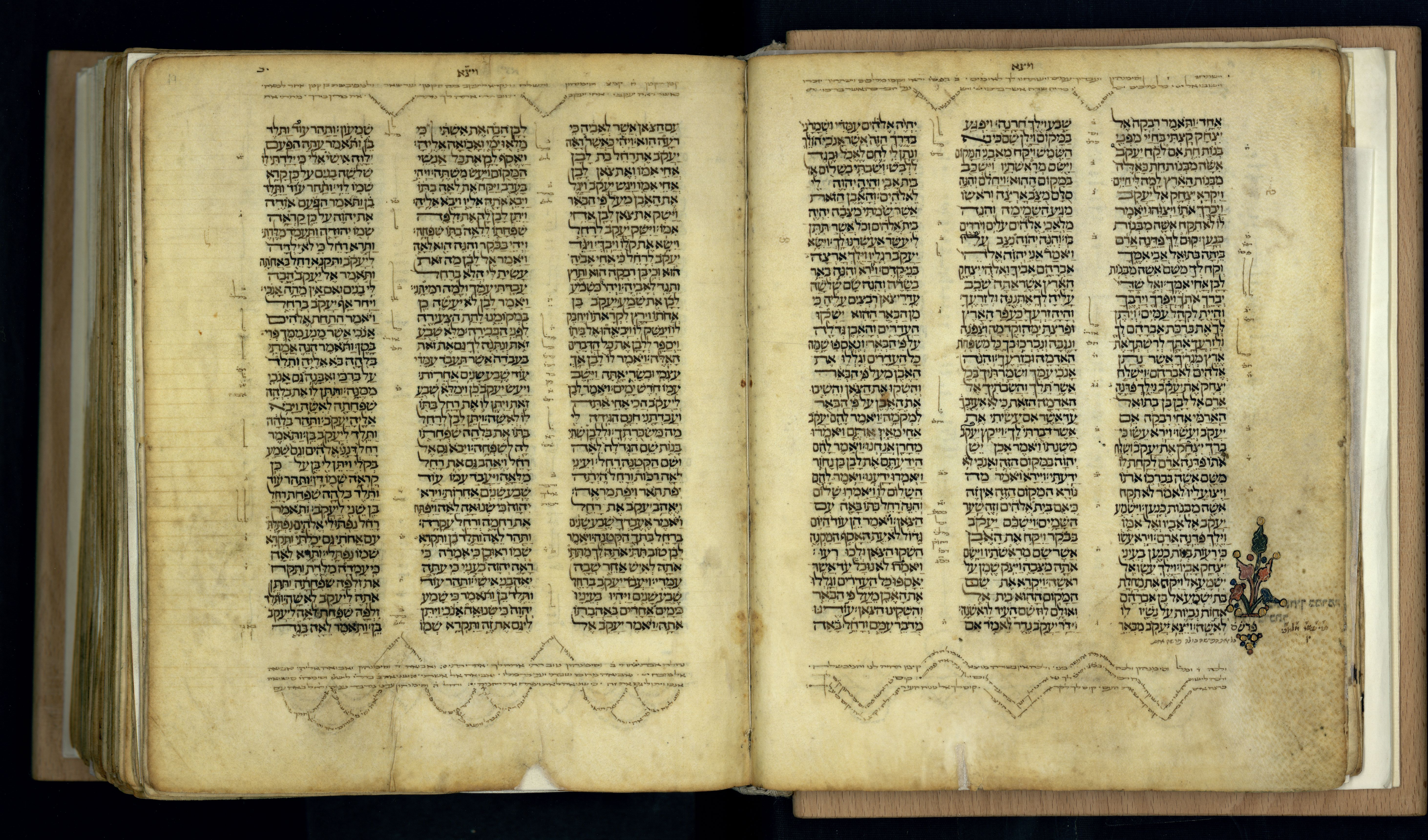
The Book of Genesis written in the Hebrew alphabet. Text is rendered from right-to-left in descending lines across each column, which pan the same direction.

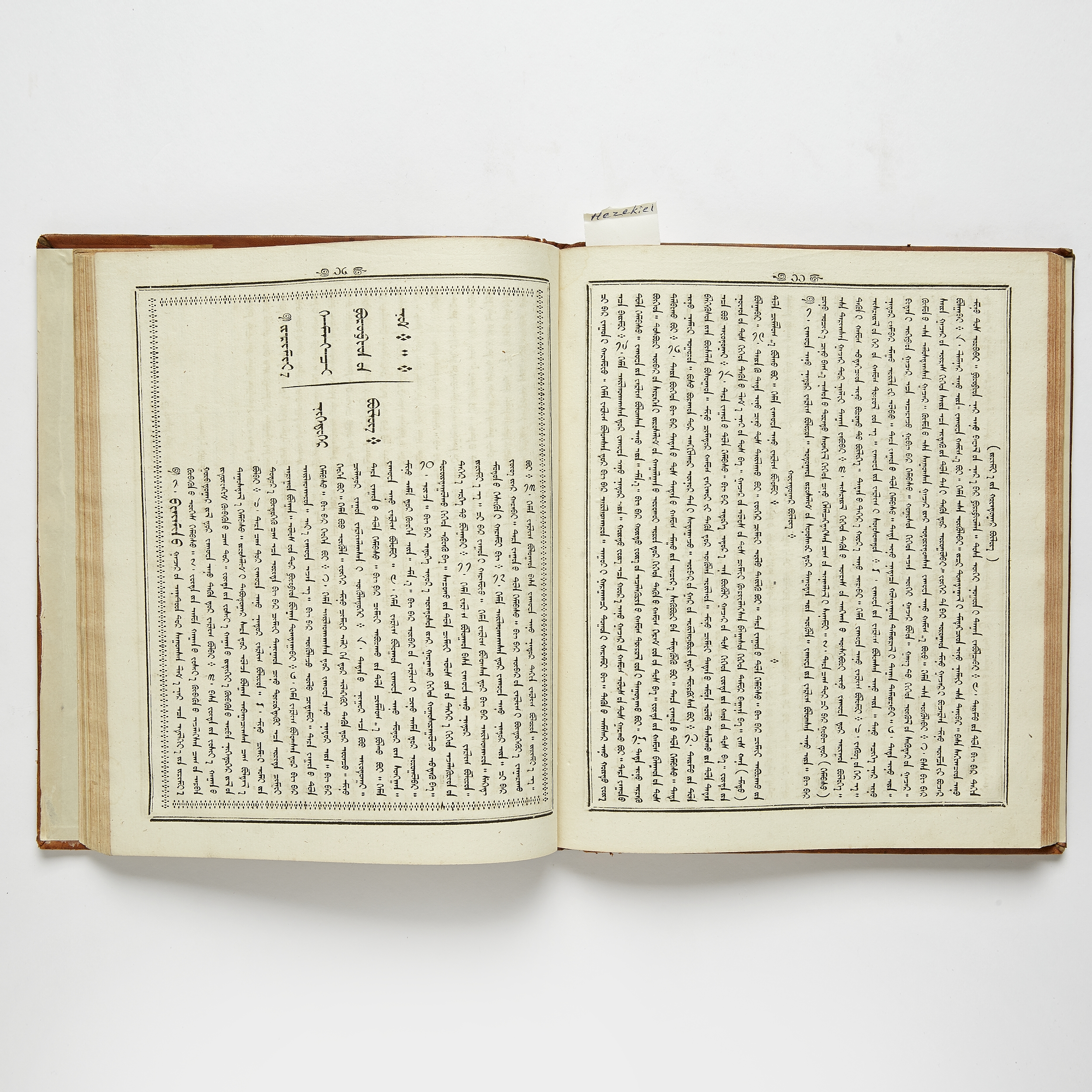
The Book of Jeremiah written in Mongolian script. Text is rendered from top-to-bottom in columns panning left-to-right.

Writing systems may be characterized by how text is graphically divided into lines, which are to be read in sequence:

Axis
Whether lines of text are laid out as horizontal rows or vertical columns
Lining
How each line is positioned relative to the one previous on the medium – in practice only vertical scripts vary whether columns are read in a left- or rightward order, as all horizontal scripts sequence rows from top to bottom
Directionality
How individual lines are read – whether starting from the left or right on a horizontal axis, or from the top or bottom on a vertical axis

In left-to-right scripts (LTR), horizontal rows are sequenced from top to bottom on a page, with each row read from left to right. Right-to-left scripts (RTL), which use the opposite directionality, include the Arabic alphabet.

Egyptian hieroglyphs were written either left-to-right or right-to-left, with the animal and human glyphs turned to face the beginning of the line. The early alphabet did not have a fixed direction, and was written both vertically and horizontally; it was most commonly written boustrophedonically: starting in one horizontal direction, then turning at the end of the line and reversing direction.

The right-to-left direction of the Phoenician alphabet initially stabilized after c. 800 BC. Left-to-right writing has an advantage that, since most people are right-handed, the hand does not interfere with what is being written (which, when inked, may not have dried yet) as the hand is to the right side of the pen. The Greek alphabet and its successors settled on a left-to-right pattern, from the top to the bottom of the page. Other scripts, such as Arabic and Hebrew, came to be written right to left. Scripts that historically incorporate Chinese characters have traditionally been written vertically in columns arranged from right to left, while a horizontal direction from left to right was only widely adopted in the 20th century due to Western influence. The Mongolian script is written vertically, top-to-bottom, with columns arranged left to right.

Several scripts used in the Philippines and Indonesia, such as Hanunoo, are traditionally written with lines moving away from the writer, from bottom to top, but are read left to right; ogham is written from bottom to top, commonly on the corner of a stone. The ancient Libyco-Berber alphabet was also written from bottom to top.

== Orthographic regularity and depth ==
Polygraphy in English
Phoneme	Grapheme	Example
/eɪ/	⟨e⟩	fiancé
/eɪ/	⟨ai⟩	raid
/eɪ/	⟨ay⟩	bay
/eɪ/	⟨ea⟩	steak
/eɪ/	⟨ei⟩	vein

Polyphony in English
Phoneme	Grapheme	Example
/eɪ/	⟨e⟩	fiancé
/ɛ/	⟨e⟩	red
/i/	⟨e⟩	area
/ə/	⟨e⟩	taken
∅	⟨e⟩	smile

Writing systems, especially alphabets, often include characters that can represent multiple sound values, or conversely sound values that can be represented by multiple characters – this phenomenon is referred to as polyvalence. Orthographies with lower or higher polyvalence are referred to as shallow or deep respectively. While polyvalent graphemes are often perceived as defects, they can serve to distinguish homophonic words, and to indicate etymological or semantic connections between words not clear from pronunciation alone – e.g. between English sign and signal or child and children. Specifically, an orthographic relationship where one grapheme may represent multiple sound values can be termed polyphony, while a relationship where one sound value may be represented by multiple graphemes can be termed polygraphy.

Scholars have increasingly analysed different patterns of phonological spellings versus morphological spellings in a writing system as being better suited depending on the characteristics of the spoken language, with neither principle being ideal in all circumstances. While not adhering strictly to phonological rules, morphological spellings often follow other patterns that allow for transparent identification and parsing by readers and writers.

== See also ==
- Bidirectional text
- Complex text layout (CTL)
- Defective script
- Digraphia
- Epigraphy
- Formal language
- ISO 15924
- Pasigraphy
- Penmanship
- Palaeography
- Script (Unicode)
- Transcription (linguistics)
