= Koleluttu =

Abugida

Kolezhuthu
- Script type: Abugida
- Period: c. 12th/13th century AD
- Direction: Left-to-right
- Languages: Malayalam

Related scripts
- Parent systems: Proto-Sinaitic alphabet: Phoenician alphabet; Aramaic alphabet; Brahmi; Tamil Brahmi; Vattezhuthu; Kolezhuthu

Koleḻuttŭ (Malayalam: കോലെഴുത്ത്, romanized: Kōleḻuttŭ) was a syllabic script historically employed in Kerala, south India, for writing the Malayalam language.

Kolezhuthu developed from the Vattezhuthu (script) during the post-medieval Chera period (c. 12th century onwards) in Kerala. It was used by certain Keralite communities, such as Muslims and Christians, until as late as the 18th century AD.

The Ezhava community historically used the Kolezhuthu script (a Chera-era script) and the Malayalam script. Early Ezhava physicians, known as Vaidyars, used palm-leaf manuscripts written in these scripts to document traditional medicine, botany, and toxicology

The term Kolezhuthu is likely derived from the distinctive type of stylus traditionally used in its inscription. In present-day Malayalam, kōl refers to a stylus or an elongated stick-like object, while eḻuttŭ denotes 'written form'.

== Unicode ==
Not yet added to Unicode, no proposals yet.
