= Vatteluttu =

Abugida used in southern Indian subcontinent (c. 6th–12th centuries)

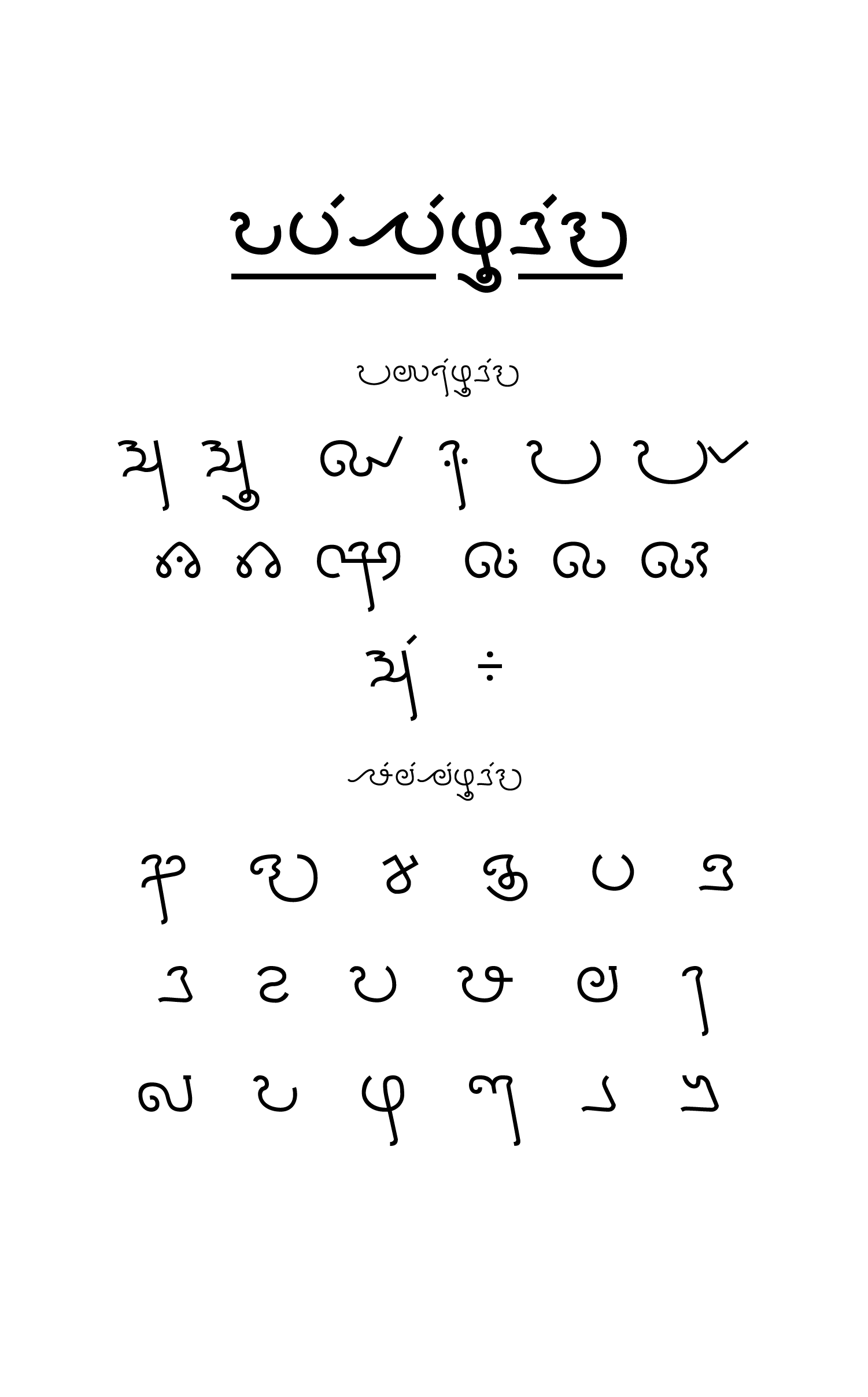
- Vatteluttu Alphabet chart in modern Vatteluttu typeface
- Script type: Abugida
- Direction: Left-to-right
- Languages: Tamil; Malayalam

Related scripts
- Parent systems: Egyptian hieroglyphs: Proto-Sinaitic; Pheonician; Aramaic; Brahmi; Tamil-Brahmi; Vatteluttu
- Child systems: Koleluttu (script); Malayayma/Malayanma
- Sister systems: Pallava-Chola Script

Vatteluttu (Tamil: வட்டெழுத்து, Vaṭṭeḻuttu and Malayalam: വട്ടെഴുത്ത്, Vaṭṭeḻuttŭ, IPA: [ʋɐʈːeɻut̪ːɨ̆]), also transliterated as Vattezhuthu, was an alphasyllabic or syllabic writing system of south India (Tamil Nadu and Kerala) and Sri Lanka formerly employed for writing the Tamil and Malayalam languages. The script is a sister system of the Pallava-Chola alphabet. The script was patronized by the Pallava, Pandya and Chera rulers of southern India.

Vatteluttu belonged to the "southern group" of Brahmi derivatives (Southern Brahmi, generally associated with Dravidian languages of south India). The script was used in inscriptions and manuscripts of south India for centuries. It is closely related to the Tamil script (although it is more cursive than the Tamil script, with letters with a single curvilinear stroke). The direction of writing in Vatteluttu is from left to right. It notably omits the virama vowel muting device.

== Etymology ==
Three possible suggestions for the etymology of the term 'Vatteluttu' are commonly proposed. The term Eḻuttu is literally 'written form' in this context; and affixed here it means 'writing system' or 'script'.

The three suggestions are:

- Vatte + eluttu; 'rounded script'
- Vata + eluttu; 'northern script'
- Vette + eluttu; 'chiseled script'

=== Alternate names ===
The Vatteluttu script was also known as "Tekken-Malayalam" (literally, "Southern Malayalam") or "Nana-mona". The name "Nana-mona" is given to it because, at the time when script is taught, the words "namostu" etc. are begun, which are spelt "nana, mona, ittanna, tuva" (that is, "na, mo and tu"), and the writing system therefore came to be known as the "nana-mona" alphabet.

== History ==
=== Early Vatteluttu ===
Vatteluttu script started developing from Tamil-Brahmi Script (the late Tamil-Brahmi, 2nd–4th centuries AD), from around the 4th or 5th century AD. This early form is thus sometimes described as a "a transitional variety" of the Tamil-Brahmi Script.

The Vatteluttu script of 5th–6th centuries AD is called "Early Vatteluttu" script. The earliest forms of the script have been traced to memorial stone and rock inscriptions from this period. These include, among others, the famous Pulankurichi rock inscriptions, and numerous inscribed hero stones from Chengam Taluk and the nearby Dharmapuri District in northern Tamil Nadu. Vatteluttu is unambiguously attested in a number of inscriptions in Tamil Nadu from the 6th century AD.

=== Vatteluttu in the middle phase ===
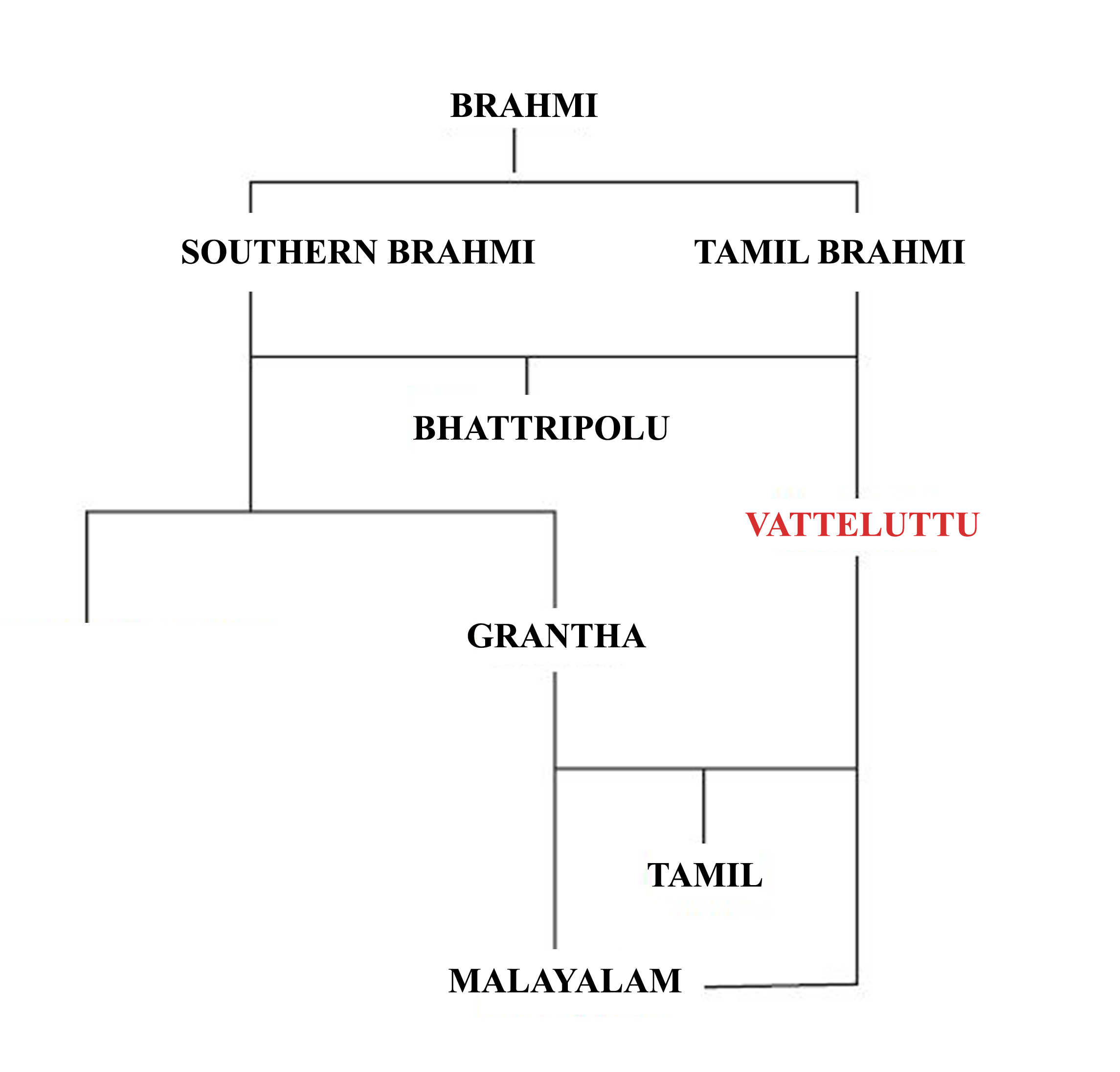
Evolution of Vaṭṭeḻuttu (script)

By the 7th to 8th centuries, Vatteluttu had developed into a completely separate script from the Tamil-Brahmi Script (and was current all over the Tamil country). Some of the inscriptions associated with Pallava rulers from Simhavarman III to Nandivarman (mid-6th to mid-8th century AD) are exclusively in Vatteluttu script. It was also employed by the Pandya and Chera rulers (the later, from mid-9th century in Kerala).

Its use is also attested in north-eastern Sri Lankan rock inscriptions, such as those found near Trincomalee, dated to between c. the 5th and 8th centuries AD.

=== Replacement in the Tamil country ===
Vatteluttu was systematically replaced by the Pallava-Grantha script from the 7th century AD in the Pallava court and territory (by simplifying the Grantha and adding symbols from Vatteluttu). However, it continued to exist in the Ganga country, the Vanakapadi, and the North Kongu country, even though the Grantha-Tamil script was slowly gaining precedence.

The Tamil script supplanted the Vatteluttu in the northern Tamil country from the middle of the 8th century AD. It persisted in the southern Pandya country up to the end of the 10th century (till the Chola conquest of the Pandya country and its integration to the Chola administrative system). From the 11th century AD (the Chola period) onwards the Tamil script displaced the Pallava-Grantha as the principal script for writing Tamil language.

In what is now Kerala, Vatteluttu continued for a much longer period than in Tamil Nadu by incorporating characters from Pallava-Grantha Script to represent Sanskrit or Indo-Aryan loan words in early Malayalam. Early Malayalam inscriptions (mid-9th to early 12th century AD) of the medieval Chera rulers are mostly engraved in Vatteluttu. The script went on continuously evolving in Kerala during this period and from c. the 12th century onwards.

Vatteluttu, in its standard form, is attested in Kerala as late as the 14th century AD. The modern Malayalam script, a modified form of the Pallava-Grantha script, later replaced Vatteluttu for writing the Malayalam language (the Malayalam script had evolved out of Grantha script by the end of the 14th century AD).

=== Legacy ===
Vatteluttu in modern Vatteluttu type

- Vatteluttu gradually developed into a variant script known as "Koleluttu" in Kerala. This script was more commonly used in north Kerala. It continued in use among certain Kerala communities, especially Muslims and Christians, even after the 16th century and up to the 19th century AD.
- Another script derived from Vatteluttu was the "Malayayma" or "Malayanma". This script was more commonly used in southern Kerala. The script is not, however, the one that is ancestral to the modern Malayalam script.
- Some records of the state of Travancore are written in later forms of the Vatteluttu script as late as the 19th century AD.

== Letters ==
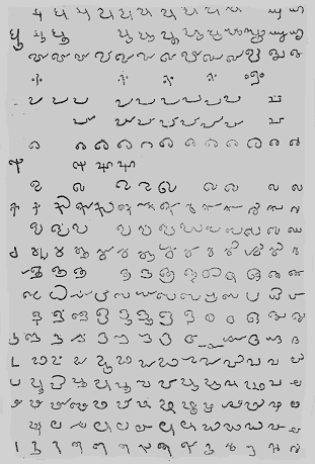
Evolution of Vatteluttu (script)

The script continuously went on evolving during its period of existence (in such a way that the date of a record may be fixed approximately by reference to the script alone).

- Last quarter of the 8th century – the difference between two similar letters, such as for instance between 'p' and 'v'; and 'ṅ' and 'l' etc., was very markedly shown.
- A few centuries later – difficult to distinguish between 'k' and 'c', 'ṅ' and 'l', 'p' and 'v' and so on.
- 17th-18 centuries – letters 'p', 'v', 'y', and 'n' and sometimes 'l' also, are alike.

Vatteluttu	ISO	Equivalent letter in	
Vatteluttu	ISO	Tamil	Malayalam
	a	அ	അ
	ā	ஆ	ആ
	i	இ	ഇ
	u	உ	ഉ
	e	எ	എ

Vatteluttu	ISO	Equivalent letter in	
Vatteluttu	ISO	Tamil	Malayalam
	k	க	ക
	ṅ	ங	ങ
	c	ச	ച
	ñ	ஞ	ഞ
	ṭ	ட	ട
	ṇ	ண	ണ
	t	த	ത
	n	ந	ന
	p	ப	പ
	m	ம	മ

Vatteluttu	ISO	Equivalent letter in	
Vatteluttu	ISO	Tamil	Malayalam
	ṟ	ற	റ
	y	ய	യ
	r	ர	ര
	l	ல	ല
	ḷ	ள	ള
	v	வ	വ

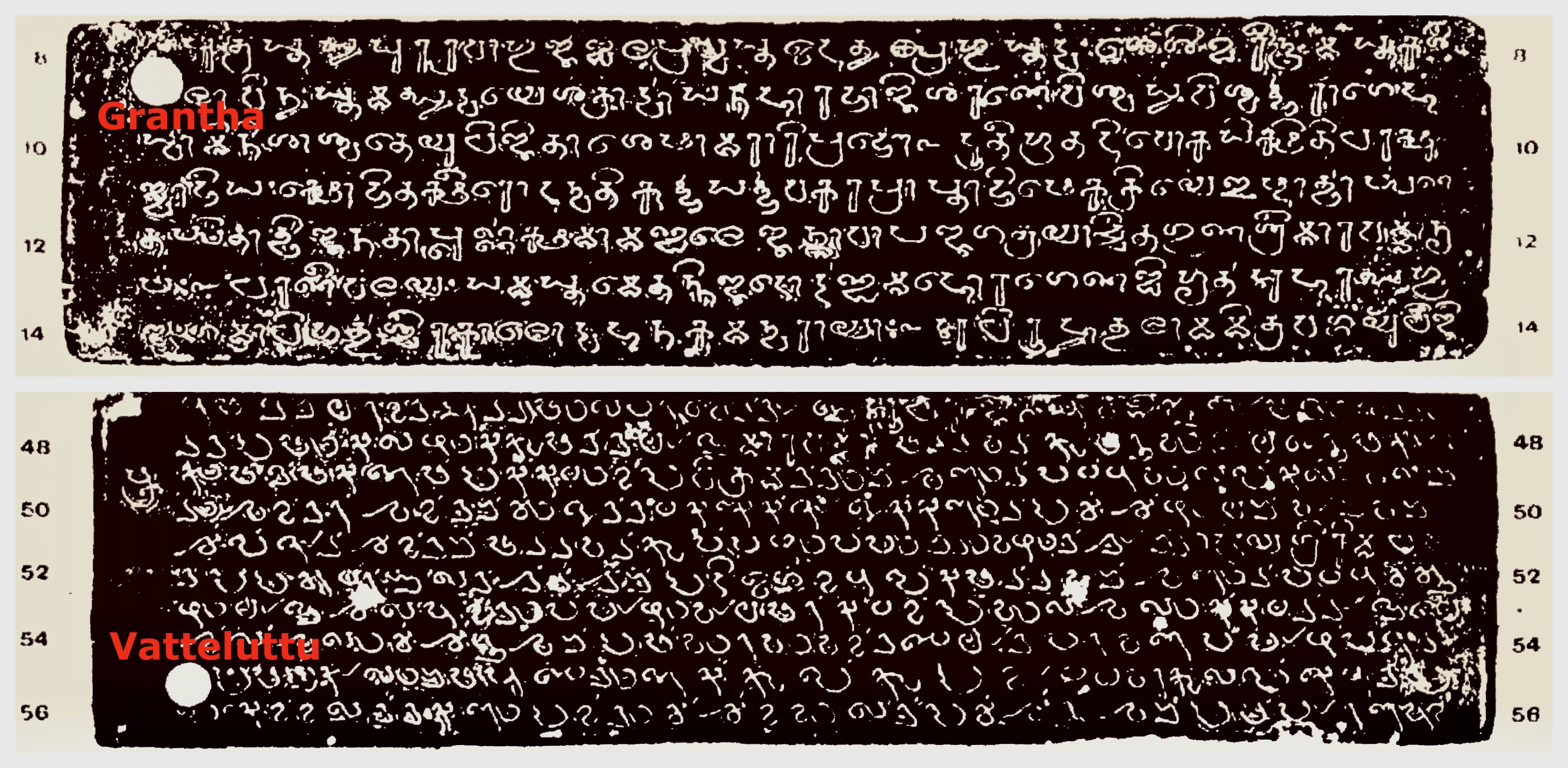
Velvikudi Grant (8th century, Tamil)

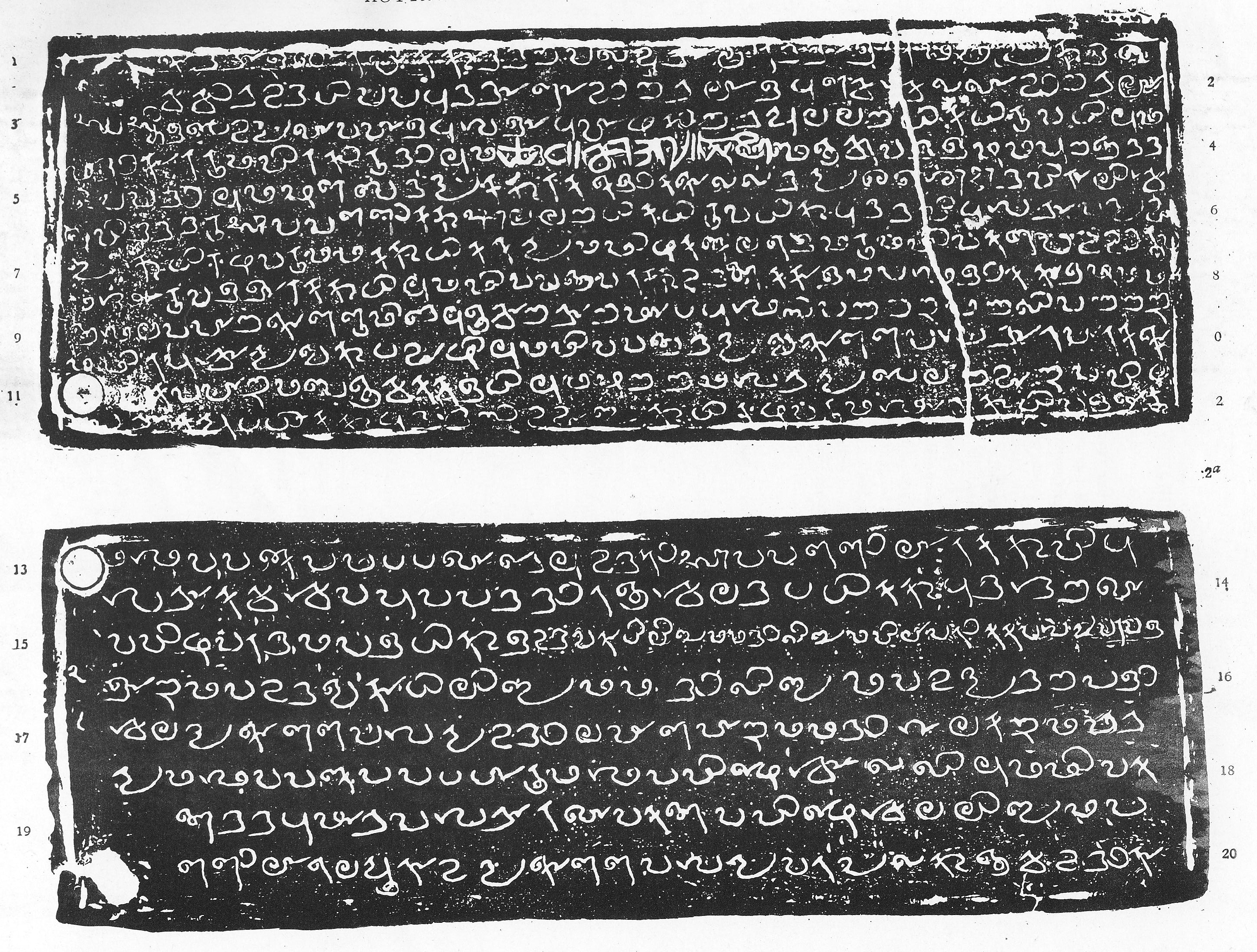
Quilon Plates (9th century, Old Malayalam)

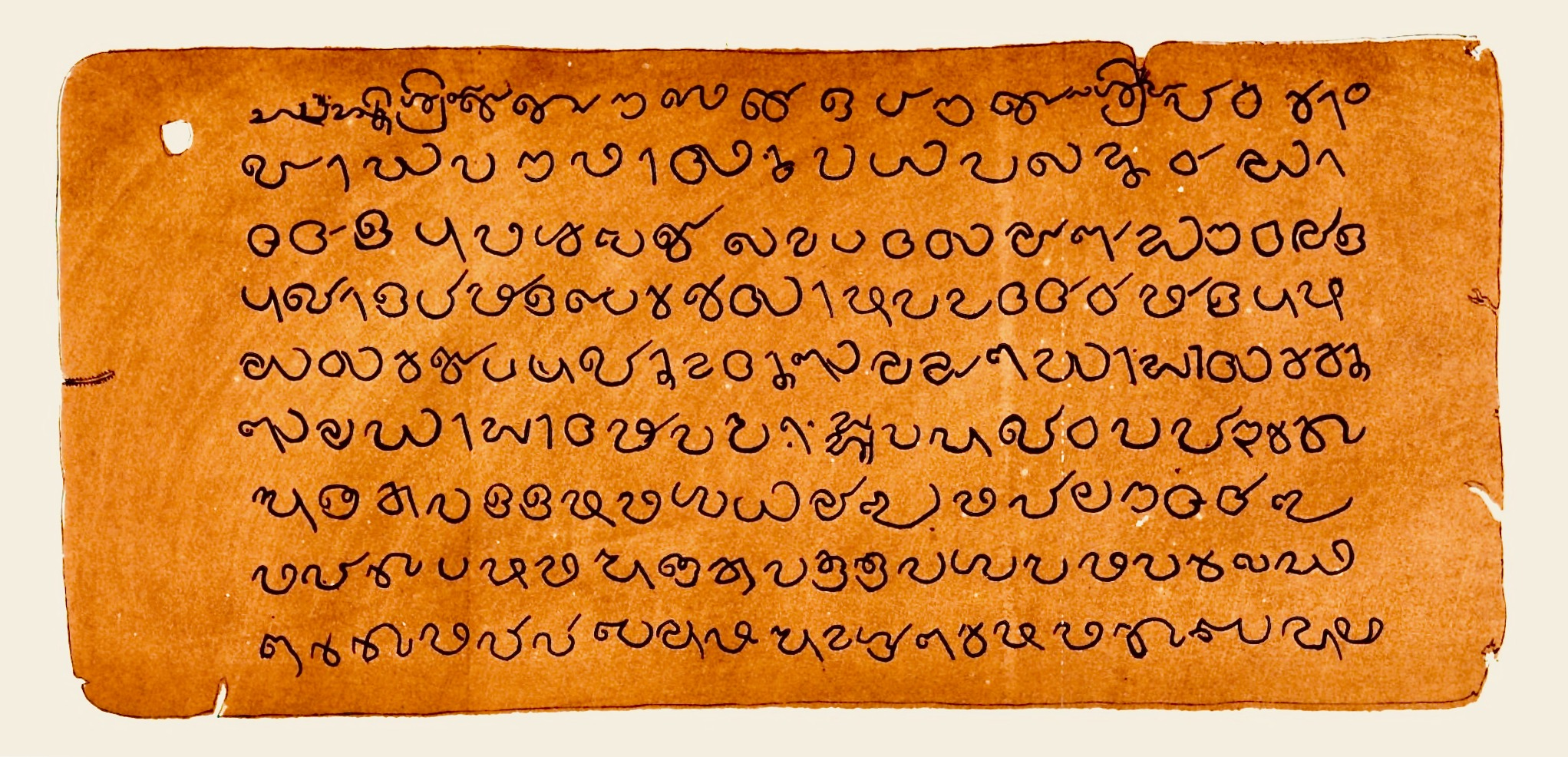
Jewish Plates (11th century, Old Malayalam)

== Unicode ==
Vatteluttu script is not yet added to the unicode standard (but proposals have been made to add it).

== See also ==
- Tamil script
- Pallava script
- Malayalam script
