= Lise Menn =

American linguist (Psycholinguistics)

- Born: Lise J. Waldman; December 28, 1941 (age 84); Philadelphia, Pennsylvania
- Occupation: Linguist
- Spouse: William Bright (m. 1986; died 2006)
- Children: Stephen Menn; Joseph Menn; Susie Bright (stepdaughter)

Academic background
- Education: Swarthmore College - math; Brandeis University - math; UIUC - linguistics

Academic work
- Discipline: Psycholinguistics
- Institutions: University of Colorado at Boulder

Lise Menn (née Lise J. Waldman, born December 28, 1941, in Philadelphia) is an American linguist who specializes in psycholinguistics, including the study of language acquisition and aphasia.

== Professional history ==
Menn earned a bachelor's degree in mathematics in 1962 from Swarthmore College and a master's degree (also in mathematics) from Brandeis University in 1964. After changing fields, she earned a master's, and later a doctorate in linguistics from the University of Illinois at Urbana-Champaign in 1976.

She taught or conducted research at several universities in the Boston area, including a post-doctoral position at MIT under Paula Menyuk and Kenneth N. Stevens, several years as a research associate with Jean Berko Gleason, and six years at the Aphasia Research Center of the Boston University School of Medicine under Harold Goodglass. She also spent a postdoctoral year with Eran Zaidel at UCLA, before being appointed associate professor of linguistics at the University of Colorado in 1986. She is Professor Emerita of linguistics and was a fellow of the Institute for Cognitive Science at the University of Colorado at Boulder in Boulder, Colorado until her retirement in 2007.

Her approaches to linguistics, psycholinguistics, and neurolinguistics are considered to be 'bottom-up' (i.e. data-driven), empiricist, and functionalist. As of 2014, she had written or edited nine books, and more than 50 peer-reviewed articles. Her most recent work as of 2025 was The Menn Phonetic Mini-Corpus: Articulatory Gestures as Precursors to the Emergence of Segments published in April 2021. It was co-written by Ann M. Peters and Yvan Rose. Her many doctoral advisees and co-advisees include Patrick Juola.

== Honors ==
Menn has been a member of the governing committees of the Academy of Aphasia, the Linguistic Society of America, and the Linguistics and Language Sciences section of the American Association for the Advancement of Science.

In 2006, she was inducted as a Fellow of the Linguistic Society of America. In 2014 she was elected as a Fellow of the American Association for the Advancement of Science.

== Personal life ==
Menn was married to fellow linguist William Bright from 1986 until his death in 2006. Her first husband was Michael D. Menn; they were divorced in 1972. She is the mother of Stephen Menn and Joseph Menn, and stepmother of Susie Bright.

== Selected publications ==
- On the acquisition of phonology, by Paul Kiparsky & Lise Menn. In John Macnamara (ed.), Language Learning and Thought. New York: Academic Press (1977), pp. 47–78. Reprinted in G. Ioup & S. H. Weinberger (eds.), Interlanguage Phonology: The Acquisition of a Second Language Sound System. Cambridge, MA: Newbury House (1987), pp. 23–52.
- Elvish loanwords in Indo-European: Cultural implications. [Parody]. In J. Allan (ed.), An Introduction to Elvish. Somerset: Bran's Head Books Ltd. (1978), pp. 143–151. Book reprinted 1995.
- Fundamental frequency and discourse structure, by Lise Menn & Suzanne Boyce. Language and Speech 25, 341–383 (1982).
- Development of articulatory, phonetic, and phonological capabilities. In Brian Butterworth (ed.), Language Production, vol. 2. London: Academic Press (1983), pp. 3–50.
- Contrasting cases of Italian agrammatic aphasia without comprehension disorder, by Gabriele Miceli, Anna Mazzucchi, Lise Menn, & Harold Goodglass. Brain and Language 19, 65–97 (1983).
- False starts and filler syllables: Ways to learn grammatical morphemes, by Ann M. Peters & Lise Menn). Language 69, 4 (1993). pp. 742–777.
- Non-Fluent Aphasia in a Multilingual World. (Studies in Speech Pathology and Clinical Linguistics, Vol 5), by Lise Menn, M. O'Connor, Loraine K. Obler, and Audrey Holland. (1996). John Benjamins. ISBN 978-1-55619-391-0
- Phonological Development: Models, Research, Implications (Communicating By Language), by Charles A. Ferguson, Lise Menn, and Carol Stoel-Gammon. (1992). York Press. ISBN 978-0-912752-24-2
- A linguistic communication measure for aphasic narratives, by Lise Menn, Gail Ramsberger, & Nancy Helm-Estabrooks. Aphasiology 8, 343–359. (1994).
- Methods for Studying Language Production, by Lise Menn and Nan Bernstein Ratner. (2000). Lawrence Erlbaum. ISBN 978-0-8058-3034-7
- Agrammatic Aphasia: A Cross-Language Narrative Sourcebook, edited by Lise Menn and Loraine K. Obler. (1990). John Benjamins. ISBN 978-1-55619-024-7
