= Written Language and Literacy =

- Discipline: Linguistics
- Language: English
- Edited by: Dorit Ravid

Publication details
- History: 1998–present
- Publisher: John Benjamins
- Frequency: Biannual

Standard abbreviations
- ISO 4: Writ. Lang. Lit.

Indexing
- ISSN: 1387-6732 (print); 1570-6001 (web)

Links
- Journal homepage

Written Language and Literacy is a peer-reviewed biannual academic journal of linguistics published by John Benjamins Publishing Company. The editor-in-chief is Dorit Ravid (Tel Aviv University). It is abstracted and indexed by European Reference Index for the Humanities, Linguistic Bibliography/Bibliographie Linguistique, MLA Bibliography, and Scopus. The journal was established in 1998.
