= Western Pwo alphabet =

Abugida used for writing Western Pwo language

Western Pwo alphabet ၦဖျိၩ့ၡိအလံၬခၪ့ထံၭ
- Script type: Abugida
- Period: 1850–present
- Languages: Western Pwo language

Related scripts
- Parent systems: Proto-Sinaitic alphabet: Phoenician alphabet; Aramaic alphabet; Brahmi script; Pallava script; Mon-Burmese; Western Pwo alphabet

ISO 15924
- ISO 15924: Mymr (350), Myanmar (Burmese)

Unicode
- Unicode alias: Myanmar
- Unicode range: U+1000–U+104F

The Western Pwo alphabet (Pwo Western Karen: ၦဖျိၩ့ၡိအလံၬခၪ့ထံၭ /pə pʰloúɴ ɕô ʔə leiʔ kʰàɴ tʰeiʔ/) is an abugida used for writing Western Pwo language. It was derived from the Burmese script in the early 19th century, and ultimately from either the Kadamba or Pallava alphabet of South India. The Western Pwo alphabet is also used for the liturgical languages of Pali and Sanskrit.

== History ==
The Christian Pwo Karen Script is used as the writing system for Western Pwo. This script was originally created by Baptist missionaries for Eastern Pwo language. Western Pwo and Eastern Pwo differ considerably in terms of phonology. However, when the missionaries started using this script for Western Pwo language, they did not make any changes to the script. They only changed the readings according to the regular phonological correspondences. In addition to showing the correspondence between orthography and phonology.

The most widely used writing systems for Pwo Karen dialects are the Buddhist Pwo Karen Script and the Christian Pwo Karen Script, both of which have an abugida system. The Christian Pwo Karen Script was created in the 1840s by American Baptist missionaries, including Wade, Mason, and Brayton. This script is called the Christian Pwo Karen Script or the Mission script. The Christian Pwo Karen Script was created based on the Christian S'gaw Karen Script, which was created by Wade in the 1830s using symbols in the Burmese script. In the early stage of the Christian Pwo Karen Script, there were some novel innovations not seen in the Christian Sgaw Karen Script, such as the use of Roman letters and the juxtaposition of basic letters and vowel signs. However, these innovations seem to have caused problems in reading and writing.

Therefore, it was modified by the early 1850s to be closer to the method of Christian Sgaw Karen Script. the Christian Pwo Karen Script system fits very well with the phonological system of the Hpa-an dialect, an Eastern Pwo Karen dialect and even better with the presumed phonological system of the Hpa-an dialect of the 19th century. Therefore, it is reasonable to assume that the Christian Pwo Karen Script was created based on the phonological system of the 19th-century Hpa-an dialect. Although the Christian Pwo Karen Script was created for Eastern Pwo language, it later came to be used as the script for Western Pwo Karen spoken in the Ayeyarwady Delta. It is not known precisely when Western Pwo language was first written in the Christian Pwo Karen Script. But, it is certain that an attempt to write Western Pwo language in the Christian Pwo Karen Script had already been made at a very early stage in the Christian Pwo Karen Script history, that is, at the beginning of the 1850s.

Today, the Christian Pwo Karen Script is mostly regarded as a Western Pwo language writing system by the Karens, because Eastern Pwo language speakers mainly use the Buddhist Pwo Karen Script and the Christian Pwo Karen is mainly used by Western Pwo language speakers. Moreover, in Western Pwo language speaking areas, the Christian Pwo Karen has also become increasingly popular among Buddhists over the last 20 to 30 years. Books written by Buddhist monks, such as ၥမံၫ့မုပျၩ့ /θəmèiɴ mɯ̂ pláɴ/ (2005)—a collection of commentaries on the Dharma of Buddhism—have also been published in this script. Therefore, we can safely say that this script is now establishing itself as an orthography of Western Pwo language.

== Alphabet ==
The current version of Western Pwo alphabet is modified by Rev Durlin Lee Brayton (1808–1900).

=== Vowels ===
Like S'gaw Karen alphabet, Western Pwo alphabet doesn't have independent vowels. The ten vowel signs (Pwo Western Karen: လံၬလူၥီၫ) are as follows:

ါ a IPA: /a/	ံ i IPA: /i/	့ e IPA: /e/	ဲ ae ~ ai IPA: /ɛ/ or /ai/	ၧ oe IPA: /ə/	ၨ uh IPA: /ɨ/	ု eu IPA: /ɯ/	ူ u IPA: /u/	ိ o IPA: /o/	ီ aw ~ au IPA: /ɔ/ or /au/

- The symbol for the vowel /-a/ is ါ. This symbol is written only when the tones are unmarked.
- ဲ represents both /-ɛ/ and /-ai/. The script does not distinguish between the two vowels.
- ီ represents both /-ɔ/ and /-au/. The script does not distinguish between the two vowels.

=== Consonants ===
The Western Pwo alphabet is characterised by the circular letter forms of the Mon-Burmese script. It is an abugida, all letters having an inherent vowel /ə/. Vowels are represented in the form of diacritics placed next to the consonants. It is written left to right. There are 26 consonants (Pwo Western Karen: လံၬမ့ၬဖျိၪ့). The following table provides the letter, the syllable onset in IPA and the way the letter is referred to in Western Pwo language:

က k IPA: k ကၭ kaʔ	ခ kh IPA: kh ခၭ kʰaʔ	ဂ gh IPA: gh ဂၭ ɣaʔ	ဎ ch IPA: ch ဎၭ xaʔ	င ng IPA: ng ငၭ ŋaʔ
စ s IPA: s စၭ saʔ	ဆ hs IPA: hs ဆၭ sʰaʔ	ဇ z IPA: z ဇၭ zaʔ	ည ny IPA: ny ညၭ ɲaʔ	ၡ sh IPA: sh ၡၭ ɕaʔ
တ t IPA: t တၭ taʔ	ထ ht IPA: ht ထၭ tʰaʔ	ဒ d IPA: d ဒၭ ɗaʔ	န n IPA: n နၭ naʔ	ပ p IPA: p ပၭ paʔ
ဖ hp IPA: hp ဖၭ pʰaʔ	ဘ b IPA: b ဘၭ ɓaʔ	မ m IPA: m မၭ maʔ	ယ y IPA: y ယၭ jaʔ	ရ r IPA: r ရၭ raʔ
လ l IPA: l လၭ laʔ	ဝ w IPA: w ဝၭ waʔ	ၥ th IPA: th ၥၭ θaʔ	ဟ h IPA: h ဟၭ haʔ	အ a IPA: a အၭ ʔaʔ
ဧ hh IPA: hh ဧၭ ɣaʔ

- ည didn't include at the original Western Pwo Alphabet. At that time, /ɲ/ was written as နၠ. Today, this is found in အနၠါမုနံၩ /ʔə ɲâ mɯ̂ ní/ 'Tuesday'.
- ၦ was included in the original Western Pwo alphabet. ၦ is a special character that is used to write the prefix ၦ /pə-/ denoting a human being.

Consonant letters may be modified by one medial diacritic (Pwo Western Karen: လံၬအီၪဒံၩ့), indicating an additional consonant before the vowel. These diacritics are:

ၠ j IPA: /-j-/	ျ l IPA: /-l-/	ြ r IPA: /-r-/	ွ w IPA: /-w-/

- Christian Pwo Karen script ျ /-l-/ and ၠ /-j-/ are identical in shape to ျ /-j-/ and ၠ /-l-/ in the Buddhist Pwo Karen Script, but the relationship between the letters and sounds is inverse. The usage of the Christian Pwo Karen Script is based on that of the Christian S'gaw Karen Script, whereas the usage of the Buddhist Pwo Karen Script is based on that of the Mon Script.
- When ၠ is combined with က as in ကၠ, it is pronounced as /tɕ-/, not /kj-/. And ခၠ, နၠ are pronounced as /tɕʰ-/ and /ɲ-/ respectively.

=== Tone ===
The tones are indicated by tone markers (Pwo Western Karen: လံၬထီးနဲၪ့) at the end of the syllable. In the absence of any marker, the default is the falling tone.

Tone	Tone marker	Name
High-level	ၩ IPA: /á/ [a55]	ကဲၪ့ကီၪ့ /kàiɴ kàuɴ/
High-level	ၩ့ IPA: /áɴ/ [ã55]	ကဲၪ့ကီၪ့ငၭၥံၫ /kàiɴ kàuɴ ŋaʔ θì/
Low-level	ၪ IPA: /à/ [a11]	ကဲၪ့ပ့ၪ /kàiɴ pè/
Low-level	ၫ IPA: /à/ [a11]	ကဲၪ့လၩ့ /kàiɴ láɴ/
Low-level	ၫ့ IPA: /àɴ/ [ã11]	ကဲၪ့လၩ့ငၭၥံၫ /kàiɴ láɴ ŋaʔ θì/
Low-level	ၪ့ IPA: /àɴ/ [ã11]	ကဲၪ့ပ့ၪငၭၥံၫ /kàiɴ pè ŋaʔ θì/
Checked	ၬ IPA: /aʔ/ [aʔ51]	ကဲၪ့ထၪ့ /kàiɴ tʰàɴ/
Checked	ၭ IPA: /aʔ/ [aʔ51]	ကဲၪ့ကူၭ /kàiɴ kouʔ/
Falling	◌ IPA: /â/ [a51]	Consonant with vowel only
Falling	း IPA: /âɴ/ [ã51]	ငၭၥံၫ /ŋaʔ θì/

=== Syllable rhymes ===
The horizontal columns are arranged according to the tone symbols, and the vertical columns are arranged according to the vowel symbols (plus the nasalization symbol). No instances have been found for some combinations of rhyme and tone. Syllable rhymes of Western Pwo alphabet, used with the letter က [k] as a sample.

No mark	ၩ	ၪ	ၫ	ၬ	ၭ	ၩ့	ၫ့	ၪ့	း
ကါ IPA: kâ	ကၩ IPA: ká	ကၪ IPA: kà	ကၫ IPA: kà	ကၬ IPA: kaʔ	ကၭ IPA: kaʔ	ကၩ့ IPA: káɴ	ကၫ့ IPA: kàɴ	ကၪ့ IPA: kàɴ	ကး IPA: kâɴ
ကံ IPA: kî	ကံၩ IPA: kí	ကံၪ IPA: kì	ကံၫ IPA: kì	ကံၬ IPA: keiʔ	ကံၭ IPA: keiʔ	ကံၩ့ IPA: kéiɴ	ကံၫ့ IPA: kèiɴ	ကံၪ့ IPA: kèiɴ	ကံး IPA: kêiɴ
က့ IPA: kê	က့ၩ IPA: ké	က့ၪ IPA: kè	က့ၫ IPA: kè	က့ၬ IPA: keʔ	က့ၭ IPA: keʔ	က့ၩ့^{1} IPA: kɪ́ɴ	က့ၫ့^{1} IPA: kɪ̀ɴ	က့ၪ့^{1} IPA: kɪ̀ɴ	က့း^{1} IPA: kɪ̂ɴ
ကဲ IPA: kɛ̂ / kâi	ကဲၩ IPA: kɛ́ / kái	ကဲၪ IPA: kɛ̀ / kài	ကဲၫ IPA: kɛ̀ / kài	ကဲၬ IPA: kɛʔ / kaiʔ	ကဲၭ IPA: kɛʔ / kaiʔ	ကဲၩ့ IPA: káiɴ	ကဲၫ့ IPA: kàiɴ	ကဲၪ့ IPA: kàiɴ	ကဲး IPA: kâiɴ
ကၧ IPA: kə̂	ကၧၩ IPA: kə́	ကၧၪ IPA: kə̀	ကၧၫ IPA: kə̀	ကၧၬ IPA: kəʔ	ကၧၭ IPA: kəʔ	ကၪၩ့ IPA: kə́ɴ^{2}	ကၧၫ့ IPA: kə̀ɴ^{2}	ကၧၪ့ IPA: kə̀ɴ^{2}	ကၧး IPA: kə̂ɴ^{2}
ကၨ IPA: kɨ̂	ကၨၩ IPA: kɨ́	ကၨၪ IPA: kɨ̀	ကၨၫ IPA: kɨ̀	ကၨၬ IPA: kɨʔ	ကၨၭ IPA: kɨʔ	ကၨၩ့ IPA: kɨ́ɴ	ကၨၫ့ IPA: kɨ̀ɴ	ကၨၪ့ IPA: kɨ̀ɴ	ကၨး IPA: kɨ̂ɴ
ကု IPA: kɯ̂	ကုၩ IPA: kɯ́	ကုၪ IPA: kɯ̀	ကုၫ IPA: kɯ̀	ကုၬ IPA: kəɯʔ	ကုၭ IPA: kəɯʔ	ကုၩ့ IPA: kə́ɴ^{2}	ကုၫ့ IPA: kə̀ɴ^{2}	ကုၪ့ IPA: kə̀ɴ^{2}	ကုး IPA: kə̂ɴ^{2}
ကူ IPA: kû	ကူၩ IPA: kú	ကူၪ IPA: kù	ကူၫ IPA: kù	ကူၬ IPA: kouʔ	ကူၭ IPA: kouʔ				
ကိ IPA: kô	ကိၩ IPA: kó	ကိၪ IPA: kò	ကိၫ IPA: kò	ကိၬ IPA: koʔ	ကိၭ IPA: koʔ	ကိၩ့ IPA: kóuɴ	ကိၫ့ IPA: kòuɴ	ကိၪ့ IPA: kòuɴ	ကိး IPA: kôuɴ
ကီ IPA: kɔ̂ / kâu	ကီၩ IPA: kɔ́ / káu	ကီၪ IPA: kɔ̀ / kàu	ကီၫ IPA: kɔ̀ / kàu	ကီၬ IPA: kɔʔ / kauʔ	ကီၭ IPA: kɔʔ / kauʔ	ကီၩ့ IPA: káuɴ	ကီၫ့ IPA: kàuɴ	ကီၪ့ IPA: kàuɴ	ကီး IPA: kâuɴ

^{1} These are only used to represent Burmese loanwords or those from other languages that have entered via Burmese.

^{2} The nasalization of /-əɴ/ is very weak and may be eliminated. In that case, /-əɴ/ loses its phonetic distinction from /-ə/.

== Numerals ==
A decimal numbering system is used, and numbers are written in the same order as Hindu–Arabic numerals. The number 1945 would be written as ၁၉၄၅. Separators, such as commas, are not used to group numbers.

=== Zero to nine ===
The numerals are listed below:

0 ၀	1 ၁ IPA: /lə̀ɴ/¹ လၧၫ့^{1}	2 ၂ IPA: /nì/² နံၫ^{2}	3 ၃ IPA: /θə̀ɴ/² ၥၧၫ့^{2}	4 ၄ IPA: /lî/ လံ	5 ၅ IPA: /jâi/ ယဲ	6 ၆ IPA: /xù/² ဎူၫ^{2}	7 ၇ IPA: /nwè/³ နွ့ၫ^{3}	8 ၈ IPA: /xoʔ/ ဎိၭ	9 ၉ IPA: /kʰwì/² ခွံၫ^{2}

^{1} Spoken Western Pwo language for one may be က /kə/.
^{2} In some dialect, when quantifiers or other numbers are preceded, နံၫ is pronounced as /ní/, ၥၧၫ့ as /θə́ɴ/, ဎူၫ as /xú/ and ခွံၫ as /kʰwí/.
^{3} In some dialect, နွ့ၫ is pronounced as /nwì/. When quantifiers or other numbers are preceded, နွ့ၫ is pronounced as /nwé/ or /nwí/.

=== Ten to a million ===
The digits from ten to a million are provided below:

10 ၁၀ IPA: /kə sʰì/ ကဆံၫ	11 ၁၁ IPA: /kə sʰì lə̀ɴ/ ကဆံၫလၧၫ့	12 ၁၂ IPA: /kə sʰì nì/ ကဆံၫနံၫ	20 ၂၀ IPA: /ní sʰì/ နံၫဆံၫ	21 ၂၁ IPA: /ní sʰì lə̀ɴ/ နံၫဆံၫလၧၫ့	22 ၂၂ IPA: /ní sʰì nì/ နံၫဆံၫနံၫ	100 ၁၀၀ IPA: /kə já/^{1} ကယၩ	1 000 ၁ ၀၀၀ IPA: /kə tʰàuɴ/^{2} ကထီၫ့	10 000 ၁၀ ၀၀၀ IPA: /kə laʔ/^{3} ကလၬ	100 000 ၁၀၀ ၀၀၀ IPA: /kə kəɯʔ/^{4} ကကုၭ	1 000 000 ၁ ၀၀၀ ၀၀၀ IPA: /kə kʰwâɴ/ or /kə kʰwàɴ/ ကခွး or ကခွၪ့	10 000 000 ၁၀ ၀၀၀ ၀၀၀ IPA: /kə ɓáɴ/ or /kə tɨʔ/ ကဘၩ့ or ကတၨၭ

^{1} Borrowed from Burmese (Burmese: ရာ (IPA: [jà]).
^{2} Borrowed from Burmese (Burmese: ထောင် IPA: [tʰàʊɰ̃]).
^{3} Borrowed from Mon language (Mon: လက် /lɔk/).
^{4} Borrowed from Mon language (Mon: ကိုတ် /kɒt/).

== Punctuation ==
There are two primary break characters in Western Pwo: comma and full stop.

== Unicode ==
Myanmar script was added to the Unicode Standard in September 1999 with the release of version 3.0.

The Unicode block for Myanmar is U+1000–U+109F:

Myanmar^{[1]} Official Unicode Consortium code chart (PDF)
	0	1	2	3	4	5	6	7	8	9	A	B	C	D	E	F
U+100x	က	ခ	ဂ	ဃ	င	စ	ဆ	ဇ	ဈ	ဉ	ည	ဋ	ဌ	ဍ	ဎ	ဏ
U+101x	တ	ထ	ဒ	ဓ	န	ပ	ဖ	ဗ	ဘ	မ	ယ	ရ	လ	ဝ	သ	ဟ
U+102x	ဠ	အ	ဢ	ဣ	ဤ	ဥ	ဦ	ဧ	ဨ	ဩ	ဪ	ါ	ာ	ိ	ီ	ု
U+103x	ူ	ေ	ဲ	ဳ	ဴ	ဵ	ံ	့	း	္	်	ျ	ြ	ွ	ှ	ဿ
U+104x	၀	၁	၂	၃	၄	၅	၆	၇	၈	၉	၊	။	၌	၍	၎	၏
U+105x	ၐ	ၑ	ၒ	ၓ	ၔ	ၕ	ၖ	ၗ	ၘ	ၙ	ၚ	ၛ	ၜ	ၝ	ၞ	ၟ
U+106x	ၠ	ၡ	ၢ	ၣ	ၤ	ၥ	ၦ	ၧ	ၨ	ၩ	ၪ	ၫ	ၬ	ၭ	ၮ	ၯ
U+107x	ၰ	ၱ	ၲ	ၳ	ၴ	ၵ	ၶ	ၷ	ၸ	ၹ	ၺ	ၻ	ၼ	ၽ	ၾ	ၿ
U+108x	ႀ	ႁ	ႂ	ႃ	ႄ	ႅ	ႆ	ႇ	ႈ	ႉ	ႊ	ႋ	ႌ	ႍ	ႎ	ႏ
U+109x	႐	႑	႒	႓	႔	႕	႖	႗	႘	႙	ႚ	ႛ	ႜ	ႝ	႞	႟
Notes 1.As of Unicode version 18.0
