= Myanmar (Unicode block) =

- Range: U+1000..U+109F (160 code points)
- Plane: BMP
- Scripts: Myanmar
- Major alphabets: Burmese; Mon; Karen; Kayah; Shan; Palaung
- Assigned: 160 code points
- Unused: 0 reserved code points

Unicode version history
- 3.0 (1999): 78 (+78)
- 5.1 (2008): 156 (+78)
- 5.2 (2009): 160 (+4)

Unicode documentation
- Code chart ∣ Web page
- Note: Range used for Tibetan script prior to Unicode 1.0.1 (see Tibetan (obsolete Unicode block)).

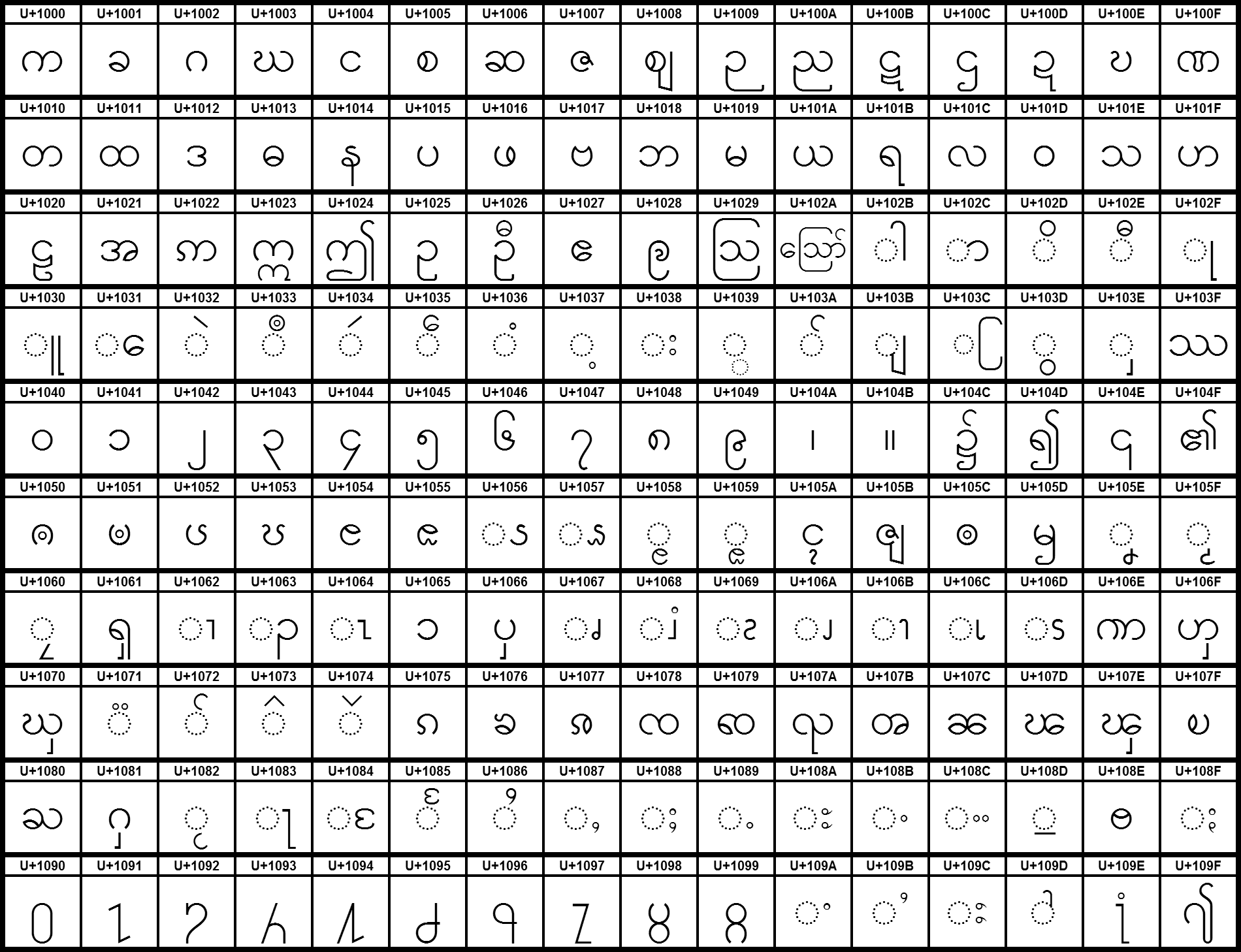
Graphical representation of the Myanmar Unicode block

Myanmar is a Unicode block containing characters for the Burmese, Mon, Shan, Palaung, and the Karen languages of Myanmar, as well as the Aiton and Phake languages of Northeast India. It is also used to write Pali and Sanskrit in Myanmar.

== Block ==
Myanmar^{[1]} Official Unicode Consortium code chart (PDF)
	0	1	2	3	4	5	6	7	8	9	A	B	C	D	E	F
U+100x	က	ခ	ဂ	ဃ	င	စ	ဆ	ဇ	ဈ	ဉ	ည	ဋ	ဌ	ဍ	ဎ	ဏ
U+101x	တ	ထ	ဒ	ဓ	န	ပ	ဖ	ဗ	ဘ	မ	ယ	ရ	လ	ဝ	သ	ဟ
U+102x	ဠ	အ	ဢ	ဣ	ဤ	ဥ	ဦ	ဧ	ဨ	ဩ	ဪ	ါ	ာ	ိ	ီ	ု
U+103x	ူ	ေ	ဲ	ဳ	ဴ	ဵ	ံ	့	း	္	်	ျ	ြ	ွ	ှ	ဿ
U+104x	၀	၁	၂	၃	၄	၅	၆	၇	၈	၉	၊	။	၌	၍	၎	၏
U+105x	ၐ	ၑ	ၒ	ၓ	ၔ	ၕ	ၖ	ၗ	ၘ	ၙ	ၚ	ၛ	ၜ	ၝ	ၞ	ၟ
U+106x	ၠ	ၡ	ၢ	ၣ	ၤ	ၥ	ၦ	ၧ	ၨ	ၩ	ၪ	ၫ	ၬ	ၭ	ၮ	ၯ
U+107x	ၰ	ၱ	ၲ	ၳ	ၴ	ၵ	ၶ	ၷ	ၸ	ၹ	ၺ	ၻ	ၼ	ၽ	ၾ	ၿ
U+108x	ႀ	ႁ	ႂ	ႃ	ႄ	ႅ	ႆ	ႇ	ႈ	ႉ	ႊ	ႋ	ႌ	ႍ	ႎ	ႏ
U+109x	႐	႑	႒	႓	႔	႕	႖	႗	႘	႙	ႚ	ႛ	ႜ	ႝ	႞	႟
Notes 1.As of Unicode version 17.0

The block has sixteen variation sequences defined for standardized variants. They use U+FE00 VARIATION SELECTOR-1 (VS01) to denote the dotted letters used for the Khamti, Aiton, and Phake languages. (Note that this is font dependent. For example, the Padauk font supports some of the dotted forms.)

Variation sequences for dotted forms
U+	1000	1002	1004	1010	1011	1015	1019	101A	101C	101D	1022	1031	1075	1078	107A	1080
base code point	က	ဂ	င	တ	ထ	ပ	မ	ယ	လ	ဝ	ဢ	ေ	ၵ	ၸ	ၺ	ႀ
base + VS01	က︀	ဂ︀	င︀	တ︀	ထ︀	ပ︀	မ︀	ယ︀	လ︀	ဝ︀	ဢ︀	ေ︀	ၵ︀	ၸ︀	ၺ︀	ႀ︀

== History ==
The following Unicode-related documents record the purpose and process of defining specific characters in the Myanmar block:

Version	Final code points (Note: Proposed code points and characters names may differ from final code points and names)	Count	UTC ID	L2 ID	WG2 ID	Document
3.0	U+1000..1021, 1023..1027, 1029..102A, 102C..1032, 1036..1039, 1040..1059	78			N881	Ross, Hugh McGregor (1993-04-02), Comment on Burmese Script
3.0	U+1000..1021, 1023..1027, 1029..102A, 102C..1032, 1036..1039, 1040..1059	78			N1167	Everson, Michael (1995-03-12), Names of Burmese characters: comment on Unicode Technical Report #1
3.0	U+1000..1021, 1023..1027, 1029..102A, 102C..1032, 1036..1039, 1040..1059	78		X3L2/96-061		Everson, Michael (1996-05-28), Proposal for encoding the Burmese script in ISO 10646
3.0	U+1000..1021, 1023..1027, 1029..102A, 102C..1032, 1036..1039, 1040..1059	78	UTC/1996-027.2			Greenfield, Steve (1996-07-01), "F. Burmese", UTC #69 Minutes (PART 2)
3.0	U+1000..1021, 1023..1027, 1029..102A, 102C..1032, 1036..1039, 1040..1059	78		L2/97-039	N1523	Ross, Hugh McGregor; Everson, Michael (1997-01-22), Proposal for encoding the Burmese script in ISO 10646
3.0	U+1000..1021, 1023..1027, 1029..102A, 102C..1032, 1036..1039, 1040..1059	78		L2/97-288	N1603	Umamaheswaran, V. S. (1997-10-24), "8.13", Unconfirmed Meeting Minutes, WG 2 Meeting # 33, Heraklion, Crete, Greece, 20 June – 4 July 1997
3.0	U+1000..1021, 1023..1027, 1029..102A, 102C..1032, 1036..1039, 1040..1059	78		L2/98-044		Collins, Lee (1998-02-23), Revised Proposal for Encoding Burmese in Unicode
3.0	U+1000..1021, 1023..1027, 1029..102A, 102C..1032, 1036..1039, 1040..1059	78		L2/98-101	N1729	Ad-hoc report on Burmese and Khmer, 1998-03-18
3.0	U+1000..1021, 1023..1027, 1029..102A, 102C..1032, 1036..1039, 1040..1059	78		L2/98-177		Text for PDAM registration and consideration ballot for ISO 10646-1 Amendment 26 - Burmese, 1998-05-11
3.0	U+1000..1021, 1023..1027, 1029..102A, 102C..1032, 1036..1039, 1040..1059	78			N1780	PDAM 26 - Burmese, 1998-05-11
3.0	U+1000..1021, 1023..1027, 1029..102A, 102C..1032, 1036..1039, 1040..1059	78			N1826	Paterson, Bruce (1998-05-11), PDAM26 - Burmese cover sheet
3.0	U+1000..1021, 1023..1027, 1029..102A, 102C..1032, 1036..1039, 1040..1059	78			N1826.1	Paterson, Bruce (1998-05-11), PDAM26 - Burmese full text
3.0	U+1000..1021, 1023..1027, 1029..102A, 102C..1032, 1036..1039, 1040..1059	78		L2/98-158		Aliprand, Joan; Winkler, Arnold (1998-05-26), "Burmese", Draft Minutes – UTC #76 & NCITS Subgroup L2 #173 joint meeting, Tredyffrin, Pennsylvania, April 20-22, 1998
3.0	U+1000..1021, 1023..1027, 1029..102A, 102C..1032, 1036..1039, 1040..1059	78		L2/98-286	N1703	Umamaheswaran, V. S.; Ksar, Mike (1998-07-02), "8.18", Unconfirmed Meeting Minutes, WG 2 Meeting #34, Redmond, WA, USA; 1998-03-16--20
3.0	U+1000..1021, 1023..1027, 1029..102A, 102C..1032, 1036..1039, 1040..1059	78		L2/98-265		Htut, Zaw (1998-07-24), Response to Burmese Proposal N1729 (Expert Contribution)
3.0	U+1000..1021, 1023..1027, 1029..102A, 102C..1032, 1036..1039, 1040..1059	78		L2/98-281R (pdf, html)		Aliprand, Joan (1998-07-31), "Burmese (IV.E.1)", Unconfirmed Minutes – UTC #77 & NCITS Subgroup L2 # 174 JOINT MEETING, Redmond, WA -- July 29-31, 1998
3.0	U+1000..1021, 1023..1027, 1029..102A, 102C..1032, 1036..1039, 1040..1059	78			N1836 (html, doc, Ireland, Japan)	Summary of Voting/Table of Replies - Amendment 26 - Burmese, 1998-08-27
3.0	U+1000..1021, 1023..1027, 1029..102A, 102C..1032, 1036..1039, 1040..1059	78		L2/98-371	N1883R2	Whistler, Ken (1998-09-24), Myanmar (Burmese) Ad-Hoc Meeting Report
3.0	U+1000..1021, 1023..1027, 1029..102A, 102C..1032, 1036..1039, 1040..1059	78		L2/98-325		ISO/IEC 10646-1/FPDAM 26, AMENDMENT 26: Myanmar, 1998-10-23
3.0	U+1000..1021, 1023..1027, 1029..102A, 102C..1032, 1036..1039, 1040..1059	78		L2/98-342		Disposition of comments report on SC2 N3106, ISO 10646 Amd. 26: Burmese, 1998-10-23
3.0	U+1000..1021, 1023..1027, 1029..102A, 102C..1032, 1036..1039, 1040..1059	78			N1912	Paterson, Bruce; Everson, Michael (1998-10-23), Disposition of Comments - FPDAM26 - Burmese
3.0	U+1000..1021, 1023..1027, 1029..102A, 102C..1032, 1036..1039, 1040..1059	78			N1913	Paterson, Bruce; Everson, Michael (1998-10-23), Text of FPDAM 26 - Myanmar/Burmese
3.0	U+1000..1021, 1023..1027, 1029..102A, 102C..1032, 1036..1039, 1040..1059	78		L2/99-010	N1903 (pdf, html, doc)	Umamaheswaran, V. S. (1998-12-30), "8.1.7", Minutes of WG 2 meeting 35, London, U.K.; 1998-09-21--25
3.0	U+1000..1021, 1023..1027, 1029..102A, 102C..1032, 1036..1039, 1040..1059	78		L2/99-036		Becker, Joe (1999-02-02), Proposal that Myanmar VOWEL SIGN E be Stored in Phonetic Order (i.e. After its Consonant)
3.0	U+1000..1021, 1023..1027, 1029..102A, 102C..1032, 1036..1039, 1040..1059	78		L2/99-129		Paterson, Bruce (1999-04-14), Text for FDAM ballot ISO/IEC 10646 FDAM #26 - Myanmar
3.0	U+1000..1021, 1023..1027, 1029..102A, 102C..1032, 1036..1039, 1040..1059	78		L2/99-054R		Aliprand, Joan (1999-06-21), "Myanmar Vowel Sign E", Approved Minutes from the UTC/L2 meeting in Palo Alto, February 3-5, 1999
3.0	U+1000..1021, 1023..1027, 1029..102A, 102C..1032, 1036..1039, 1040..1059	78		L2/99-232	N2003	Umamaheswaran, V. S. (1999-08-03), "6.2.9 FPDAM26 - Myanmar (Burmese) script", Minutes of WG 2 meeting 36, Fukuoka, Japan, 1999-03-09--15
3.0	U+1000..1021, 1023..1027, 1029..102A, 102C..1032, 1036..1039, 1040..1059	78		L2/01-307		Whistler, Ken (2001-08-06), Serious bug in Khmer, Myanmar combining classes
3.0	U+1000..1021, 1023..1027, 1029..102A, 102C..1032, 1036..1039, 1040..1059	78		L2/01-308		Hosken, Martin; Whistler, Ken (2001-08-08), Serious bug in Khmer, Myanmar combining classes
3.0	U+1000..1021, 1023..1027, 1029..102A, 102C..1032, 1036..1039, 1040..1059	78		L2/02-283		Hosken, Martin (2002-07-05), Myanmar Script Canonical Ordering
3.0	U+1000..1021, 1023..1027, 1029..102A, 102C..1032, 1036..1039, 1040..1059	78		L2/06-108		Moore, Lisa (2006-05-25), "Motion 107-M5", UTC #107 Minutes, "Approve glyph changes for U+1039 MYANMAR SIGN VIRAMA and U+104E MYANMAR SYMBOL AFOREMENTIONED."
3.0	U+1000..1021, 1023..1027, 1029..102A, 102C..1032, 1036..1039, 1040..1059	78			N3353 (pdf, doc)	Umamaheswaran, V. S. (2007-10-10), "M51.24", Unconfirmed minutes of WG 2 meeting 51 Hanzhou, China; 2007-04-24/27
3.0	U+1000..1021, 1023..1027, 1029..102A, 102C..1032, 1036..1039, 1040..1059	78		L2/08-192		Stribley, Keith (2008-05-02), Comments on Myanmar Unicode introduction text
3.0	U+1000..1021, 1023..1027, 1029..102A, 102C..1032, 1036..1039, 1040..1059	78		L2/10-360		Myint, Tun (2010-09-27), Excerpts from Myanmar Spelling Dictionary
3.0	U+1000..1021, 1023..1027, 1029..102A, 102C..1032, 1036..1039, 1040..1059	78		L2/14-141		Unicode Standard Announcement Letter, 2014-05-23
3.0	U+1000..1021, 1023..1027, 1029..102A, 102C..1032, 1036..1039, 1040..1059	78		L2/14-170		Anderson, Deborah; Whistler, Ken; McGowan, Rick; Pournader, Roozbeh; Iancu, Laurențiu (2014-07-28), "16", Recommendations to UTC #140 August 2014 on Script Proposals
3.0	U+1000..1021, 1023..1027, 1029..102A, 102C..1032, 1036..1039, 1040..1059	78		L2/14-108		Hosken, Martin; Morey, Stephen (2014-08-05), Proposal to Disunify Khamti Style Letters from Myanmar
3.0	U+1000..1021, 1023..1027, 1029..102A, 102C..1032, 1036..1039, 1040..1059	78		L2/15-257		Hosken, Martin (2015-11-02), Proposal to Disunify Khamti Letters from Myanmar
3.0	U+1000..1021, 1023..1027, 1029..102A, 102C..1032, 1036..1039, 1040..1059	78		L2/15-320		Hosken, Martin (2015-11-03), Proposal to Create Variation Sequences for Khamti Characters
3.0	U+1000..1021, 1023..1027, 1029..102A, 102C..1032, 1036..1039, 1040..1059	78		L2/15-254		Moore, Lisa (2015-11-16), "Consensus 145-C23", UTC #145 Minutes, "Accept the 27 variation sequences in document L2/15-320 for Unicode version 9.0."
5.1	U+1022, 1075..1099, 109E..109F	40		L2/04-198	N2768R	Oo, Thein; Htut, Thein; Tint, Tun; Htut, Zaw; Tun, Ngwe (2004-05-19), Proposal of Myanmar Script Extensions: Mon, Shan, and Karen (Kayin)
5.1	U+1022, 1075..1099, 109E..109F	40			N2953 (pdf, doc)	Umamaheswaran, V. S. (2006-02-16), "7.4.9", Unconfirmed minutes of WG 2 meeting 47, Sophia Antipolis, France; 2005-09-12/15
5.1	U+1022, 1075..1099, 109E..109F	40		L2/06-119	N3080	Everson, Michael; Hosken, Martin (2006-04-09), Preliminary proposal for encoding Karen, Shan, and Kayah characters
5.1	U+1022, 1075..1099, 109E..109F	40		L2/06-304	N3143	Everson, Michael; Hosken, Martin (2006-09-08), Proposal for encoding Myanmar characters for Shan and Palaung in the UCS
5.1	U+1022, 1075..1099, 109E..109F	40			N3153 (pdf, doc)	Umamaheswaran, V. S. (2007-02-16), "M49.15", Unconfirmed minutes of WG 2 meeting 49 AIST, Akihabara, Tokyo, Japan; 2006-09-25/29
5.1	U+1022, 1075..1099, 109E..109F	40		L2/06-324R2		Moore, Lisa (2006-11-29), "Consensus 109-C7", UTC #109 Minutes
5.1	U+1022, 1075..1099, 109E..109F	40			N3353 (pdf, doc)	Umamaheswaran, V. S. (2007-10-10), "M51.1", Unconfirmed minutes of WG 2 meeting 51 Hanzhou, China; 2007-04-24/27
5.1	U+1022, 1075..1099, 109E..109F	40		L2/07-225		Moore, Lisa (2007-08-21), "Myanmar for Shan", UTC #112 Minutes
5.1	U+1022, 1075..1099, 109E..109F	40		L2/07-205R2	N3277R2	Everson, Michael (2007-08-28), Proposal for encoding additional Myanmar characters for Shan in the UCS
5.1	U+1022, 1075..1099, 109E..109F	40		L2/07-345		Moore, Lisa (2007-10-25), "Consensus 113-C11", UTC #113 Minutes
5.1	U+1022, 1075..1099, 109E..109F	40		L2/06-170		Wordingham, Richard (2009-05-07), Shan-Related Issues with N3080: Preliminary proposal for encoding Karen, Shan, and Kayah Characters
5.1	U+1022, 1075..1099, 109E..109F	40		L2/14-170		Anderson, Deborah; Whistler, Ken; McGowan, Rick; Pournader, Roozbeh; Iancu, Laurențiu (2014-07-28), "16", Recommendations to UTC #140 August 2014 on Script Proposals
5.1	U+1022, 1075..1099, 109E..109F	40		L2/14-108		Hosken, Martin; Morey, Stephen (2014-08-05), Proposal to Disunify Khamti Style Letters from Myanmar
5.1	U+1022, 1075..1099, 109E..109F	40		L2/15-257		Hosken, Martin (2015-11-02), Proposal to Disunify Khamti Letters from Myanmar
5.1	U+1022, 1075..1099, 109E..109F	40		L2/15-320		Hosken, Martin (2015-11-03), Proposal to Create Variation Sequences for Khamti Characters
5.1	U+1022, 1075..1099, 109E..109F	40		L2/15-254		Moore, Lisa (2015-11-16), "Consensus 145-C23", UTC #145 Minutes, "Accept the 27 variation sequences in document L2/15-320 for Unicode version 9.0."
5.1	U+1028, 1033..1034, 105A..1064	14		L2/04-273	N2827	Proposal of 4 Myanmar Semivowels, 2004-06-21
5.1	U+1028, 1033..1034, 105A..1064	14		L2/04-328		Leca, Antoine (2004-08-04), Response to Public Review Issue #37
5.1	U+1028, 1033..1034, 105A..1064	14		L2/05-216	N2966	Letter of Recommendation re Encoding of Myanmar Alphabets in Unicode, 2005-07-28
5.1	U+1028, 1033..1034, 105A..1064	14		L2/05-178		Hosken, Martin (2005-07-29), A Sgaw Karen Unicode Proposal; Extending Myanmar to Incorporate Sgaw Karen
5.1	U+1028, 1033..1034, 105A..1064	14		L2/05-184		Hosken, Martin (2005-08-01), Dissociating Myanmar Medials: A Proposal to Encode Separate Myanmar Medials
5.1	U+1028, 1033..1034, 105A..1064	14		L2/06-029		Everson, Michael (2006-03-20), Further discussion of Myanmar medials
5.1	U+1028, 1033..1034, 105A..1064	14		L2/06-085		Kai, Ka'ōnohi (2006-03-20), Myanmar issues re WG2 N3043 (L2/06-077)
5.1	U+1028, 1033..1034, 105A..1064	14		L2/06-092		Whistler, Ken (2006-03-24), Discussion of AA and TALL AA Disunification for Myanmar
5.1	U+1028, 1033..1034, 105A..1064	14		L2/06-093	N3061	Hosken, Martin (2006-03-27), Supporting Discussion for the Encoding of seven additional Myanmar Characters
5.1	U+1028, 1033..1034, 105A..1064	14		L2/06-094		Tun, Ngwe (2006-03-27), Support for Transcoding to our Myazedi Unicode Clients
5.1	U+1028, 1033..1034, 105A..1064	14		L2/06-130		Concerns Regarding WG2 N3043R, Myanmar Additions to 10646, 2006-04-06
5.1	U+1028, 1033..1034, 105A..1064	14		L2/06-078	N3044	Everson, Michael; Hosken, Martin (2006-04-08), Proposal for encoding Mon and S'gaw Karen characters in the UCS
5.1	U+1028, 1033..1034, 105A..1064	14		L2/06-118	N3079	Response to UTC contribution N3069, "Concerns Regarding WG2 N3043R, Myanmar Additions to 10646", 2006-04-08
5.1	U+1028, 1033..1034, 105A..1064	14		L2/06-140	N3099	Kolehmainen, Erkki I.; Anderson, Deborah; Everson, Michael; Freytag, Asmus; Moore, Lisa; Oo, Thein; Shih-Shyeng, Tseng; Wei, Lin-Mei; Whistler, Ken; Htut, Zaw (2006-04-26), Myanmar Ad Hoc Report
5.1	U+1028, 1033..1034, 105A..1064	14		L2/06-161		Wordingham, Richard (2006-05-05), Two Issues Relating to N3044: Proposal to encode Mon and S'gaw Karen characters
5.1	U+1028, 1033..1034, 105A..1064	14		L2/06-108		Moore, Lisa (2006-05-25), "Motion 107-M6", UTC #107 Minutes
5.1	U+1028, 1033..1034, 105A..1064	14			N3103 (pdf, doc)	Umamaheswaran, V. S. (2006-08-25), "M48.16", Unconfirmed minutes of WG 2 meeting 48, Mountain View, CA, USA; 2006-04-24/27
5.1	U+102B, 103A..103F	7		L2/02-284		Hosken, Martin (2002-07-05), Implementing Kinzi
5.1	U+102B, 103A..103F	7		L2/03-109		Nelson, Paul (2003-03-05), Examples of Burmese
5.1	U+102B, 103A..103F	7		L2/06-077R	N3043R	Everson, Michael; et al. (2006-03-01), Proposal to encode seven additional Myanmar characters in the UCS
5.1	U+102B, 103A..103F	7			N3069	Concerns Regarding WG2 N3043R, Myanmar Additions, 2006-04-06
5.1	U+102B, 103A..103F	7		L2/06-117R	N3078R	Proposed additions to ISO/IEC 10646:2003 Amendment 3, 2006-04-12
5.1	U+102B, 103A..103F	7		L2/06-213		Everson, Michael (2006-05-17), Requirements leading to the characters added to the Myanmar script
5.1	U+102B, 103A..103F	7		L2/06-108		Moore, Lisa (2006-05-25), "C.13", UTC #107 Minutes
5.1	U+102B, 103A..103F	7			N3103 (pdf, doc)	Umamaheswaran, V. S. (2006-08-25), "M48.15", Unconfirmed minutes of WG 2 meeting 48, Mountain View, CA, USA; 2006-04-24/27
5.1	U+102B, 103A..103F	7		L2/08-126		Muller, Eric (2008-03-18), UTC Letter Ballot: Myanmar in Unicode 5.1
5.1	U+102B, 103A..103F	7		L2/08-127		Muller, Eric (2008-03-18), Results: UTC Letter Ballot: Myanmar in Unicode 5.1
5.1	U+1035	1		L2/06-249	N3115	Everson, Michael; Hosken, Martin (2006-07-24), One additional Myanmar character for Mon for PDAM 3.2
5.1	U+1035	1		L2/06-231		Moore, Lisa (2006-08-17), "C.11", UTC #108 Minutes
5.1	U+1035	1			N3153 (pdf, doc)	Umamaheswaran, V. S. (2007-02-16), "M49.1a", Unconfirmed minutes of WG 2 meeting 49 AIST, Akihabara, Tokyo, Japan; 2006-09-25/29
5.1	U+1065..1074	16		L2/06-163		Wordingham, Richard (2006-05-07), Non-Shan Issues Relating to N3080: Preliminary proposal for encoding Karen, Shan, and Kayah Characters
5.1	U+1065..1074	16		L2/06-303	N3142	Everson, Michael; Hosken, Martin (2006-09-08), Proposal for encoding Myanmar characters for Karen and Kayah in the UCS
5.1	U+1065..1074	16			N3153 (pdf, doc)	Umamaheswaran, V. S. (2007-02-16), "M49.16", Unconfirmed minutes of WG 2 meeting 49 AIST, Akihabara, Tokyo, Japan; 2006-09-25/29
5.1	U+1065..1074	16		L2/06-324R2		Moore, Lisa (2006-11-29), "Consensus 109-C6", UTC #109 Minutes
5.2	U+109A..109D	4		L2/08-145	N3436	Everson, Michael (2008-04-14), Ordering and character properties for Myanmar Khamti Shan characters
5.2	U+109A..109D	4		L2/08-181R	N3423R	Hosken, Martin (2008-04-29), Proposal to add Khamti Shan Characters to the Myanmar Blocks
5.2	U+109A..109D	4		L2/08-276	N3492	Hosken, Martin (2008-08-04), Extended proposal to add Khamti Shan Characters to the Myanmar Blocks [2008.08.04]
5.2	U+109A..109D	4		L2/08-318	N3453 (pdf, doc)	Umamaheswaran, V. S. (2008-08-13), "M52.13", Unconfirmed minutes of WG 2 meeting 52
5.2	U+109A..109D	4		L2/08-253R2		Moore, Lisa (2008-08-19), "Myanmar/Khamti Shan (B15.2, E.4)", UTC #116 Minutes
5.2	U+109A..109D	4		L2/08-161R2		Moore, Lisa (2008-11-05), "Myanmar", UTC #115 Minutes
5.2	U+109A..109D	4		L2/08-412	N3553 (pdf, doc)	Umamaheswaran, V. S. (2008-11-05), "M53.04", Unconfirmed minutes of WG 2 meeting 53

== Historic and nonstandard uses of range ==
In Unicode 1.0.0, part of the current Myanmar block was used for Tibetan. In Microsoft Windows, collation data referring to the old Tibetan block was retained as late as Windows XP, and removed in Windows 2003.

In Myanmar, devices and software localisation often use Zawgyi fonts rather than Unicode-compliant fonts. These use the same range as the Unicode Myanmar block (0x1000–0x109F), and are even applied to text encoded like UTF-8 (although Zawgyi text does not officially constitute UTF-8), despite only a subset of the code points being interpreted the same way. Zawgyi lacks support for Myanmar-script languages other than Burmese, but heuristic methods exist for detecting the encoding of text which is assumed to be Burmese.

== See also ==
- Myanmar Extended-A (Unicode block)
- Myanmar Extended-B (Unicode block)
- Myanmar Extended-C (Unicode block)
