= Myanmar Extended-B =

- Range: U+A9E0..U+A9FF (32 code points)
- Plane: BMP
- Scripts: Myanmar
- Major alphabets: Pali, Tai Laing
- Assigned: 31 code points
- Unused: 1 reserved code points

Unicode version history
- 7.0 (2014): 31 (+31)

Unicode documentation
- Code chart ∣ Web page

Myanmar Extended-B is a Unicode block containing Burmese script characters for writing Pali and Tai Laing.

Myanmar Extended-B^{[1]}^{[2]} Official Unicode Consortium code chart (PDF)
	0	1	2	3	4	5	6	7	8	9	A	B	C	D	E	F
U+A9Ex	ꧠ	ꧡ	ꧢ	ꧣ	ꧤ	ꧥ	ꧦ	ꧧ	ꧨ	ꧩ	ꧪ	ꧫ	ꧬ	ꧭ	ꧮ	ꧯ
U+A9Fx	꧰	꧱	꧲	꧳	꧴	꧵	꧶	꧷	꧸	꧹	ꧺ	ꧻ	ꧼ	ꧽ	ꧾ	
Notes: 1. As of Unicode version 16.0; 2. Grey area indicates non-assigned code point

== History ==
The following Unicode-related documents record the purpose and process of defining specific characters in the Myanmar Extended-B block:

Version	Final code points (Note: Proposed code points and characters names may differ from final code points and names)	Count	L2 ID	WG2 ID	Document
7.0	U+A9E0..A9E6	7	L2/10-345	N3906	Everson, Michael (2010-09-21), Proposal for encoding seven additional Myanmar characters for Shan Pali in the UCS
7.0	U+A9E0..A9E6	7	L2/10-416R		Moore, Lisa (2010-11-09), "Consensus 125-C22", UTC #125 / L2 #222 Minutes
7.0	U+A9E0..A9E6	7		N3903 (pdf, doc)	"M57.20", Unconfirmed minutes of WG2 meeting 57, 2011-03-31
7.0	U+A9E7..A9FE	24	L2/11-130		Hosken, Martin (2011-04-19), Proposal to add minority characters to Myanmar script
7.0	U+A9E7..A9FE	24	L2/12-012	N3976	Hosken, Martin (2011-05-23), Proposal to add minority characters to Myanmar script
7.0	U+A9E7..A9FE	24	L2/11-130R	N3976R	Hosken, Martin (2012-02-11), Proposal to add minority characters to Myanmar script
7.0	U+A9E7..A9FE	24	L2/12-007		Moore, Lisa (2012-02-14), "D.7", UTC #130 / L2 #227 Minutes
7.0	U+A9E7..A9FE	24		N4253 (pdf, doc)	"M59.13", Unconfirmed minutes of WG 2 meeting 59, 2012-09-12

== See also ==
- Myanmar (Unicode block)
- Myanmar Extended-A (Unicode block)
- Myanmar Extended-C (Unicode block)
