= Myanmar Extended-C =

- Range: U+116D0..U+116FF (48 code points)
- Plane: SMP
- Scripts: Myanmar
- Assigned: 20 code points
- Unused: 28 reserved code points

Unicode version history
- 16.0 (2024): 20 (+20)

Unicode documentation
- Code chart ∣ Web page

Myanmar Extended-C is a Unicode block containing numerals for Eastern Pwo and Pa'O languages.

Myanmar Extended-C^{[1]}^{[2]} Official Unicode Consortium code chart (PDF)
	0	1	2	3	4	5	6	7	8	9	A	B	C	D	E	F
U+116Dx	𑛐	𑛑	𑛒	𑛓	𑛔	𑛕	𑛖	𑛗	𑛘	𑛙	𑛚	𑛛	𑛜	𑛝	𑛞	𑛟
U+116Ex	𑛠	𑛡	𑛢	𑛣												
U+116Fx																
Notes: 1. As of Unicode version 16.0; 2. Grey areas indicate non-assigned code points

== History ==
The following Unicode-related documents record the purpose and process of defining specific characters in the Myanmar Extended-C block:

Version	Final code points (Note: Proposed code points and characters names may differ from final code points and names)	Count	L2 ID	Document
16.0	U+116D0..116E3	20	L2/22-046	Mitchell, Ben (2022-02-21), Proposal to encode numerals for Eastern Pwo Karen and Pa'O
16.0	U+116D0..116E3	20	L2/22-068	Anderson, Deborah; Whistler, Ken; Pournader, Roozbeh; Constable, Peter (2022-04-15), "11 Myanmar", Recommendations to UTC #171 April 2022 on Script Proposals
16.0	U+116D0..116E3	20	L2/22-061	Constable, Peter (2022-07-27), "Consensus 171-C20:Accept 20 Myanmar numerals (U+116D0…U+116E3) for Eastern Pwo Karen and Pa'O", Approved Minutes of UTC Meeting 171

== See also ==
- Myanmar (Unicode block)
- Myanmar Extended-A (Unicode block)
- Myanmar Extended-B (Unicode block)
