= Myanmar Extended-A =

- Range: U+AA60..U+AA7F (32 code points)
- Plane: BMP
- Scripts: Myanmar
- Major alphabets: Khamti Shan; Aiton
- Assigned: 32 code points
- Unused: 0 reserved code points

Unicode version history
- 5.2 (2009): 28 (+28)
- 7.0 (2014): 32 (+4)

Unicode documentation
- Code chart ∣ Web page

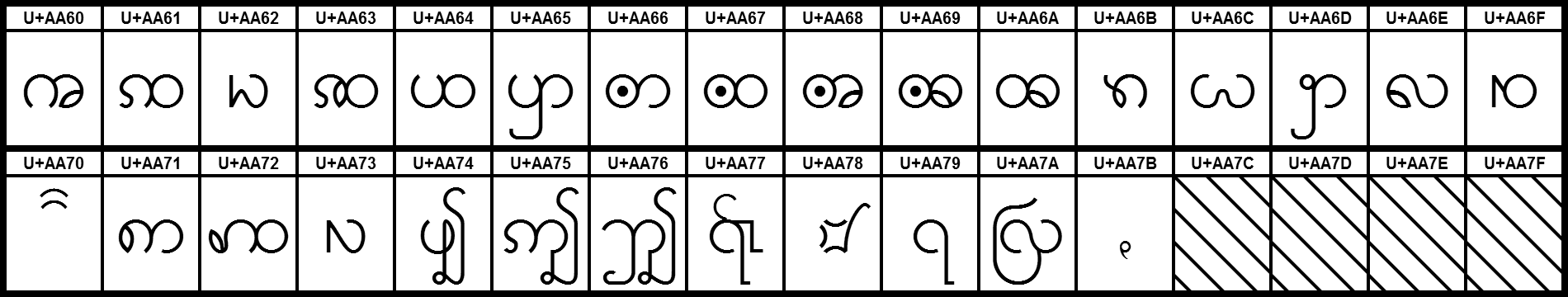
Graphical representation of the Myanmar Extended-A Unicode block. Hatched boxes indicate non-assigned code points.

Myanmar Extended-A is a Unicode block containing Myanmar characters for writing the Khamti Shan and Aiton languages.

== Block ==
Myanmar Extended-A^{[1]} Official Unicode Consortium code chart (PDF)
	0	1	2	3	4	5	6	7	8	9	A	B	C	D	E	F
U+AA6x	ꩠ	ꩡ	ꩢ	ꩣ	ꩤ	ꩥ	ꩦ	ꩧ	ꩨ	ꩩ	ꩪ	ꩫ	ꩬ	ꩭ	ꩮ	ꩯ
U+AA7x	ꩰ	ꩱ	ꩲ	ꩳ	ꩴ	ꩵ	ꩶ	꩷	꩸	꩹	ꩺ	ꩻ	ꩼ	ꩽ	ꩾ	ꩿ
Notes: 1. As of Unicode version 17.0

The block has eleven variation sequences defined for standardized variants. They use U+FE00 VARIATION SELECTOR-1 (VS01) to denote the dotted letters used for the Khamti, Aiton, and Phake languages. (Note that this is font dependent. For example, the Padauk font supports some of the dotted forms.)

Variation sequences for dotted forms
U+	AA60	AA61	AA62	AA63	AA64	AA65	AA66	AA6B	AA6C	AA6F	AA7A
base code point	ꩠ	ꩡ	ꩢ	ꩣ	ꩤ	ꩥ	ꩦ	ꩫ	ꩬ	ꩯ	ꩺ
base + VS01	ꩠ︀	ꩡ︀	ꩢ︀	ꩣ︀	ꩤ︀	ꩥ︀	ꩦ︀	ꩫ︀	ꩬ︀	ꩯ︀	ꩺ︀

== History ==
The following Unicode-related documents record the purpose and process of defining specific characters in the Myanmar Extended-A block:

Version	Final code points (Note: Proposed code points and characters names may differ from final code points and names)	Count	L2 ID	WG2 ID	Document
5.2	U+AA60..AA7A	27	L2/08-145	N3436	Everson, Michael (2008-04-14), Ordering and character properties for Myanmar Khamti Shan characters
5.2	U+AA60..AA7A	27	L2/08-181R	N3423R	Hosken, Martin (2008-04-29), Proposal to add Khamti Shan Characters to the Myanmar Blocks
5.2	U+AA60..AA7A	27	L2/08-218		Muller, Eric (2008-05-12), "3", South Asia Subcommittee Report - Monday May 12, 2008
5.2	U+AA60..AA7A	27	L2/08-276	N3492	Hosken, Martin (2008-08-04), Extended proposal to add Khamti Shan Characters to the Myanmar Blocks [2008.08.04]
5.2	U+AA60..AA7A	27	L2/08-317		Muller, Eric (2008-08-11), "4", South Asia Subcommittee Report
5.2	U+AA60..AA7A	27	L2/08-318	N3453 (pdf, doc)	Umamaheswaran, V. S. (2008-08-13), "M52.13", Unconfirmed minutes of WG 2 meeting 52
5.2	U+AA60..AA7A	27	L2/08-253R2		Moore, Lisa (2008-08-19), "Myanmar/Khamti Shan (B15.2, E.4)", UTC #116 Minutes
5.2	U+AA60..AA7A	27	L2/08-161R2		Moore, Lisa (2008-11-05), "Myanmar", UTC #115 Minutes
5.2	U+AA60..AA7A	27	L2/08-412	N3553 (pdf, doc)	Umamaheswaran, V. S. (2008-11-05), "M53.04", Unconfirmed minutes of WG 2 meeting 53
5.2	U+AA60..AA7A	27	L2/14-170		Anderson, Deborah; Whistler, Ken; McGowan, Rick; Pournader, Roozbeh; Iancu, Laurențiu (2014-07-28), "16", Recommendations to UTC #140 August 2014 on Script Proposals
5.2	U+AA60..AA7A	27	L2/14-108		Hosken, Martin; Morey, Stephen (2014-08-05), Proposal to Disunify Khamti Style Letters from Myanmar
5.2	U+AA60..AA7A	27	L2/16-163		Pournader, Roozbeh (2015-05-12), Additions to Indic Syllabic Category for Myanmar and Khmer
5.2	U+AA60..AA7A	27	L2/15-257		Hosken, Martin (2015-11-02), Proposal to Disunify Khamti Letters from Myanmar
5.2	U+AA60..AA7A	27	L2/15-320		Hosken, Martin (2015-11-03), Proposal to Create Variation Sequences for Khamti Characters
5.2	U+AA60..AA7A	27	L2/15-254		Moore, Lisa (2015-11-16), "Consensus 145-C23", UTC #145 Minutes, "Accept the 27 variation sequences in document L2/15-320 for Unicode version 9.0."
5.2	U+AA60..AA7A	27	L2/20-263		Mitchell, Ben (2020-08-14), Request for a formal name alias for uniAA6E Khamti HHA
5.2	U+AA60..AA7A	27	L2/20-250		Anderson, Deborah; Whistler, Ken; Pournader, Roozbeh; Moore, Lisa; Constable, Peter; Liang, Hai (2020-10-01), "17. Myanmar", Recommendations to UTC #165 October 2020 on Script Proposals
5.2	U+AA60..AA7A	27	L2/20-237		Moore, Lisa (2020-10-27), "Consensus 165-C19", UTC #165 Minutes, "The UTC accepts a formal name alias of type "correction" for U+AA6E MYANMAR LETTER KHAMTI HHA, for Unicode version 14.0. The formal name alias will be: MYANMAR LETTER KHAMTI LLA."
5.2	U+AA7B	1	L2/09-100R	N3594R	Everson, Michael; Hosken, Martin (2009-04-09), Proposal for encoding one additional Myanmar character for Pa'o Karen in the UCS
5.2	U+AA7B	1	L2/09-234	N3603 (pdf, doc)	Umamaheswaran, V. S. (2009-07-08), "M54.03c", Unconfirmed minutes of WG 2 meeting 54
5.2	U+AA7B	1	L2/09-104		Moore, Lisa (2009-05-20), "Consensus 119-C22", UTC #119 / L2 #216 Minutes
7.0	U+AA7C..AA7F	4	L2/11-130		Hosken, Martin (2011-04-19), Proposal to add minority characters to Myanmar script
7.0	U+AA7C..AA7F	4	L2/12-012	N3976	Hosken, Martin (2011-05-23), Proposal to add minority characters to Myanmar script
7.0	U+AA7C..AA7F	4	L2/11-130R	N3976R	Hosken, Martin (2012-02-11), Proposal to add minority characters to Myanmar script
7.0	U+AA7C..AA7F	4	L2/12-007		Moore, Lisa (2012-02-14), "D.7", UTC #130 / L2 #227 Minutes
7.0	U+AA7C..AA7F	4		N4253 (pdf, doc)	"M59.16k", Unconfirmed minutes of WG 2 meeting 59, 2012-09-12

== See also ==
- Myanmar (Unicode block)
- Myanmar Extended-B (Unicode block)
- Myanmar Extended-C (Unicode block)
