= Mon alphabet =

Brahmic abugida used for writing Mon language

Mon အက္ခရ်မန်, အခဝ်မန်;
- Script type: Abugida
- Direction: Left-to-right
- Languages: Mon language

Related scripts
- Parent systems: Proto-Sinaitic alphabet: Phoenician alphabet; Aramaic alphabet; Brāhmī; Tamil-Brahmi; Pallava script; Mon–Burmese script; Mon

Unicode
- Unicode range: U+1000–U+109F Myanmar

The Mon alphabet (Mon: အက္ခရ်မန်;, Burmese: မွန်အက္ခရာ;, Thai: อักษรมอญ) is a Brahmic abugida used for writing the Mon language. It is an example of the Mon–Burmese script, which derives from the Pallava Grantha script of southern India.

== History ==
The earliest Mon inscriptions, all undated, have been paleographically dated to the 6th century CE; they are found in Nakhon Pathom and Saraburi (in Thailand). Terracotta votive tablets found in Lower Burma have been paleographically dated to either the 6th century CE or the 11th century CE. (Note: (Pan Hla 1992: 55) dates them to the 6th century. (Stadtner 2008: 201): Luce and Shorto dated them to the 11th century.) The inscriptions were written in Grantha script. Grantha script is usually called Pallava or Kadamba. It is one of the scripts of the southern part of India in the sixth century and was the most influential script used in early Burma. The script was used in writing Pāli inscriptions, generally of the Buddhist canon, that had been found in both the Mon ancient city Thaton and Pyu ancient city Śrī Kşetra. The modern Mon and Burman scripts evolved from this Grantha script. The way it developed was very similar to the early Kawi script in Old Java. The Pallava-Grantha script in Java developed into the so-called early Kawi script in the 8th century CE But Aung-Thwin argues that there is no extant evidence or linguistic proof linking the Old Dvaravati Mon script and the Burma Mon script.

A number of Mon stone inscriptions have been found in Thaton and its environs, Lower Burma. They are all undated. H. L. Shorto and other scholars assigned them to the eleventh century, but they could possibly be earlier. According to linguistic analyses of the inscriptions all of them belong to Old Mon: especially the inscription on the robe of a statue at Kawgun Cave and two important inscriptions Trāp and Panḍit. Its writing style is very similar to the Dinaya inscription of 760 CE, written in Sanskrit, with the Kawi script of Old Java. Those inscriptions grammatically and linguistically belong to Old Mon. Old Mon is dated to around the 5th to the 12th century CE. During this period the Mon writing characters can similarly be divided into two or three types, but the language was not much different. For example, the word for seven from Phra Pathom inscription (6th century) is duṁpoh, from Pagan (12th century) also (duṁpoh ဒုံပေါဟ်). In the period from the late 12th to the early 13th century, Old Mon gradually transformed through language contact into Middle Mon. Middle Mon was characterized by the Great Vowel Shift, in which the long vowels of Old Mon changed to short vowels. For example, the word 'duṁpoh ဒုံပေါဟ်' (for seven) became 'thapah ထပဟ်'. The long vowel 'uṁ' was shifted.

== Alphabet ==
The calligraphy of modern Mon script follows that of modern Burmese. Burmese calligraphy originally followed a square format but the cursive format took hold in the 17th century when popular writing led to the wider use of palm leaves and folded paper known as parabaiks. The script has undergone considerable modification to suit the evolving phonology of the Burmese language, but additional letters and diacritics have been added to adapt it to other languages; the Shan and Karen alphabets, for example, require additional tone markers.

Old Mon Pali script	Modern Mon Pali script	IPA pronunciation	Translated into modern Mon script	Translate
	အနေကဇာတိသံသရံသန္ဓဝံသံအနိဗ္ဗိဿံ	(/ɑ̆ nè jɛ̀ɑ tæ̆ sɔm sɑ̆ rɔ̀m sɑndhɛ̀ɑ wĭ̀ sɑm ɑ̆ nɛ̀pbɛ̀p sɔm/)	က္ၜဳဒၞာဲဗောဓိသတ်ပိုဲမကးသ္အးကၠေံသော် က္ဍိုပ်ကောန်တၠတုဲ၊ တ္ၜးကၠေံဗွိုက် လ္တက်ကယျိုၚ်ရသိ။	The river where the Bodhisatta shaved his head and put on ascetic dress.

The modern Mon alphabet has several letters and diacritics that do not exist in Burmese, such as the stacking diacritic for medial 'l', which is placed underneath the letter. There is a great deal of discrepancy between the written and spoken forms of Mon, with a single pronunciation capable of having several spellings. The Mon script also makes prominent use of consonant stacking, to represent consonant clusters found in the language.

=== Vowels ===
Mon uses the same diacritics and diacritic combinations as in Burmese to represent vowels, with the addition of a few diacritics unique to the Mon script, including ဴ (/ɛ̀a/), and ဳ (/i/), since the diacritic ိ represents /ìˀ/. Also, ဨ (/e/) is used instead of ဧ, as in Burmese.

==== Main vowels and diphthongs ====
Syllable-initial letter	Consonant diacritic	Value after clear consonant	Value after breathy consonant
အ	none (inherent vowel)	/aˀ/	/ɛ̀ˀ/ (/ɛ̤ˀ/)
အာ	ာ (written ါ after certain consonants)	/a/	/ɛ̀a/ (/ɛ̤a/)
ဣ	ိ	/ɔeˀ/	/ìˀ/ (/i̤ˀ/)
ဣဳ	ဳ	/i/	/ì/ (/i̤/)
ဥ	ု	/aoˀ/	/ùˀ/
ဥူ	ူ	/ao/	/ù/ (/ṳ/)
ဨ	ေ	/e/	/è/
အဲ	ဲ	/oa/	/òa/
ဩ	ော (written ေါ after certain consonants)	/ao/	/ɜ̀/
အဴ‌‍‍	ဴ	/ao/	/ɛ̀a/ (/ɛ̤a/)
အံ‌‍‍	ံ	/ɔm/, /ɔˀ/	/òm/, /òˀ/
အး	း	/ah/	/ɛ̀h/ (/ɛ̤h/)

Method of combination of the Mon compound consonant surds with the vowels. With (11) Compound consonant sounds, surds (sharp).

Exam; ကၞ ၊ ကၟ၊ ကျ၊ ကြ၊ ကၠ ၊ ကွ ၊ က္စ၊ တ္ၚ၊ က္ည၊ ညှ၊ ဏှ၊ နှ၊ မှ၊ ယှ၊ ရှ၊ လှ၊ သှ။

Consonant	Compound consonant surds symbol	Consonant + compound consonant surds	The nearest phonetic sound
ၚ	-္ၚ	စ + -္ၚ + = စ္ၚ	cəŋɑ̆
ည	-္ည	က + -္ည + = က္ည	kəɲɑ̆
ဍ	-္ဍ	က + -္ဍ + = က္ဍ	kəɗɑ̆
န	-ၞ	က + -ၞ + = ကၞ	kənɑ̆
မ	-ၟ	က + -ၟ + = ကၟ	kəmɑ̆
ယ	-ျ	က + -ျ + = ကျ	kjɑ̆
ရ	-ြ	က + -ြ + = ကြ	krɑ̆
လ	-ၠ	က + -ၠ + = ကၠ	klɑ̆
ဝ	-ွ	က + -ွ + = ကွ	kwɑ̆
စ	-္စ	က + -္စ = က္စ	kəpɑ̆
ဟ	-ှ	က + -ှ = ကှ	khɑ̆
ဟ	-ှ	ည + -ှ = ညှ	hnɑ̆
ဟ	-ှ	ဏ + -ှ = ဏှ	hnɑ̆
ဟ	-ှ	န + -ှ = နှ	hnɑ̆
ဟ	-ှ	မ + -ှ = မှ	hmɑ̆
ဟ	-ှ	ယ + -ှ = ယှ	hyɑ̆
ဟ	-ှ	ရ + -ှ = ရှ	rhɑ̆
ဟ	-ှ	လ + -ှ = လှ	hlɑ̆
ဟ	-ှ	သ + -ှ = သှ	shɑ̆

==== Other vowels and diphthongs ====
Consonant diacritic	Value after clear consonant	Value after breathy consonant
ို	/ɒ/	/ə̤/, /a̤/
ာံ	/am/	/èm/
ုံ	/um/	/ùm/
ေံ	/em/, /eˀ/, /eh/	/èm/, /èˀ/
ောံ	/om/	/òm/
ီ	/ɛm/	/ìm/
ီု	/ɒm/	/ɜ̀m/
ာဲ	/ai/	
ုဲ		
ေဲ	/ea/	/ɛ̀a/
ောဲ	?	
ိုဲ	/oj/	
ဵု	/ɒ/	/ɜ̀/

Watch the video below to see the pronunciation produced when -ာ ၊ -ိ ၊ -ဳ ၊ -ု ၊ -ူ ၊ -ေ ၊ -ဲ ၊ -ါ ၊ -ဴ ၊ -ံ ၊ -း and consonants are combined.

=== Consonants ===
The Mon alphabet contains 35 consonants (including a zero consonant), as follows:

က k IPA: kaˀ	ခ kh IPA: kʰaˀ	ဂ g IPA: kɛ̤ˀ	ဃ gh IPA: kʰɛ̤ˀ	ၚ ṅ IPA: ŋɛ̤ˀ
စ c IPA: caˀ	ဆ ch IPA: cʰaˀ	ဇ j IPA: cɛ̤ˀ	ၛ jh IPA: cʰɛ̤ˀ	ဉည ñ IPA: ɲɛ̤ˀ
ဋ ṭ IPA: taˀ	ဌ ṭh IPA: tʰaˀ	ဍ ḍ IPA: ɗaˀ	ဎ ḍh IPA: tʰɛ̤ˀ	ဏ ṇ IPA: naˀ
တ t IPA: taˀ	ထ th IPA: tʰaˀ	ဒ d IPA: tɛ̤ˀ	ဓ dh IPA: tʰɛ̤ˀ	န n IPA: nɛ̤ˀ
ပ p IPA: paˀ	ဖ ph IPA: pʰaˀ	ဗ b IPA: pɛ̤ˀ	ဘ bh IPA: pʰɛ̤ˀ	မ m IPA: mɛ̤ˀ
ယ y IPA: jɛ̤ˀ	ရ r IPA: rɛ̤ˀ	လ l IPA: lɛ̤ˀ	ဝ w IPA: wɛ̤ˀ	သ s IPA: saˀ
ဟ h IPA: haˀ	ဠ ḷ IPA: laˀ	ၜ ṗ IPA: ɓaˀ	အ a IPA: ʔaˀ	ၝ ḅ IPA: ɓɛ̤ˀ

- consonants belonging to the breathy register are indicated in gold

In the Mon script, consonants belong to one of two registers: clear and breathy, each of which has different inherent vowels and pronunciations for the same set of diacritics. For instance, က, which belongs to the clear register, is pronounced /kaˀ/, while ဂ is pronounced /kɛ̤ˀ/, to accommodate the vowel complexity of the Mon phonology. The addition of diacritics makes this obvious. Whereas in Burmese spellings with the same diacritics are rhyming, in Mon this depends on the consonant's inherent register. A few examples are listed below:

- က + ဳ → ကဳ, pronounced /ki/
- ဂ + ဳ → ဂဳ, pronounced /ki̤/
- က + ူ → ကူ, pronounced /kao/
- ဂ + ူ → ဂူ, pronounced /kṳ/

The Mon language has 8 medials, as follows: ္ၚ (/-ŋ-/), ၞ (/-n-/), ၟ (/-m-/), ျ (/-j-/), ြ (/-r-/), ၠ (/-l-/), ွ (/-w-/), and ှ (/-h-/).

Consonantal finals are indicated with a virama (်), as in Burmese: however, instead of being pronounced as glottal stops as in Burmese, final plosives usually keep their respective pronunciations. Furthermore, consonant stacking is possible in Mon spellings, particularly for Pali and Sanskrit-derived vocabulary.

=== Punctuation ===
Diacritic	Transcription and notes
၊	comma ပိုဒ်ဒုင် (in Mon)
။	period ပိုဒ်ဒ (in Mon)

== Unicode ==
The Mon script has been encoded as a part of the Myanmar block with the release version of Unicode 3.0.

Myanmar^{[1]} Official Unicode Consortium code chart (PDF)
	0	1	2	3	4	5	6	7	8	9	A	B	C	D	E	F
U+100x	က	ခ	ဂ	ဃ	င	စ	ဆ	ဇ	ဈ	ဉ	ည	ဋ	ဌ	ဍ	ဎ	ဏ
U+101x	တ	ထ	ဒ	ဓ	န	ပ	ဖ	ဗ	ဘ	မ	ယ	ရ	လ	ဝ	သ	ဟ
U+102x	ဠ	အ	ဢ	ဣ	ဤ	ဥ	ဦ	ဧ	ဨ	ဩ	ဪ	ါ	ာ	ိ	ီ	ု
U+103x	ူ	ေ	ဲ	ဳ	ဴ	ဵ	ံ	့	း	္	်	ျ	ြ	ွ	ှ	ဿ
U+104x	၀	၁	၂	၃	၄	၅	၆	၇	၈	၉	၊	။	၌	၍	၎	၏
U+105x	ၐ	ၑ	ၒ	ၓ	ၔ	ၕ	ၖ	ၗ	ၘ	ၙ	ၚ	ၛ	ၜ	ၝ	ၞ	ၟ
U+106x	ၠ	ၡ	ၢ	ၣ	ၤ	ၥ	ၦ	ၧ	ၨ	ၩ	ၪ	ၫ	ၬ	ၭ	ၮ	ၯ
U+107x	ၰ	ၱ	ၲ	ၳ	ၴ	ၵ	ၶ	ၷ	ၸ	ၹ	ၺ	ၻ	ၼ	ၽ	ၾ	ၿ
U+108x	ႀ	ႁ	ႂ	ႃ	ႄ	ႅ	ႆ	ႇ	ႈ	ႉ	ႊ	ႋ	ႌ	ႍ	ႎ	ႏ
U+109x	႐	႑	႒	႓	႔	႕	႖	႗	႘	႙	ႚ	ႛ	ႜ	ႝ	႞	႟
Notes 1.As of Unicode version 18.0

== Four types of Mon writing ==
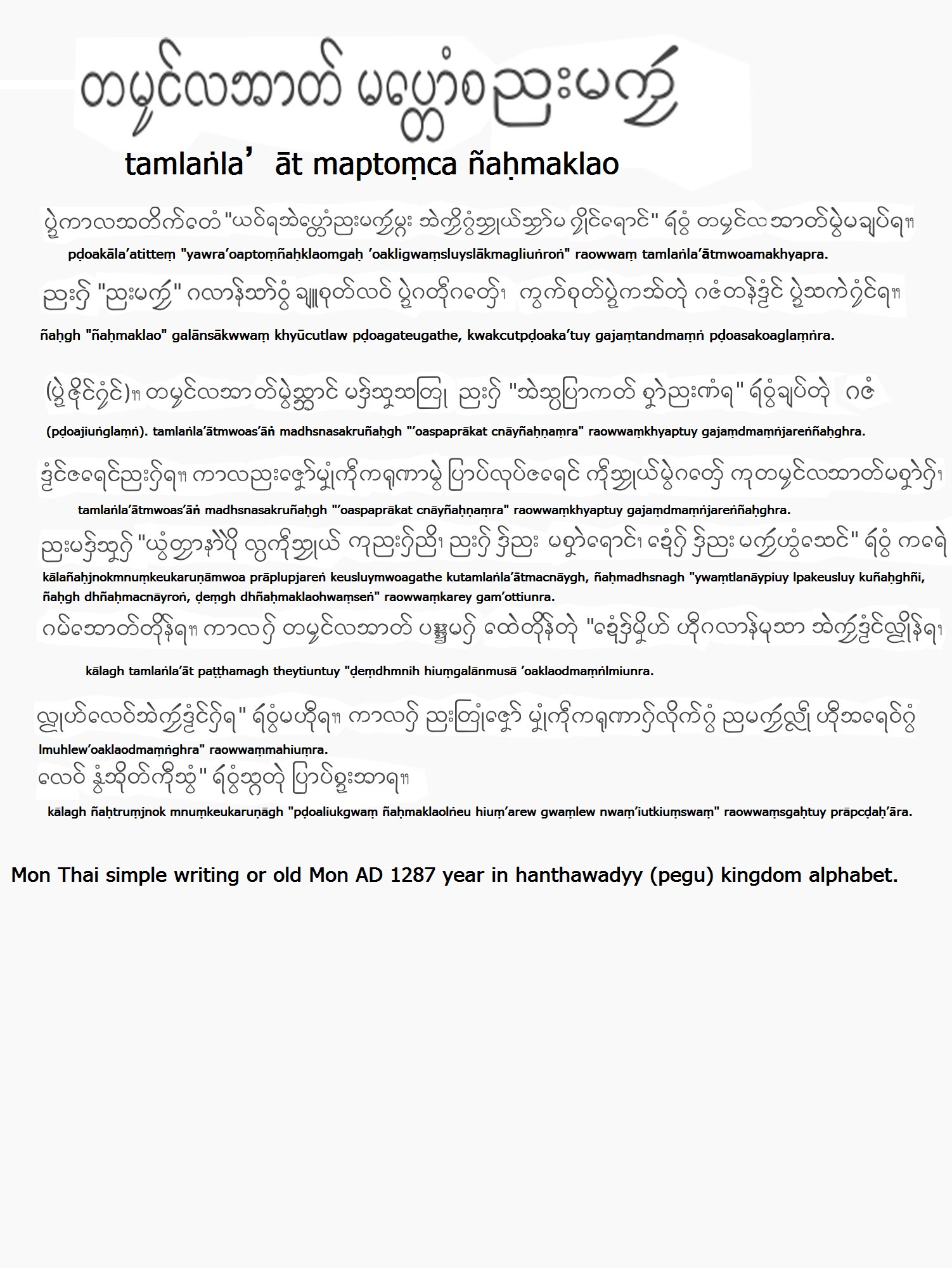

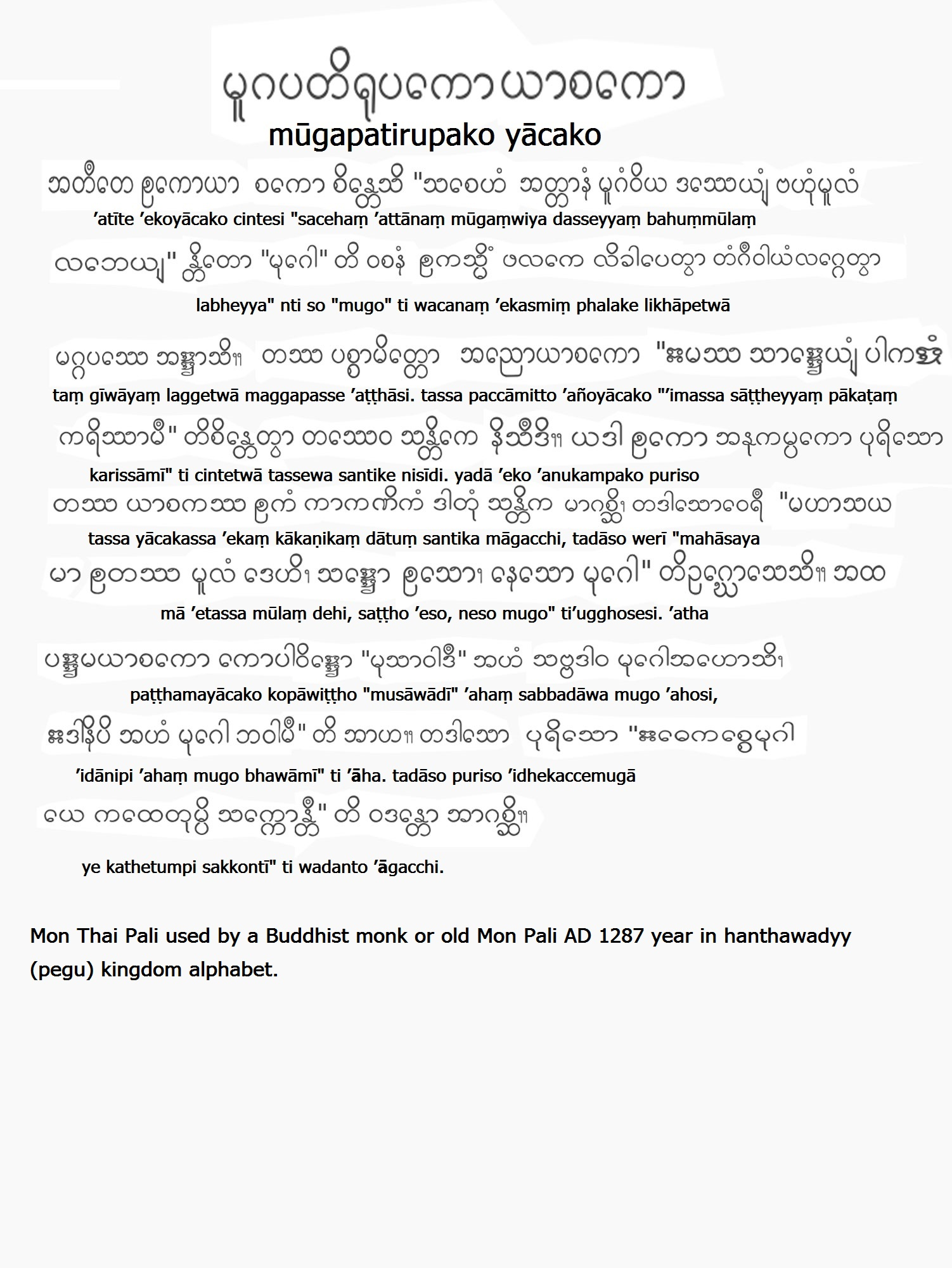

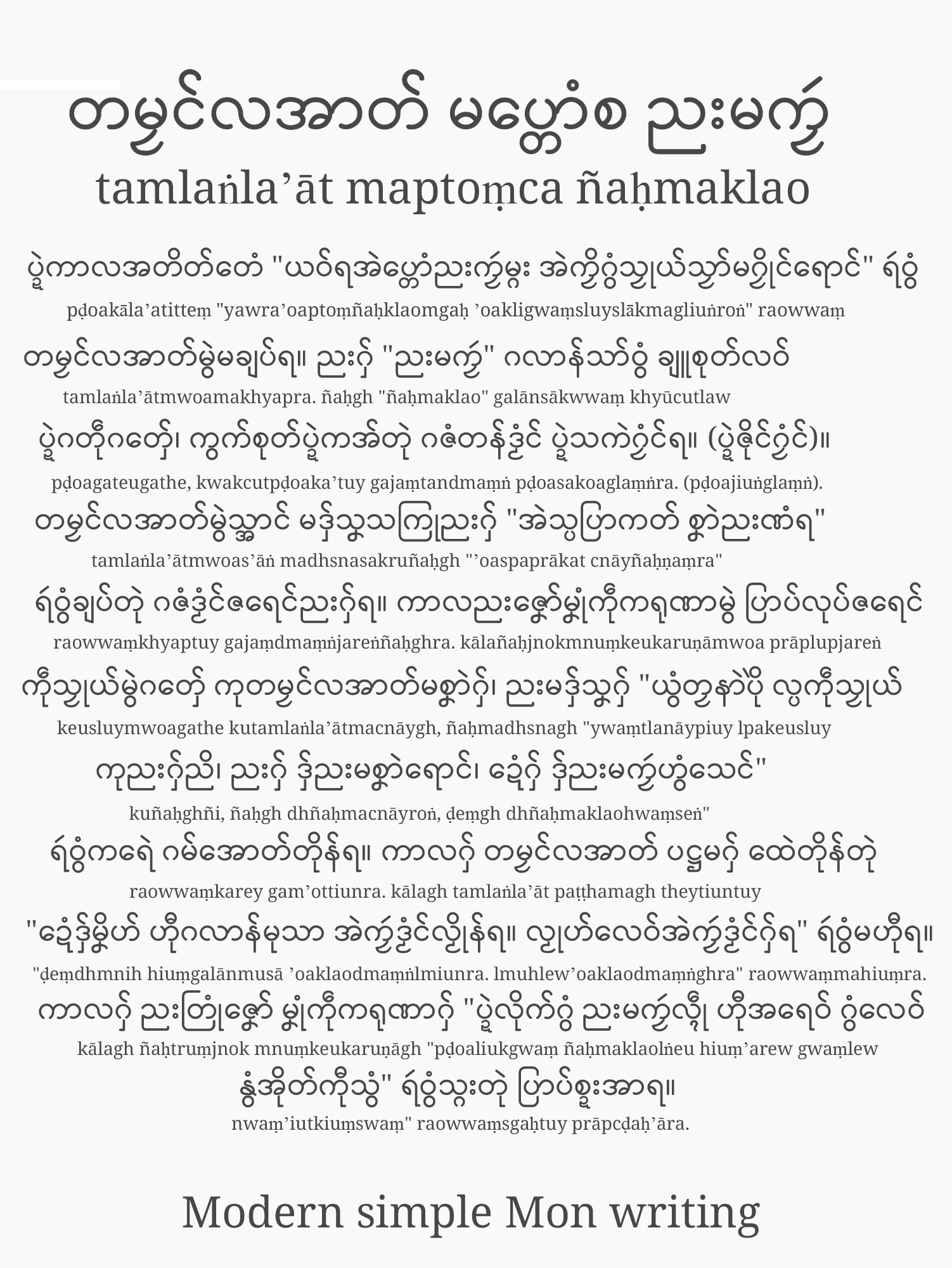

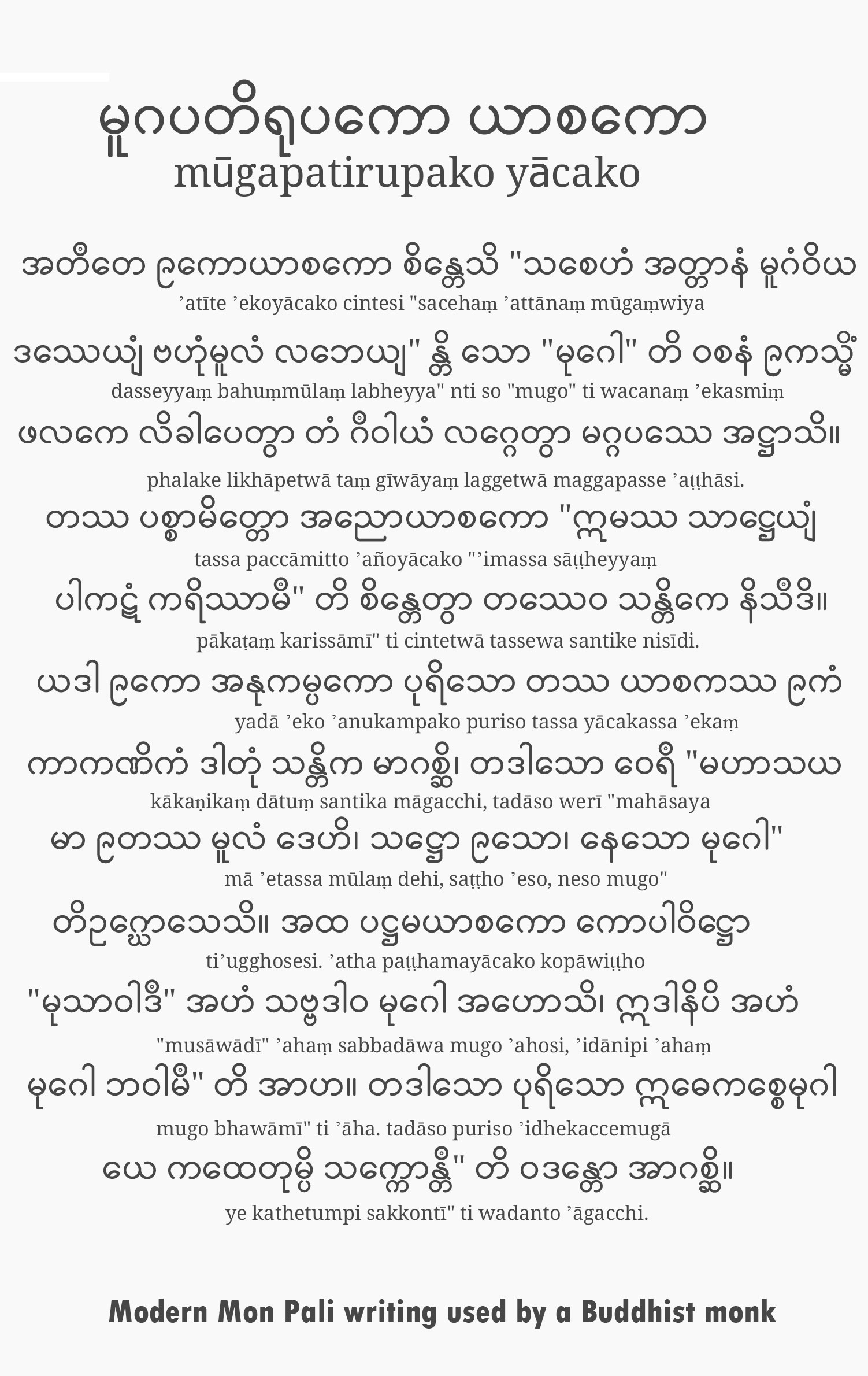

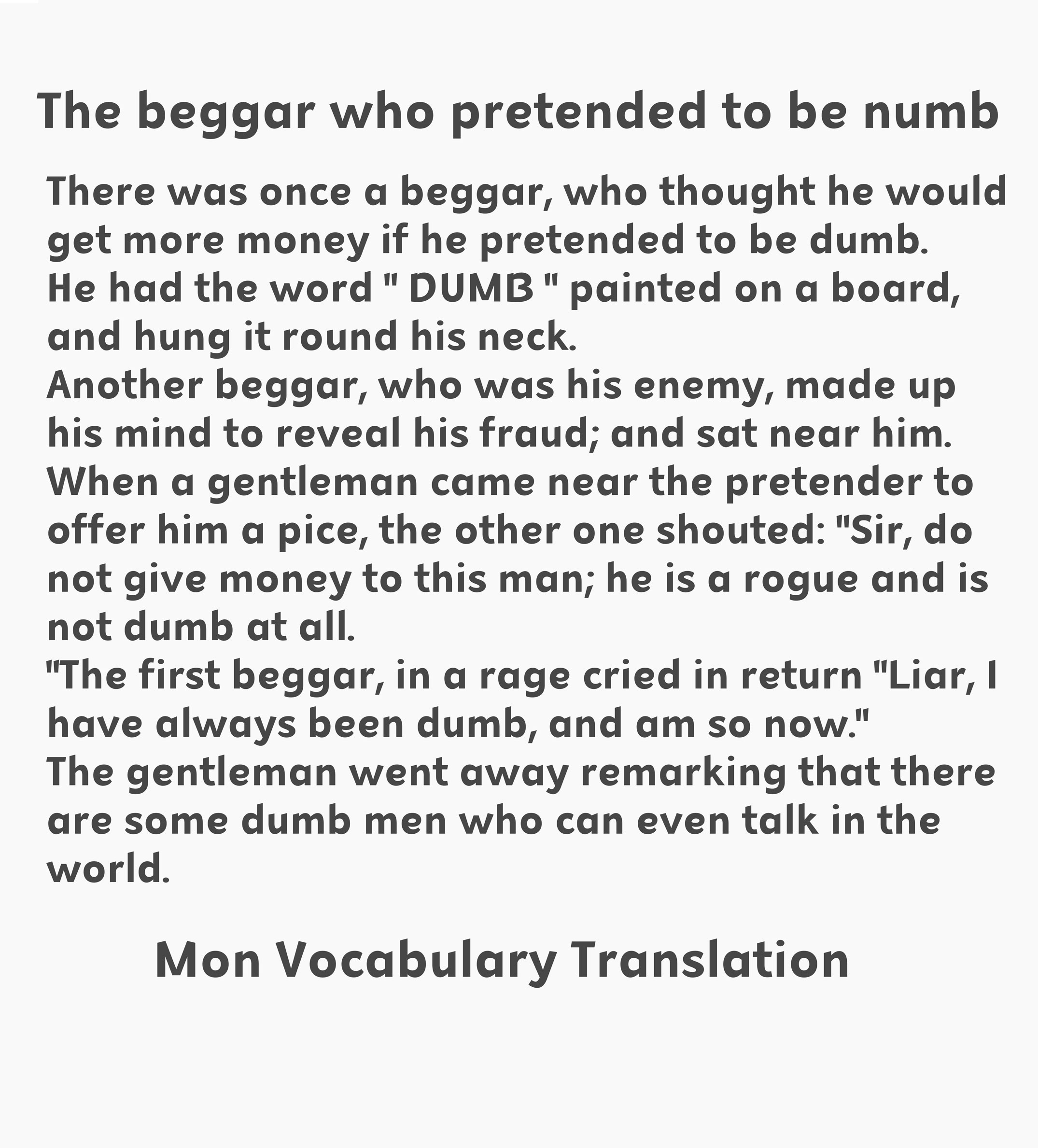

== Gallery ==
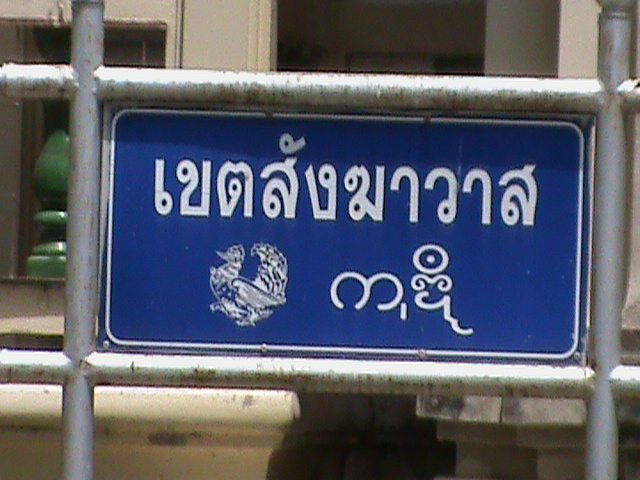
Thai Mon language and Thai language

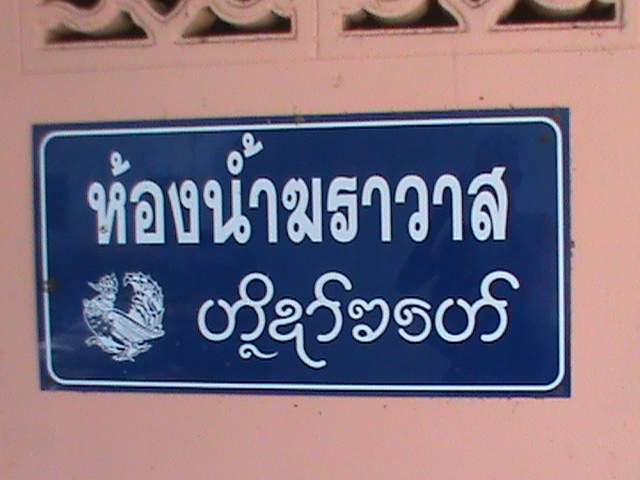
Thai Mon language and Thai language in Wat Muang

== Bibliography ==
- Aung-Thwin, Michael (2005). The mists of Rāmañña: The Legend that was Lower Burma (illustrated ed.). Honolulu: University of Hawai'i Press. ISBN 9780824828868.
- Bauer, Christian (1991). "Notes on Mon Epigraphy". Journal of the Siam Society. 79 (1).
- Lieberman, Victor B. (2003). Strange Parallels: Southeast Asia in Global Context, c. 800–1830, volume 1, Integration on the Mainland. Cambridge University Press. p. 136. ISBN 978-0-521-80496-7.
- Pan Hla, Nai (1992). The Significati Role of the Mon Language and culture in Southeast Asia, Part I. Japan: Institute for the Study of Languages and Cultures of Asia and Africa (ILCAA).
- Stadtner, Donald M. (2008). "The Mon of Lower Burma". Journal of the Siam Society. 96: 198.
- Sawada, Hideo (2013). "Some Properties of Burmese Script" (PDF). Archived from the original (PDF) on 2016-10-20.
