= Thein Oo =

Burmese businessman (born 1948)

U Thein Oo
- သိန်းဦး
- Born: 12 May 1948 (age 77)
- Occupation: ကျောင်းဆရာ (Teacher) ဆရာကျောင်း

Thein Oo (Burmese: သိန်းဦး;)(Born 12 May 1948) is a businessman in Myanmar's computer industry, President of the Myanmar Computer Federation (a semi-governmental Nonprofit organization) and also the president of ACE Data Systems, (ACE Group of companies.)
