= S'gaw Karen alphabet =

Writing system

S'gaw Karen ကညီလံာ်ခီၣ်ထံး
- Script type: Abugida
- Period: 1830–present
- Languages: S'gaw Karen language ksw

Related scripts
- Parent systems: Proto-Sinaitic alphabet: Phoenician alphabet; Aramaic alphabet; Brahmi script; Pallava script; Mon-Burmese; S'gaw Karen

ISO 15924
- ISO 15924: Mymr (350), Myanmar (Burmese)

Unicode
- Unicode alias: Myanmar
- Unicode range: Myanmar-Karen-Sgaw

The S'gaw Karen alphabet (S'gaw Karen: ကညီလံာ်ခီၣ်ထံး) is an abugida used for writing S'gaw Karen. It was created in the early 1830s based on the Burmese script, which derives from either the Kadamba or Pallava alphabet of South India. The S'gaw Karen alphabet is also used for the liturgical languages of Pali and Sanskrit.

== Alphabet ==
The Karen alphabet was created by American missionary Jonathan Wade in the 1830s, based on the S'gaw Karen language; Wade was assisted by a Karen named Paulah. The consonants and most of the vowels are adopted from the Burmese alphabet; however, the Karen pronunciation of the letters is slightly different from that of the Burmese alphabet. Since Karen has more tones than Burmese, additional tonal markers were added.

The script is taught in the refugee camps in Thailand and in Kayin State.

Grouped consonants
က k IPA: [k]	ခ kh IPA: [kʰ]	ဂ gh IPA: [ɣ]	ဃ x IPA: [x]	င ng IPA: [ŋ]
စ s IPA: [s]	ဆ hs IPA: [sʰ]		ၡ sh IPA: [ʃ]	ည ny IPA: [ɲ]
တ t IPA: [t]	ထ ht IPA: [tʰ]	ဒ d IPA: [d]		န n IPA: [n]
ပ p IPA: [p]	ဖ hp IPA: [pʰ]	ဘ b IPA: [b]		မ m IPA: [m]

Miscellaneous consonants
ယ y IPA: [j]	ရ r IPA: [r]	လ l IPA: [l]	ဝ w IPA: [w]	သ th IPA: [θ]
ဟ h IPA: [h]	အ vowel holder IPA: [ʔ]	ဧ ahh IPA: [ɦ]		

Vowels
ါ ah IPA: [a]	ံ ee IPA: [i]	ၢ uh IPA: [ə]	ု u IPA: [ɨ~ɯ]	ူ oo IPA: [u]	့ ae or ay IPA: [e]	ဲ eh IPA: [ɛ]	ိ oh IPA: [o]	ီ aw IPA: [ɔ]

Tones
ှၢ် rising	ှာ် falling	ှး mid	ှၣ် high	ှၤ low

Medials	S'gaw Karen
ှ hg IPA: [ɣ]	ဂ
ၠ y IPA: [j]	ယ
ြ r IPA: [r~ɹ]	ရ
ျ l IPA: [l]	လ
ွ w IPA: [w]	ဝ

== Numerals ==
0 ၀ wa IPA: wa	1 ၁ tə IPA: tə	2 ၂ kʰi IPA: kʰi	3 ၃ the IPA: θə	4 ၄ lwi IPA: lwi	5 ၅ jɛ IPA: jɛ	6 ၆ xɯ IPA: xɯ	7 ၇ nwi IPA: nwi	8 ၈ xo IPA: xo	9 ၉ kʰwi IPA: kʰwi	10 ၁၀ təsʰi IPA: təsʰi

The number 1962 would be written as ၁၉၆၂.
