= List of Tai ethnic groups in India =

The following is a list of Tai ethnic groups in India.

- Ahom
- Phake
- Khamti
- Aiton
- Khamyang
- Turung
- Lai
