= Khamyang people =

Subgroup of the Tai peoples of Southeast Asia

Tai-Khamyang
Total population
- c. 7000

Regions with significant populations
- Assam, Arunachal Pradesh

Languages
- Khamyang, Assamese

Religion
- Theravada Buddhism

Related ethnic groups
- (Thai people, Lao people, Shan people, Dai people, Zhuang people)

Khamyang people

Thai name
- Thai: ไทคำยัง

The Khamyang ( တ︀ႆ︀းၵ︀ံးယ︀င︀်း) is a subgroup of the Tai peoples of Southeast Asia. They are numerically a small indigenous group found in Tinsukia, Jorhat, Sivasagar and Golaghat districts of Assam, and adjacent parts of Arunachal Pradesh. Their population totals about 7,000, of which only a small minority speak the native Tai Khamyang language while the vast majority speak the Assamese language. The Khamyang are followers of Theravada Buddhism and are closely related to the Khamti. They maintain good relations with other Tai Buddhist tribes of Assam.

They ruled an independent principality in Mungkong until the end of the 18th century. Many Khamyang have historically used "Shyam", which is a cognate with "Siam", the old word for Thailand, as a surname. The modern trend is for mostly their family names: Thaomung, Chowlu, Chowlik, Tungkhang, Wailong, Pangyok, Chowsong and Chowhai.

== Distribution ==
The Khamyang, as a distinct tribe, are found in Balijaan Shyam Gaon, Na Shyam Gaon and Betbari Shyam Gaon (Betoni) near Titabor in Jorhat district, Disangpani, Chalapather Shyam Gaon and Rahan Shyam Gaon near Sapekhati in Sivasagar District, Pawaimukh khamyang Gaon near Margherita in Tinsukia district and Rajmai Shyam Gaon near Sarupathar and Rajapukhuri Shyam Gaon Golaghat District.

Tai Khamyang people are also found in some villages of Namsai District and Lohit District of Arunachal Pradesh.

== Etymology ==
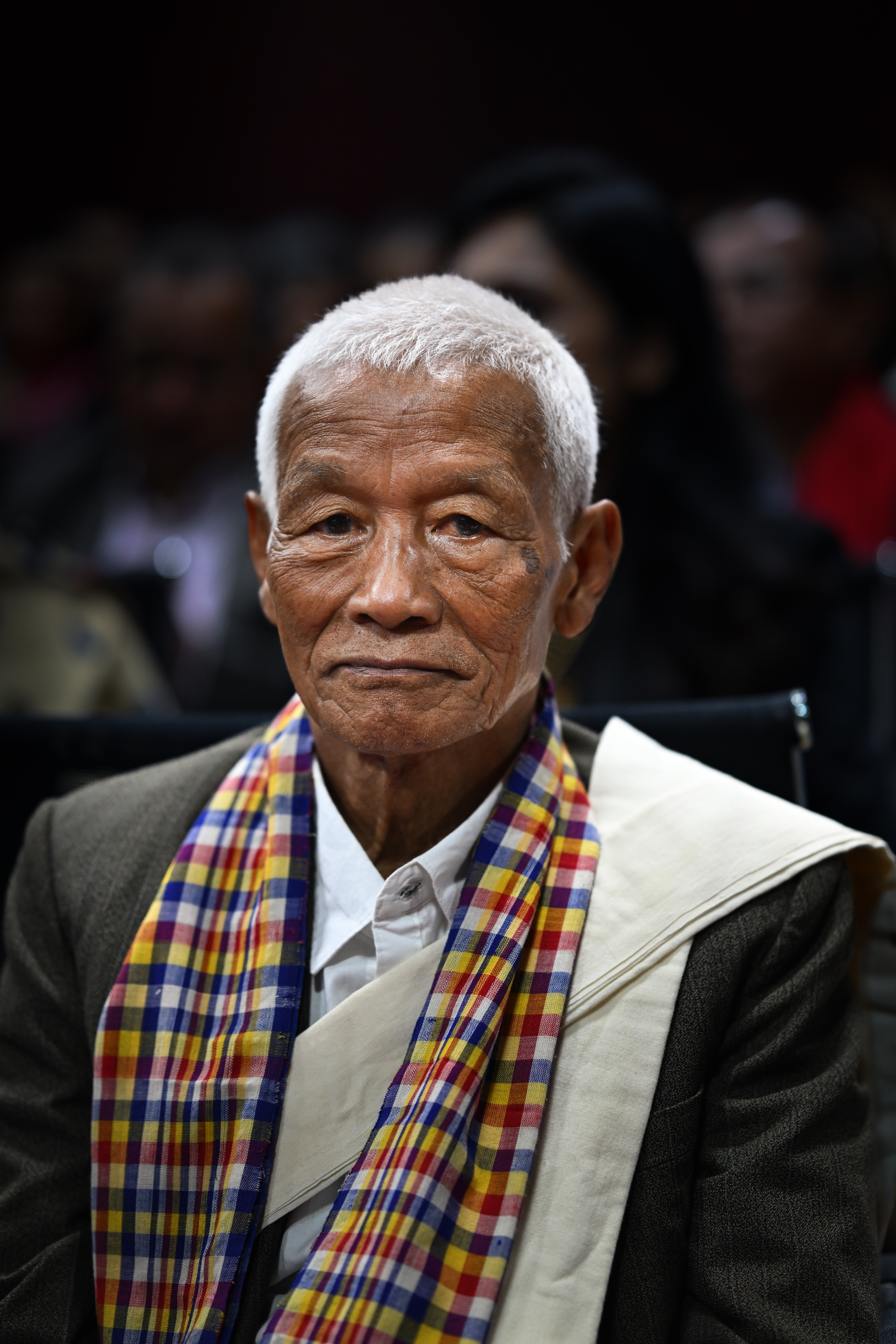
Bhogeswar Thomung, an 84 year-old lay Buddhist priest from Assam is believed to be one of the last person able to speak the Tai Khayang language Fluently.

"Khamyang" itself is a Tai word, deriving etymologically from "kham" (gold) and "yang" or "jang" (to have), and meaning "people having gold".

== Language ==
The Khamyang language, along with its close relatives, Khamti, Tai Phake, Turung, Tai Aiton and Shan, is classified with the Northwestern subgrouping of the Southwestern Tai languages in the Tai-Kadai language family. Khamyang as a language has an estimated 15 speakers, mostly elderly, remaining in Northeast India, across 8 villages. The majority speak the Assamese language although many Khamyang (Tai) terms are still retained in their vocabulary. There are also few Tai Khamyang people in Arunachal Pradesh who speak the Tai Khamti language.

Various efforts are undergoing for the effective revival of Tai-Khamyang language by workshops, publishing souvenir, compiling textbooks, etc.

== History ==
The territory of Möng Mao in the heyday of the Si Kefa period

According to the Khamyang Chronicle, the Khamyangs first came into Assam in the time of Sukaphaa, then went back to the Patkai mountains and founded a settlement near the Nong Yang Lake, which they derive their name from.

In the Ahom chronicles, prince Sukhapha and his followers were attacked by the Nagas at Khamyang on their way over Patkai. After his crossing over the Patkai, the Tai Khamyang were driven away to take refuge in Assam under the oppressions of Siukhanpha. It is that early settlement of the section of Noras who was subsequently known by that name.

The Tai Khamyang, in the Patkai, got divided into two groups namely the Maan Nam or Pani Nora (Low Land Nora) and Maan Loi or Dum Nora (Upper land Nora). This settlement lies near the great lake "The Lake Of No Return" (Nong Kheo Lok Yang). In the mid-eighteenth century, due to the criticism surrounding for the presence of a couple of Cobras in the lake and problems faced from the Kachins, the Tai-Khamyangs crossed over the Patkai hill and settled in a fertile valley of Arunachal Pradesh. It is said that they constructed a pagoda which is still present near the no return lake. In the later period, they maintained good relationships with the Tai-Khamtis and established villages in Tengapani area. During the rule of Ahom king Gaurinath Singha, they immigrants to Jorhat district of Assam. With regard to their earlier migration to Assam, it may be noted that some Noras had accompanied Swargadeo Sukhapha and later on their separate identities were merged with the name Khamyang. History bears testimony to the fact that in 1524 Swargadeo Chukungmong married the daughter of the Nora Raja and Nora Raja equally was honored with a Khamyang damsel. It is quite probable that some Noras might have accompanied the princess in 1576. Swargadeo Chukhamfa also married one Nora princess. The princess was accompanied by a Nora prince, a priest, and 1000 Nora people.

== Culture ==
=== Festivals & Events ===
- Poi-Sangken (Water Festival) used to be celebrated generally from 14 April to 16 April at all the Buddhist Monasteries across the places populated by Tai Khamyang community along with other communities. The Poi or festival is a spring festival of Tai Buddhist of the world. The word is originated from the Pali/Sanskrit word Sangkranti and this festival is observed by Tais (Thai) of Thailand and Myanmar simultaneously by following same Tai Buddhist calendar. The Poi Sanken festival starts on the day of and continues for three days. During the festival the statues of Lord Buddha are showered with clean and scented water. However on the closing day of this ceremony people start splashing water and mud on each other. The Tai peoples believe that throwing water at each other will wash away enmity and sin of the society.
- Mai-Ko-Sum-Phai is another important festival observed by the Tai Khamyang community of Assam. It is observed on the full moon day of the Assamese month Magh (Maghi Purnima). This festival is observed by firing woods and significance of which is impermanence (Anitya-Dukha-Anatma). During the festival the Tai Khamyang people prepare traditional food and offer it to each other.
- Buddha Purnima (Poi Puthi Kham) is observed on the fool moon day of the Assamese month Baisakh. The significance of this day is related to the three great events which are, birth, death and getting enlightenment of Buddha.
- Barsha Bash (Nau waa saam luen / satang) / Monsoon Fast starts from full moon of 'Ahara' to the fool moon of 'Ahina'. During the festival Buddhist Monks (Bhante) and follower of Eight Precepts visit Monastery (Kyong) for prayer and undertake fast for three month. The starting day of Barsha Bash is Called Satang Khaw Wa and ending day is called Satang Akwa.
- There are some other festivals like Poi Patesa (Kalpataru), Poi Lu Fra, Poi Kanta Sangha, Poi Lu Kyong and Poi Kathin Sivara etc.
