= Turung =

Turung may refer to:

- Turung people, a people of north-east India
- Turung language, the Tibeto-Burman language they speak
