= Tai Aiton =

Tai Aiton can refer to:

- Tai Aiton language
- Tai Aiton people
