= Khamyang =

Khamyang may refer to:

- Khamyang language, spoken in the Buri Dihing Valley of Assam, India. It may be identical to the "Nora language" mentioned by Grierson in 1904
- Khamyang people, a tribal group found primarily in Tinsukia, Jorhat and Sivasagar districts of Assam as well as adjacent parts of Arunachal Pradesh.Namsai Chongkham

== Copy and Paste stuff ==
- Only use these if applicable (i.e. you checked)
