= Pai Tang – Step of Hope =

Indian feature film

- Directed by: Prabal Khaund
- Written by: Prabal Khaund
- Produced by: Naba Kumar Bhuyan
- Starring: Homsen Pomung Weingken; Nuk Chen Weingken; Nongun Weingken
- Release date: 2023
- Country: India
- Language: Tai Phake

Pai Tang – Step of Hope is a 2023 Indian feature film in the Tai Phake language, directed by Prabal Khaund and produced by Naba Kumar Bhuyan. The film is among the few feature-length productions made in the Tai Phake language which is spoken by a minority community in the Indian states of Assam and Arunachal Pradesh. In 2025, the film received the National Film Award for Best Tai Phake Film at the 71st National Film Awards.

== Premise ==
The film follows a young woman named Ye Lon and her community as they face the possible decline of their language and cultural traditions. Set in a Tai Phake village, the story depicts aspects of everyday life, including local customs and religious practices such as food offerings at a Buddhist temple. The narrative focuses on the community’s efforts to preserve their language and traditional manuscripts by encouraging younger generations to learn and continue their cultural practices.

== Cast ==
- Homsen Pomung Weingken
- Nuk Chen Weingken
- Nongun Weingken

== Awards ==
Year	Award	Category	Result	Ref.
2025	71st National Film Awards	Best Tai Phake Film	Won	
