= Phake language =

Kra–Dai language spoken in Assam, India

Phake
- (တႝ)ၸႃကေ
- Native to: India
- Region: Assam
- Ethnicity: Tai Phake people
- Native speakers: 2,000 (2007)
- Language family: Kra–Dai: Tai; Southwestern; Northwestern; Phake
- Writing system: Burmese script (Phake variation, called Lik-Tai)

Language codes
- ISO 639-3: phk
- Glottolog: phak1238
- ELP: Phake

The Phake language or Tai Phake language (တႝၸႃကေ, tai phākae) is a Tai language spoken in the Buri Dihing Valley of Assam, India. It is closely related to the other Southwestern Tai languages in Assam: Aiton, Khamti, Khamyang, and Turung.

== Distribution ==
Buragohain (1998) lists the following Tai Phake villages.

- Man Phake Tau (Namphake village, Assam)
- Man Tipam (Tipam Phake village, Assam)
- Man Phake Neu (Bor Phake village, Assam)
- Man Mo (Man Mo village, Assam)
- Man Phaneng (Phaneng village, Assam)
- Man Long (Long village, Assam)
- Man Nonglai (Nonglaui village, Assam)
- Man Monglang (Monglang village, Assam)
- Man Nigam (Nigam village, Assam)
- Man Wagun (Wagun village, Arunachal Pradesh)
- Man Lung Kung (Lung Kung village, Arunachal Pradesh)

Tai Phake Villages (Morey 2005:22)
| Tai name | Translation of Tai name | Assamese/English name | District |
|---|---|---|---|
| ma꞉n3 pha꞉4 ke꞉5 taü3 | Lower Phake village | Namphakey | Dibrugarh |
| ma꞉n3 pha꞉k4 ta꞉5 | Other side of the river village | Tipam Phake | Dibrugarh |
| ma꞉n3 pha꞉4 ke꞉5 nɔ6 | Upper Phake village | Borphake | Tinsukia |
| niŋ1 kam4 | Ning kam Nagas | Nigam Phake | Tinsukia |
| ma꞉n3 pha꞉4 naiŋ2 | Red sky village | Faneng | Tinsukia |
| məŋ2 la꞉ŋ2 | Country of the Lang Nagas | Mounglang | Tinsukia |
| məŋ2 mɔ1 | Mine village | Man Mau | Tinsukia |
| ma꞉n3 loŋ6 | Big village | Man Long | Tinsukia |
| nauŋ1 lai6 | Nong Lai Nagas | Nonglai | - |

The [maːn˧] corresponds to the modern Thai ban (บ้าน) and Shan wan (ဝၢၼ်ႈ), which mean 'village'. (Note: For an explanation of the notation system for Tai tones, see Proto-Tai language#Tones.)

== Phonology ==
=== Consonants ===
==== Initial consonants ====
Tai Phake has the following initial consonants:

| | | Bilabial | Alveolar | Palatal | Velar | Glottal |
|---|---|---|---|---|---|---|
| Nasal | | m | n | | ŋ | |
| Plosive | tenuis | p | t | c | k | ʔ |
| Plosive | aspirated | pʰ | tʰ | | kʰ | |
| Fricative | | | s | | | h |
| Approximant | | w | l | j | | |

==== Final consonants ====
Tai Phake has the following final consonants:

| | Bilabial | Alveolar | Palatal | Velar | Glottal |
|---|---|---|---|---|---|
| Nasal | m | n | | ŋ | |
| Plosive | p | t | | k | ʔ |
| Approximant | w | | j | | |

-[w] occurs after front vowels and [a]-, -[j] occurs after back vowels and [a]-.

=== Vowels ===
Tai Phake has the following vowel inventory:

| | Front | Back | | |
| | unr. | unr. | | rnd. |
| | short | short | long | short |
|---|---|---|---|---|
| Close | i | ɯ | | u |
| Mid | e | ɤ | | o |
| Open | ɛ | a | aː | ɔ |

== Writing system ==
The Tai Phake have their own writing system called 'Lik-Tai', which they share with the Khamti people and Tai Aiton people. It closely resembles the Northern Shan script of Myanmar, which is a variant of the Burmese script, with some of the letters taking divergent shapes.

=== Consonants ===
| က k IPA: [k] | ၵ kh IPA: [kʰ] | င ng IPA: [ŋ] |
| ꩡ c IPA: [t͡ʃ], [t͡s] | ꩬ s IPA: [s] | ၺ ny IPA: [ɲ] |
| တ t IPA: [t] | ထ th IPA: [tʰ] | ꩫ n IPA: [n] |
| ပ p IPA: [p] | ၸ ph IPA: [pʰ] | မ m IPA: [m] |
| ယ y IPA: [j] | လ l IPA: [l] | ဝ w IPA: [w~v] |
| ꩭ h IPA: [h] | ဢ a IPA: [ʔ] | |

=== Vowels ===
| ႊ a IPA: [a] | ႃ ā IPA: [aː] | ိ i IPA: [i] | ီ ī IPA: [iː] | ု u IPA: [u] | ူ ū IPA: [uː] |
| ေ e/ae IPA: [eː/ɛ] | ႝ ai IPA: [ai] | ေႃ o/aw IPA: [oː/ɔː] | ံ ṁ IPA: [am] | ုံ um IPA: [um] | ွံ om IPA: [ɔm] |
| ိုဝ် eu IPA: [ɛu] | ်ႍ au IPA: [au] | ်ွ āu IPA: [aːu] | ွ aw IPA: [ɒ] | ွႝ oi IPA: [oj] | ် final consonant |
