= Tai Le script =

Abugida for the Tai Nüa language

Tai Le Dehong Dai
- Script type: Abugida
- Period: c. 1200 CE – present
- Direction: Left-to-right
- Languages: Tai Nüa, Ta'ang, Blang, Achang

Related scripts
- Parent systems: Proto-Sinaitic alphabet: Phoenician alphabet; Aramaic alphabet; Brāhmī; Pallava; Mon–Burmese; Lik-Tai scripts; Tai Le
- Sister systems: Ahom, Khamti

ISO 15924
- ISO 15924: Tale (353), Tai Le

Unicode
- Unicode alias: Tai Le
- Unicode range: U+1950–U+197F

The Tai Le script (ᥖᥭᥰ ᥘᥫᥴ, [tai˦.lə˧˥]), or Dehong Dai script, is a Brahmic script used to write the Tai Nüa language spoken by the Tai Nua people of south-central Yunnan, China. (The language is also known as Nɯa, Dehong Dai and Chinese Shan.) It is written in horizontal lines from left to right, with spaces only between clauses and sentences.

The Tai Le script is approximately 700–800 years old and has used several different orthographic conventions.

== Traditional script ==
The traditional Tai Le script is a Brahmic script that is found in the Dehong Dai and Jingpo Autonomous Prefecture of Yunnan, China.

The script is known by a variety of names. It is known as Lik Tho Ngok (Tai Nüa: lik4 tho2 ŋɔk4, "bean sprout script") by the Tai Nua, the Old Tay or Old Dai script, Lik Tay La/Na (Tai Nüa: lik6 Tay2 lä1/nä1, "Northern Tay script") and Lik To Yao (Tai Nüa: lik6 to4 yaaw2, "long script").

=== History ===
The Lik Tho Ngok script used by the Tai Nuea people is one of a number of "Lik Tai" scripts or "Lik" scripts used by various Tai peoples in northeastern India, northern Myanmar, southwestern Yunnan, and northwestern Laos. Evidence suggests that the Lik scripts have a common origin from an Old Burmese prototype before the fifteenth century, most probably in the polity of Mong Mao. The Lik Tai script featured on a 1407 Ming dynasty scroll exhibits many features of the Burmese script, including fourteen of the nineteen consonants, three medial diacritics and the high tone marker. According to the scholar Daniels, this shows that the Tai borrowed from the Burmese script to create their own script; the Lik Tai script was derived from the Burmese script, as it could only have been created by someone proficient in Burmese. Daniels also argues that, unlike previously thought, the Lik Tho Ngok script is not the origin of the other Lik Tai scripts, as the 1407 Lik Tai script shows greater similarity to the Ahom script, which has been attested earlier than the Lik Tho Ngok script. Other "Lik" scripts are used for the Khamti, Phake, Aiton and Ahom languages, as well as for other Tai languages across Northern Myanmar and Assam, in Northeast India. The Lik scripts have a limited inventory of 16 to 18 consonant symbols compared to the Tai Tham script, which possibly indicates that the scripts were not developed for writing Pali.

It is unknown when, where and how the Lik Tho Ngok script first emerged, and it has only been attested after the 18th century. Broadly speaking, only Lik Tho Ngok and Lik To Mon ('round' or 'circular' script), used in Shan State, are still in use today. Government-led reforms of the main Tai Nuea traditional scripts began in Dehong during the 1950s. Between 1952 and 1988 the Dehong script went through four reforms, initially adding a consonant, vowel symbols and tone markers, then in 1956 changing many graphemes and tone markers. A third reform was proposed in 1964, again adding and changing graphemes and making further changes to tone markers, and a fourth reform took place in 1988.

=== Characteristics ===
In common with other Lik orthographies, Lik Tho Ngok is an alphasyllabary, but not fully an abugida, since occurrence of an inherent vowel is restricted to medial position, where it may take either /-a-/ or /-aa-/.

In Mueng Sing today, the smaller glyphs are not used and two main styles of Lik Tho Ngok are recognised by local scribes: To Lem (Tai Nüa: to1 lem3 ‘edged letters,’) which have straighter edges and more pointed angles, and To Mon (Tai Nüa: to1 mon4 ‘rounded letters’) without sharp angles. There are 21 initial consonant graphemes in the Lik Tho Ngok script used in Mueang Sing, representing 15 phonemes in the spoken dialect plus two rarer phonemes (/d/ and /b/).

=== Variants and usage ===
The script used by the Tai Dehong and Tai Mao has consonant and vowel glyphs similar to the reformed Tai Le script, while the script used by the Tai Nuea differs somewhat from the other scripts. However, the scripts used by the Tai Nuea, Tai Dehong and Tai Mao are all considered Lik Tho Ngok.

In Muang Sing, Laos, the Lik Tho Ngok script is used for secular purposes, while the Tham script is used for Buddhist manuscripts. In Yunnan, China, Lik Tho Ngok is still used in the Jinggu Dai and Yi Autonomous County, the Menglian Dai, Lahu and Va Autonomous County, and the Gengma Dai and Va Autonomous County. Lik Tho Ngok and the reformed Tai Le script are used in the Dehong Dai and Jingpo Autonomous Prefecture, as well as Lik To Mon and the reformed Shan script (in areas near the Myanmar border). Tai Nuea areas that use the reformed Tai Le script have seen a decline in the knowledge and use of the traditional script, but recently there has been renewed interest in the traditional script and manuscript tradition.

The manuscript culture of the Tai Nuea people is maintained by small numbers of specialised scribes who are literate in the Lik Tho Ngok script, used for secular purposes and only in manuscripts. The script is not taught in temples, in favor of the Tai Tham script. The local government’s "Intangible Cultural Heritage Protection Center" is working to obtain and protect manuscripts written in the Dai traditional scripts, as of 2013.

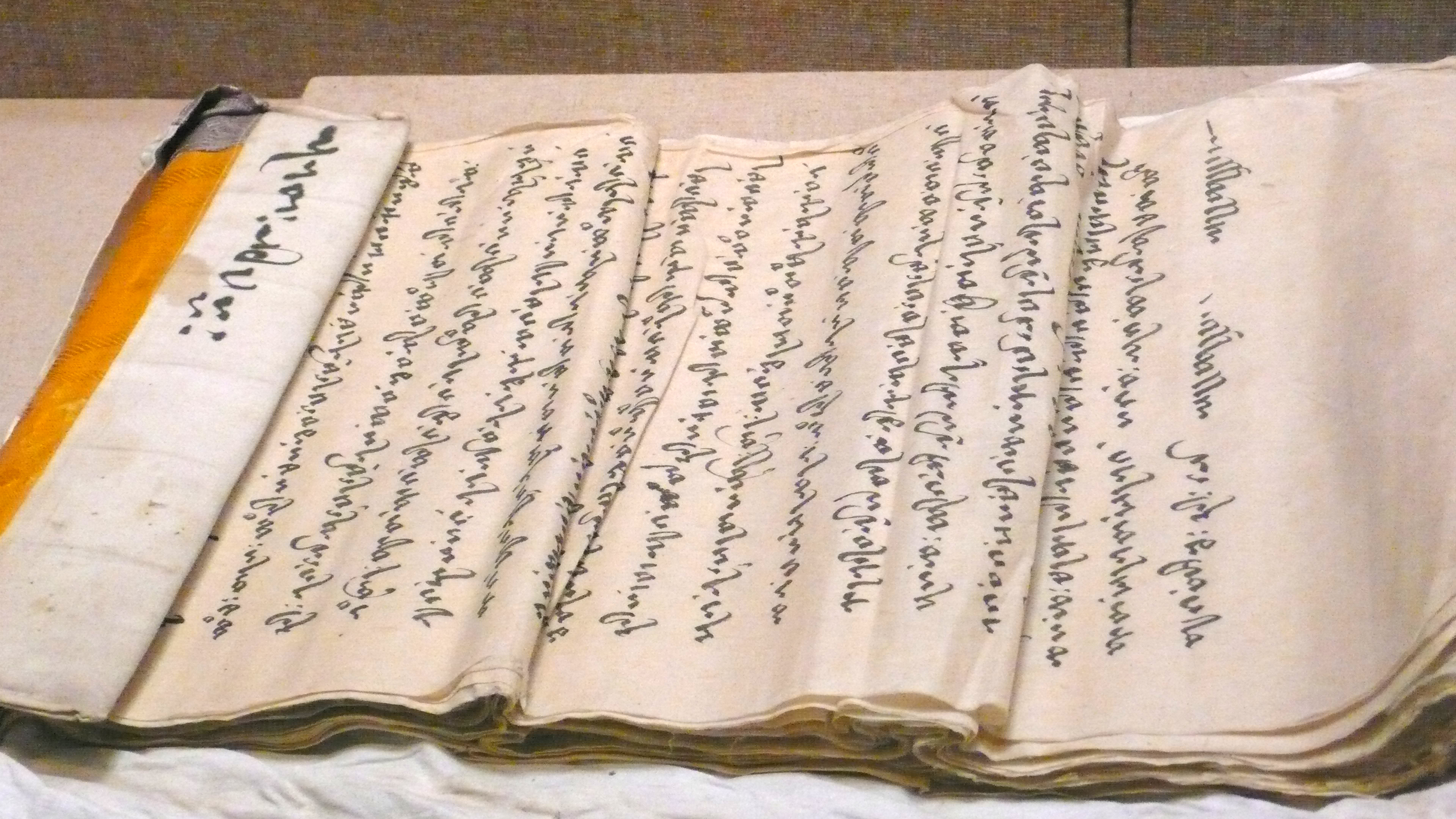
Buddhist texts written in Tai Le script.

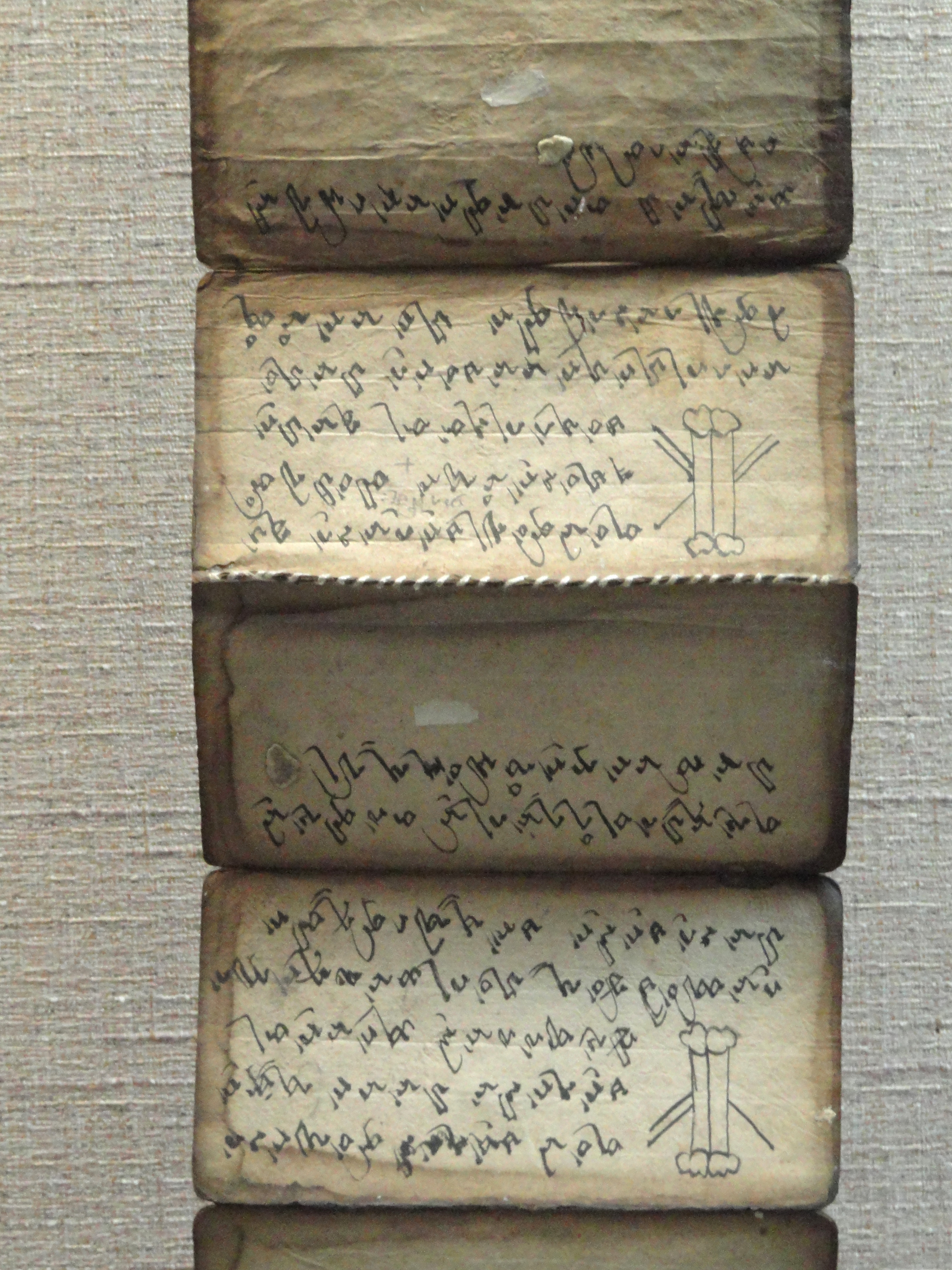
Dai scripture on mulberry-bark paper. Yunnan Nationalities Museum, Kunming, Yunnan, China

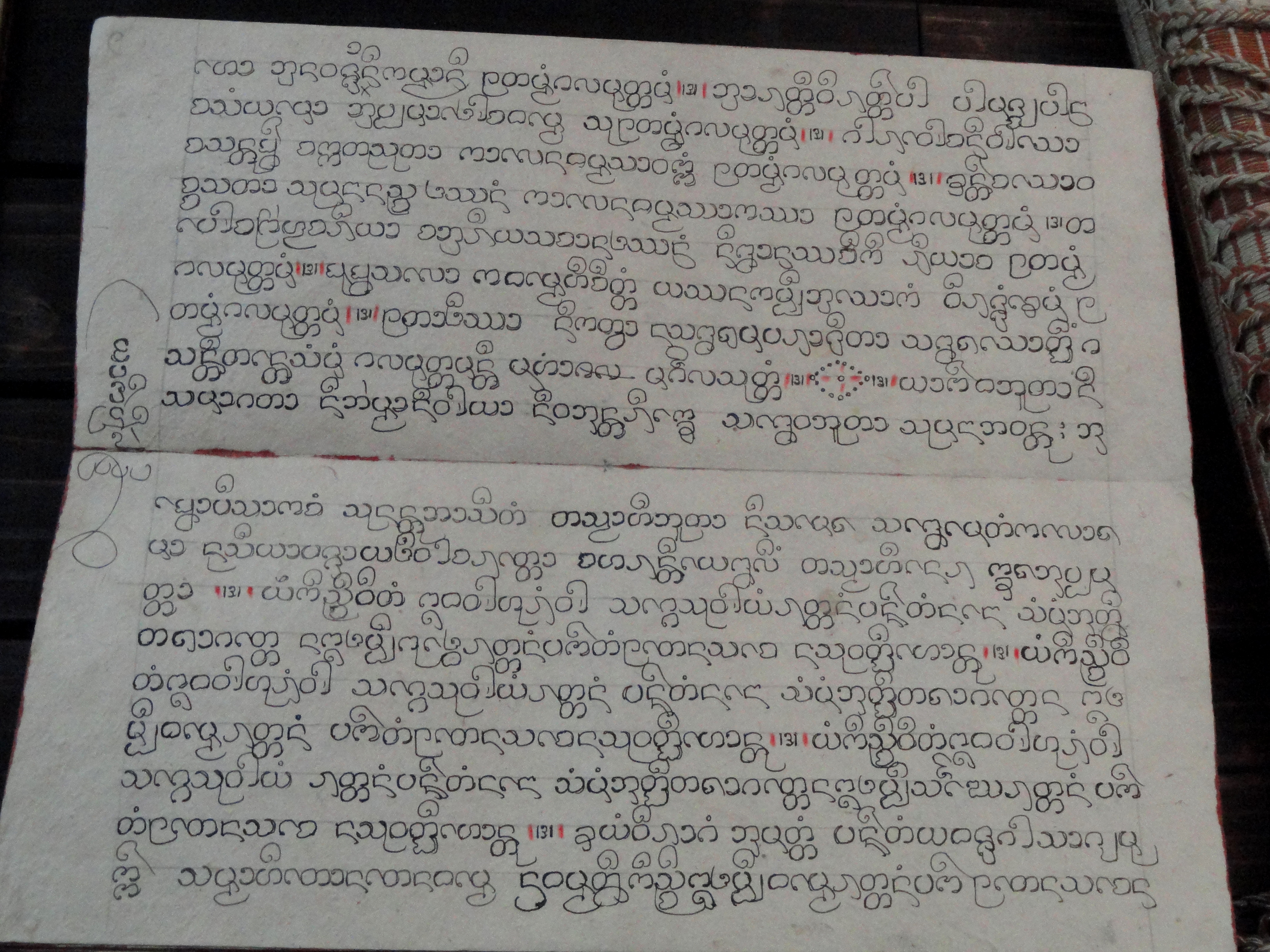
Dai scripture in Dai Le script

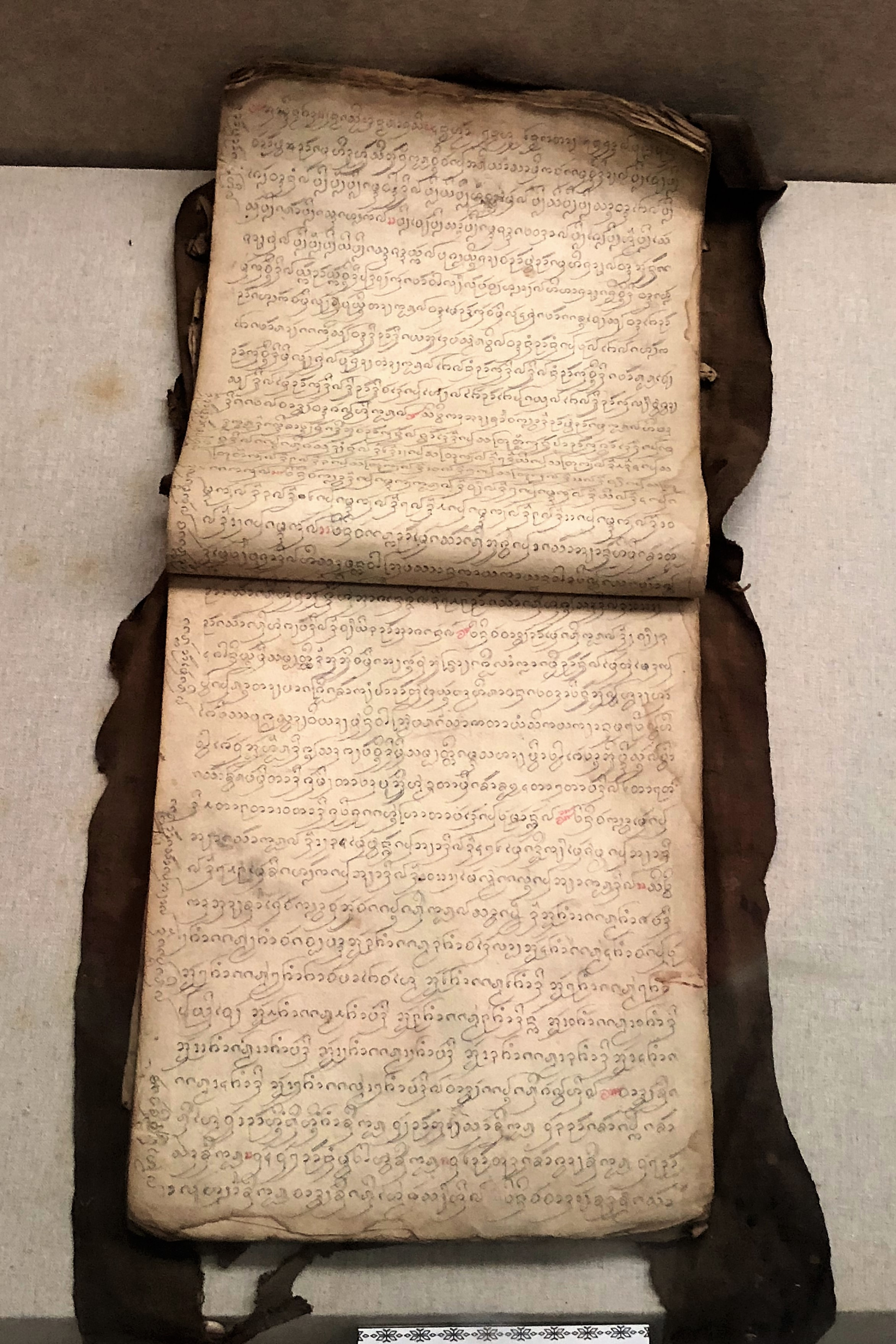
Dai people's medical book

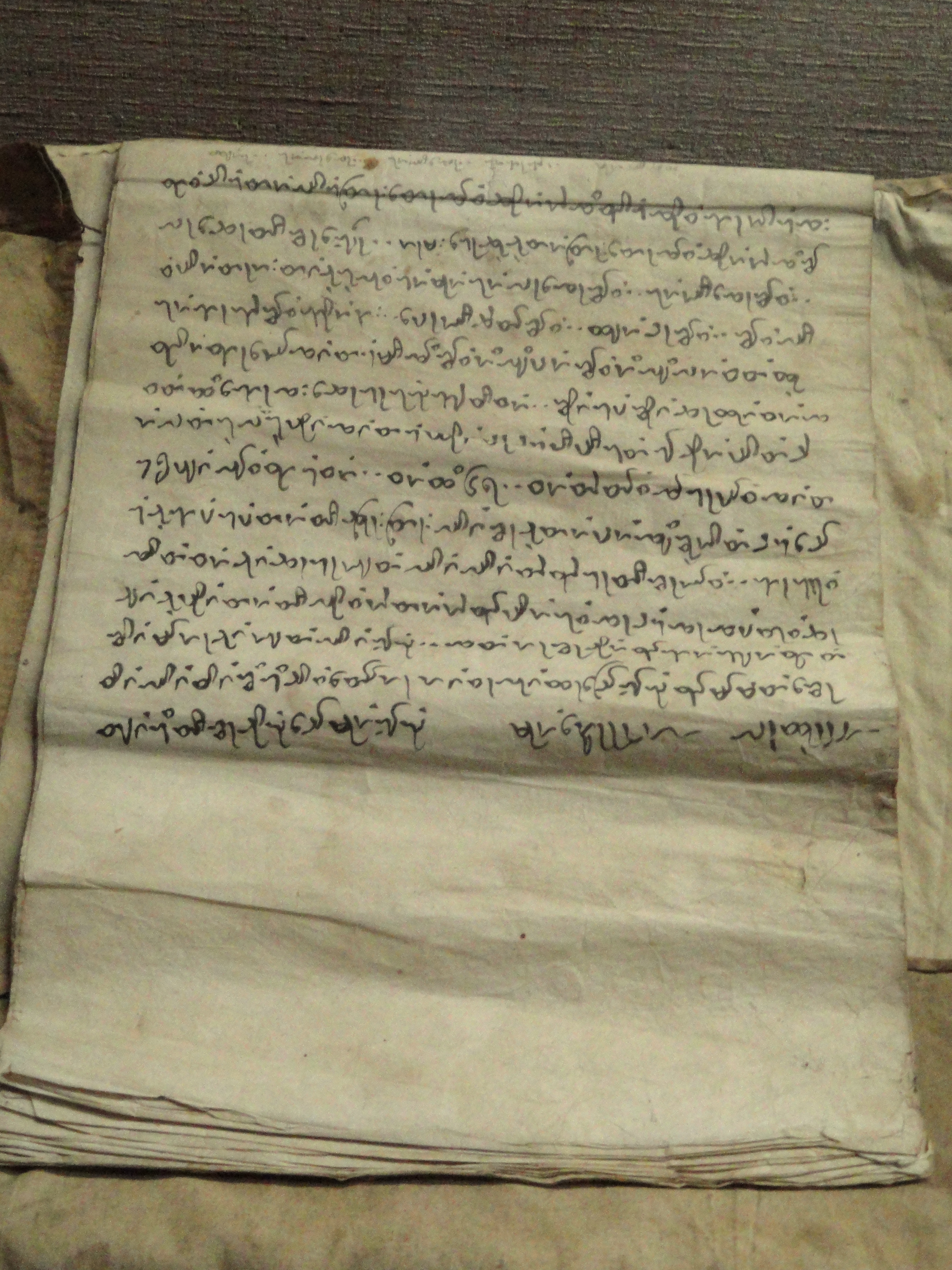
De'ang scripture, written in the Dai script

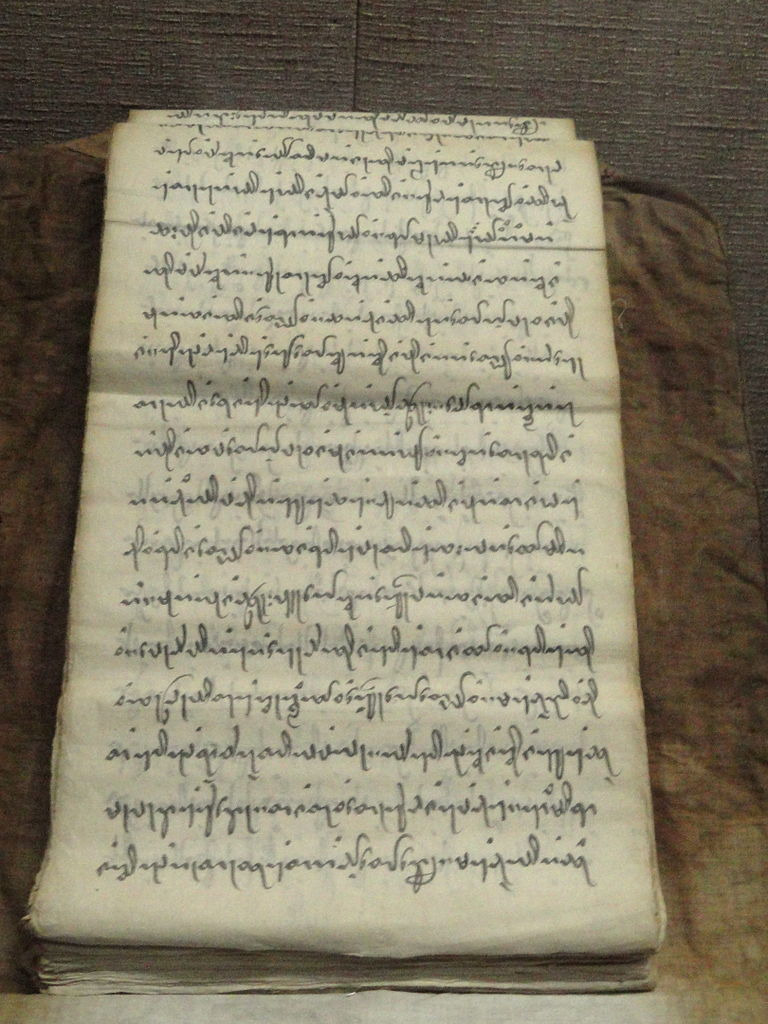
De'ang scripture, written in the Dai script

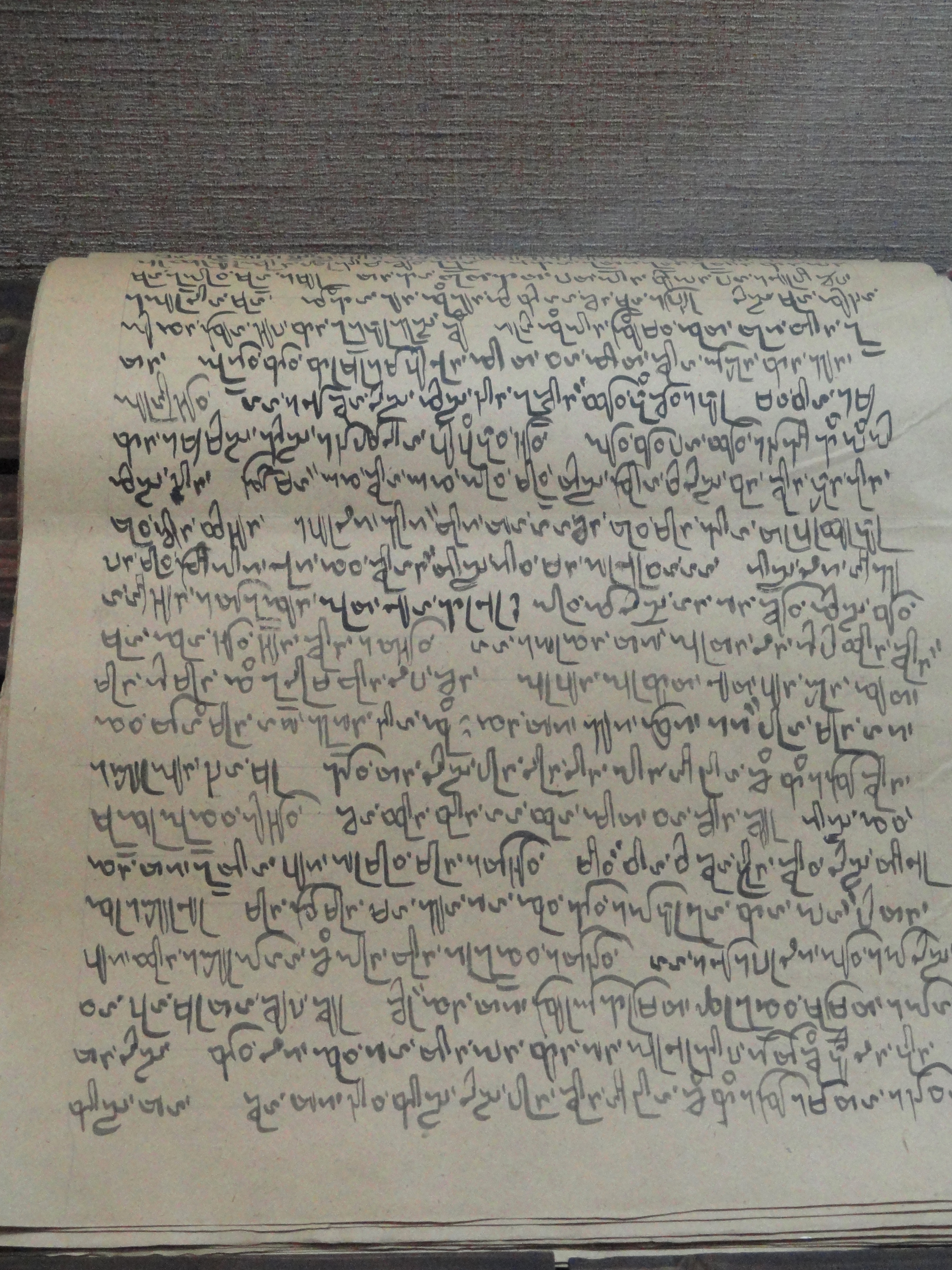
Dai Buddhist text

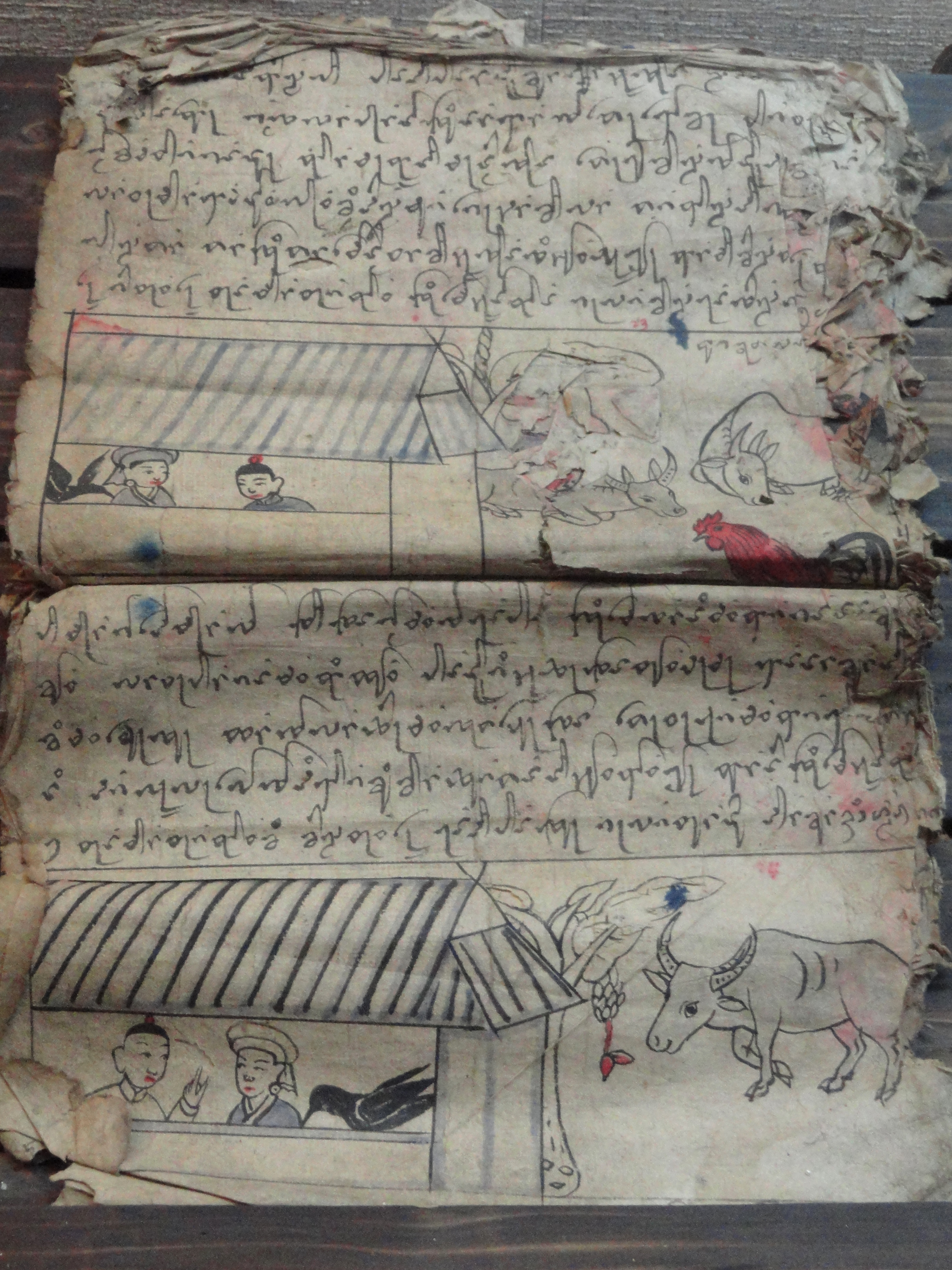
Dai fortune-telling manuscript

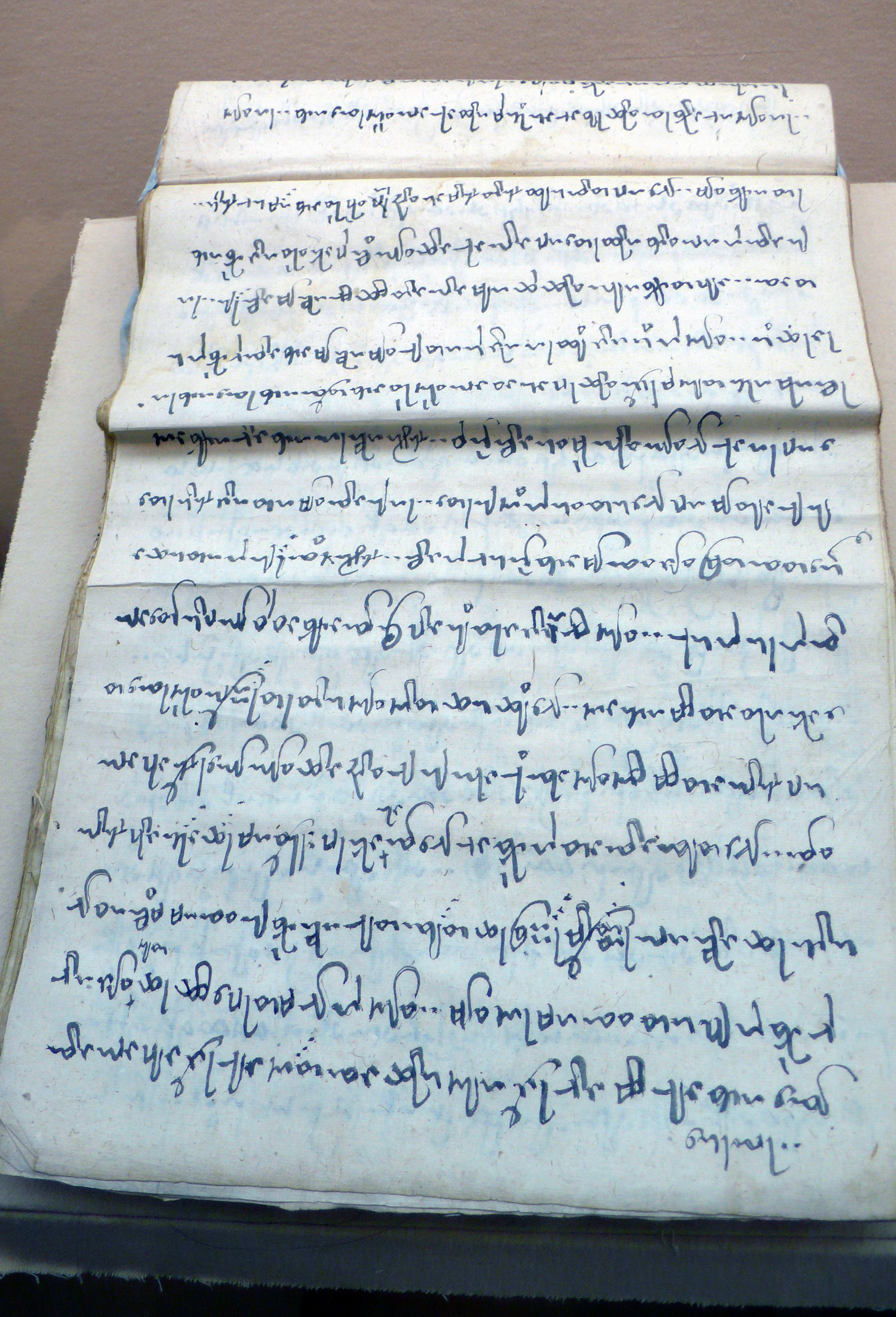
Buddhist scriptures in Dehong Dai script

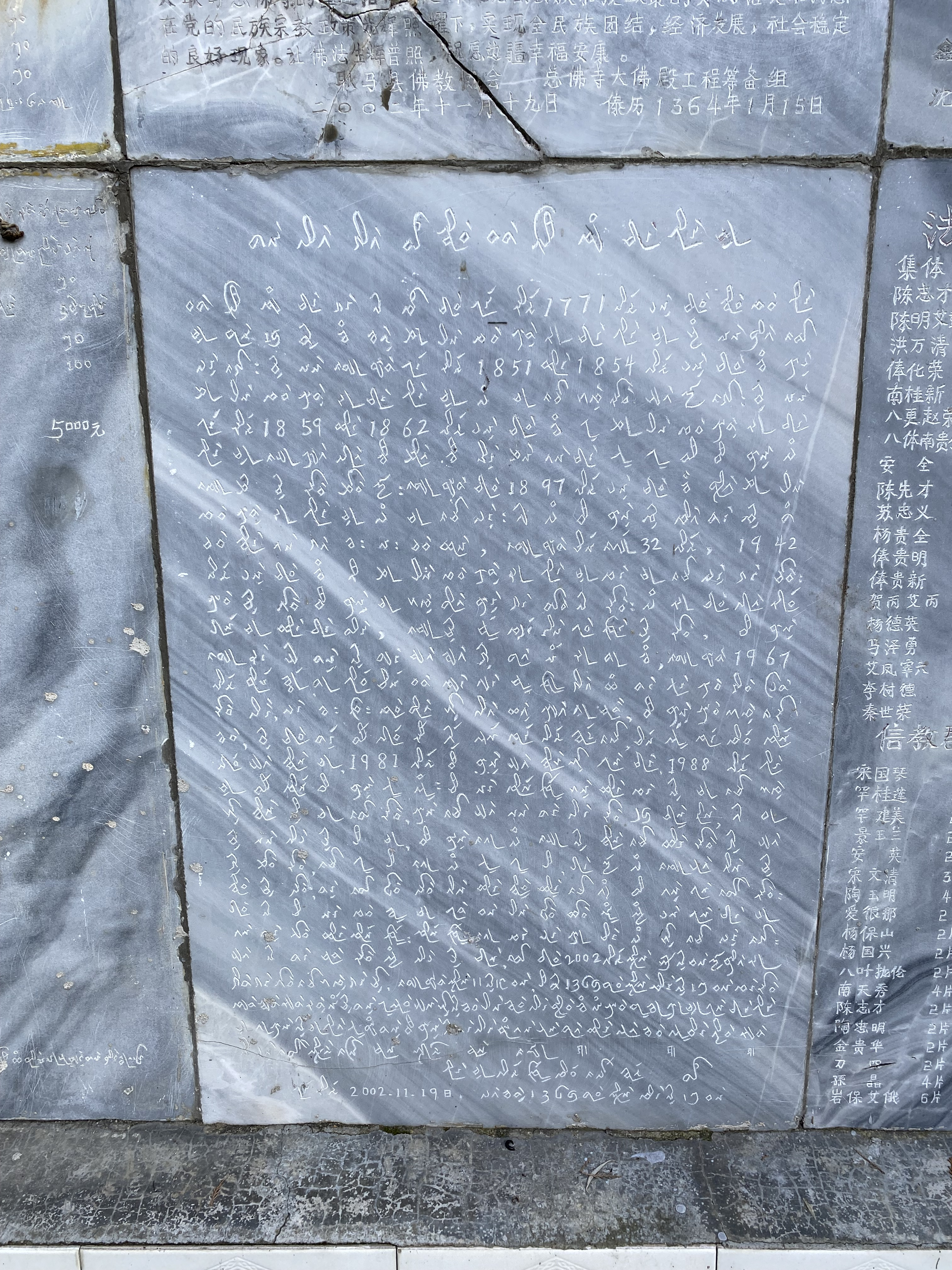
Gengma Buddhist Temple Great Buddha Hall Reconstruction Monument stone inscription in Dehong Dai script

== Reformed script ==
Between 1952 and 1988, the script went through four reforms. The third reform (1963/1964) used diacritics to represent tones, while the fourth reform (1988–present) uses standalone tone letters.

Today the reformed Tai Le script, which removes ambiguity in reading and adds tone markers, is widely used by the Tai Dehong and Tai Mao in the Dehong Dai and Jingpo Autonomous Prefecture, but not in Tai Nuea communities in the Jinggu Dai and Yi Autonomous County, the Menglian Dai, Lahu and Va Autonomous County, and the Gengma Dai and Va Autonomous County, where only the traditional scripts are used. Because of differing letters and orthographic rules, the traditional Tai Nuea and reformed Tai Le scripts are mutually unintelligible without considerable effort.

=== Letters ===
In modern Tai Le orthographies, initial consonants precede vowels, vowels precede final consonants and tone marks, if present, follow the entire syllable. Consonants have an inherent vowel /a/, unless followed by a dependent vowel sign. When vowels occur initially in a word or syllable, they are preceded by the vowel carrier ᥟ.

Tai Le writing system
Initials (IPA in brackets)
ᥐ IPA: [k]	ᥑ IPA: [x]	ᥒ IPA: [ŋ]	ᥓ IPA: [ts]	ᥔ IPA: [s]	ᥕ IPA: [j]	ᥖ IPA: [t]	ᥗ IPA: [tʰ]	ᥘ IPA: [l]		
ᥙ IPA: [p]	ᥚ IPA: [pʰ]	ᥛ IPA: [m]	ᥜ IPA: [f]	ᥝ IPA: [w]	ᥞ IPA: [h]	ᥟ IPA: [ʔ]	ᥠ IPA: [kʰ]	ᥡ IPA: [tsʰ]	ᥢ IPA: [n]	
Finals (IPA in brackets)
◌ IPA: [a]	ᥣ IPA: [aː]	ᥤ IPA: [i]	ᥥ IPA: [e]	ᥦ IPA: [ɛ], [ia]	ᥧ IPA: [u]	ᥨᥝ IPA: [o]	ᥩ IPA: [ɔ], [ua]	ᥪ IPA: [ɯ]	ᥫ IPA: [ə]	ᥬ IPA: [aɯ]
◌ᥭ IPA: [ai]	ᥣᥭ IPA: [aːi]				ᥧᥭ IPA: [ui]	ᥨᥭ IPA: [oi]	ᥩᥭ IPA: [ɔi]	ᥪᥭ IPA: [ɯi]	ᥫᥭ IPA: [əi]	
◌ᥝ IPA: [au]	ᥣᥝ IPA: [aːu]	ᥤᥝ IPA: [iu]	ᥥᥝ IPA: [eu]	ᥦᥝ IPA: [ɛu]				ᥪᥝ IPA: [ɯu]	ᥫᥝ IPA: [əu]	
◌ᥛ IPA: [am]	ᥣᥛ IPA: [aːm]	ᥤᥛ IPA: [im]	ᥥᥛ IPA: [em]	ᥦᥛ IPA: [ɛm]	ᥧᥛ IPA: [um]	ᥨᥛ IPA: [om]	ᥩᥛ IPA: [ɔm]	ᥪᥛ IPA: [ɯm]	ᥫᥛ IPA: [əm]	
◌ᥢ IPA: [an]	ᥣᥢ IPA: [aːn]	ᥤᥢ IPA: [in]	ᥥᥢ IPA: [en]	ᥦᥢ IPA: [ɛn]	ᥧᥢ IPA: [un]	ᥨᥢ IPA: [on]	ᥩᥢ IPA: [ɔn]	ᥪᥢ IPA: [ɯn]	ᥫᥢ IPA: [ən]	
ᥒ IPA: [aŋ]	ᥣᥒ IPA: [aːŋ]	ᥤᥒ IPA: [iŋ]	ᥥᥒ IPA: [eŋ]	ᥦᥒ IPA: [ɛŋ]	ᥧᥒ IPA: [uŋ]	ᥨᥒ IPA: [oŋ]	ᥩᥒ IPA: [ɔŋ]	ᥪᥒ IPA: [ɯŋ]	ᥫᥒ IPA: [əŋ]	
ᥙ IPA: [ap]	ᥣᥙ IPA: [aːp]	ᥤᥙ IPA: [ip]	ᥥᥙ IPA: [ep]	ᥦᥙ IPA: [ɛp]	ᥧᥙ IPA: [up]	ᥨᥙ IPA: [op]	ᥩᥙ IPA: [ɔp]	ᥪᥙ IPA: [ɯp]	ᥫᥙ IPA: [əp]	
ᥖ IPA: [at]	ᥣᥖ IPA: [aːt]	ᥤᥖ IPA: [it]	ᥥᥖ IPA: [et]	ᥦᥖ IPA: [ɛt]	ᥧᥖ IPA: [ut]	ᥨᥖ IPA: [ot]	ᥩᥖ IPA: [ɔt]	ᥪᥖ IPA: [ɯt]	ᥫᥖ IPA: [ət]	
ᥐ IPA: [ak]	ᥣᥐ IPA: [aːk]	ᥤᥐ IPA: [ik]	ᥥᥐ IPA: [ek]	ᥦᥐ IPA: [ɛk]	ᥧᥐ IPA: [uk]	ᥨᥐ IPA: [ok]	ᥩᥐ IPA: [ɔk]	ᥪᥐ IPA: [ɯk]	ᥫᥐ IPA: [ək]	

Tone letters (current usage)
∅ mid-level	ᥰ high-level	ᥱ low-level	ᥲ mid-fall	ᥳ high-fall	ᥴ mid-rise
Tone diacritics (1963 orthography)
∅ mid-level	◌̈ high-level	◌̌ low-level	◌̀ mid-fall	◌̇ high-fall	◌́ mid-rise

Note that old orthography tone diacritics combine with short letters (as in /ka²/ ᥐ̈) but appear to the right of tall letters (as in /ki²/ ᥐᥤ̈).

== Numerals ==
There are differences between the numerals employed by the Tai Le script in China and Myanmar. The Chinese Tai Le numerals are similar to Chinese Shan and Burmese numerals. Burmese Tai Le numerals are similar to Burmese Shan numerals.

Arabic	0	1	2	3	4	5	6	7	8	9
Tham Hora	᪀	᪁	᪂	᪃	᪄	᪅	᪆	᪇	᪈	᪉
Chinese Shan	᧐	᧑	ᥨ	၃	၄	၅	᧖	၇	᧘	᧙
Chinese Tai Le	᧐	᧑	ᥨ	၃	၄	၅	᧖	၇	᧘	᧙
Burmese	၀	၁	၂	၃	၄	၅	၆	၇	၈	၉
Burmese Shan	႐	႑	႒	႓	႔	႕	႖	႗	႘	႙
Burmese Tai Le	႐	႑			႔	႕	႖	႗	႘	႙

== Unicode ==
The Tai Le script was added to the Unicode Standard in April 2003 with the release of version 4.0.

The Unicode block for Tai Le is U+1950–U+197F:

Tai Le^{[1]}^{[2]} Official Unicode Consortium code chart (PDF)
	0	1	2	3	4	5	6	7	8	9	A	B	C	D	E	F
U+195x	ᥐ	ᥑ	ᥒ	ᥓ	ᥔ	ᥕ	ᥖ	ᥗ	ᥘ	ᥙ	ᥚ	ᥛ	ᥜ	ᥝ	ᥞ	ᥟ
U+196x	ᥠ	ᥡ	ᥢ	ᥣ	ᥤ	ᥥ	ᥦ	ᥧ	ᥨ	ᥩ	ᥪ	ᥫ	ᥬ	ᥭ		
U+197x	ᥰ	ᥱ	ᥲ	ᥳ	ᥴ											
Notes 1.As of Unicode version 17.0 2.Grey areas indicate non-assigned code points

The tone diacritics used in the old orthography (specifically the third reform) are located in the Combining Diacritical Marks Unicode block:

- U+0300 ◌̀ COMBINING GRAVE ACCENT
- U+0301 ◌́ COMBINING ACUTE ACCENT
- U+0307 ◌̇ COMBINING DOT ABOVE
- U+0308 ◌̈ COMBINING DIAERESIS
- U+030C ◌̌ COMBINING CARON

== See also ==
- The New Tai Lue alphabet for the Tai Lü language, derived from the Old Tai Lue script "Dai Tam"; which is an abugida

== Sources ==
- Wharton, David (2017). Language, Orthography and Buddhist Manuscript Culture of the Tai Nuea: An Apocryphal Jātaka Text in Mueang Sing, Laos (PhD thesis). Universität Passau. urn:nbn:de:bvb:739-opus4-5236.
- Daniels, Christian (2012). "Script without Buddhism: Burmese Influence on the Tay (Shan) Script of Mäng^{2} Maaw^{2} as Seen in a Chinese Scroll Painting of 1407". International Journal of Asian Studies. 9 (2): 147–176. doi:10.1017/S1479591412000010. S2CID 143348310.
