= Shan language =

Kra–Dai language of Myanmar

Shan
- Tai Yai
- ၵႂၢမ်းတႆး (kwā́m táy), လိၵ်ႈတႆး (lik táy)
- Pronunciation: [kwáːm táj] [lik táj]
- Native to: Myanmar
- Region: Shan State
- Ethnicity: Shan, Dai, Kula
- Native speakers: 4.7 million (2017)
- Language family: Kra–Dai: Tai; Southwestern; Northwestern (Shan); Shan
- Dialects: Standard (Eastern); Khün; Tai Nuea; Khamti; Tai Laing; Aiton; Phake; Khamyang; Turung
- Writing system: Mon–Burmese (Shan alphabet)

Official status
- Recognised minority language in: Myanmar

Language codes
- ISO 639-2: shn
- ISO 639-3: shn
- Glottolog: shan1277
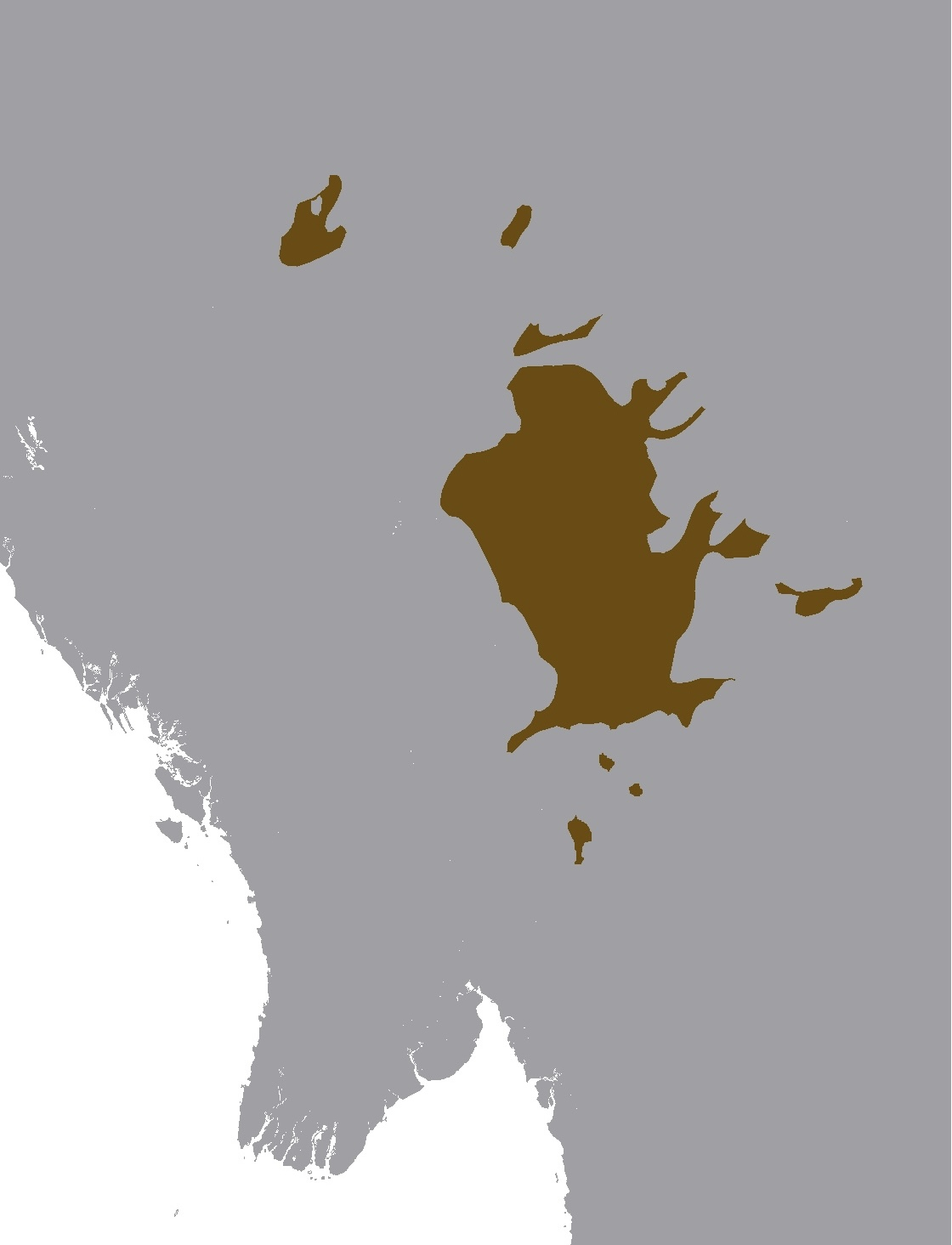

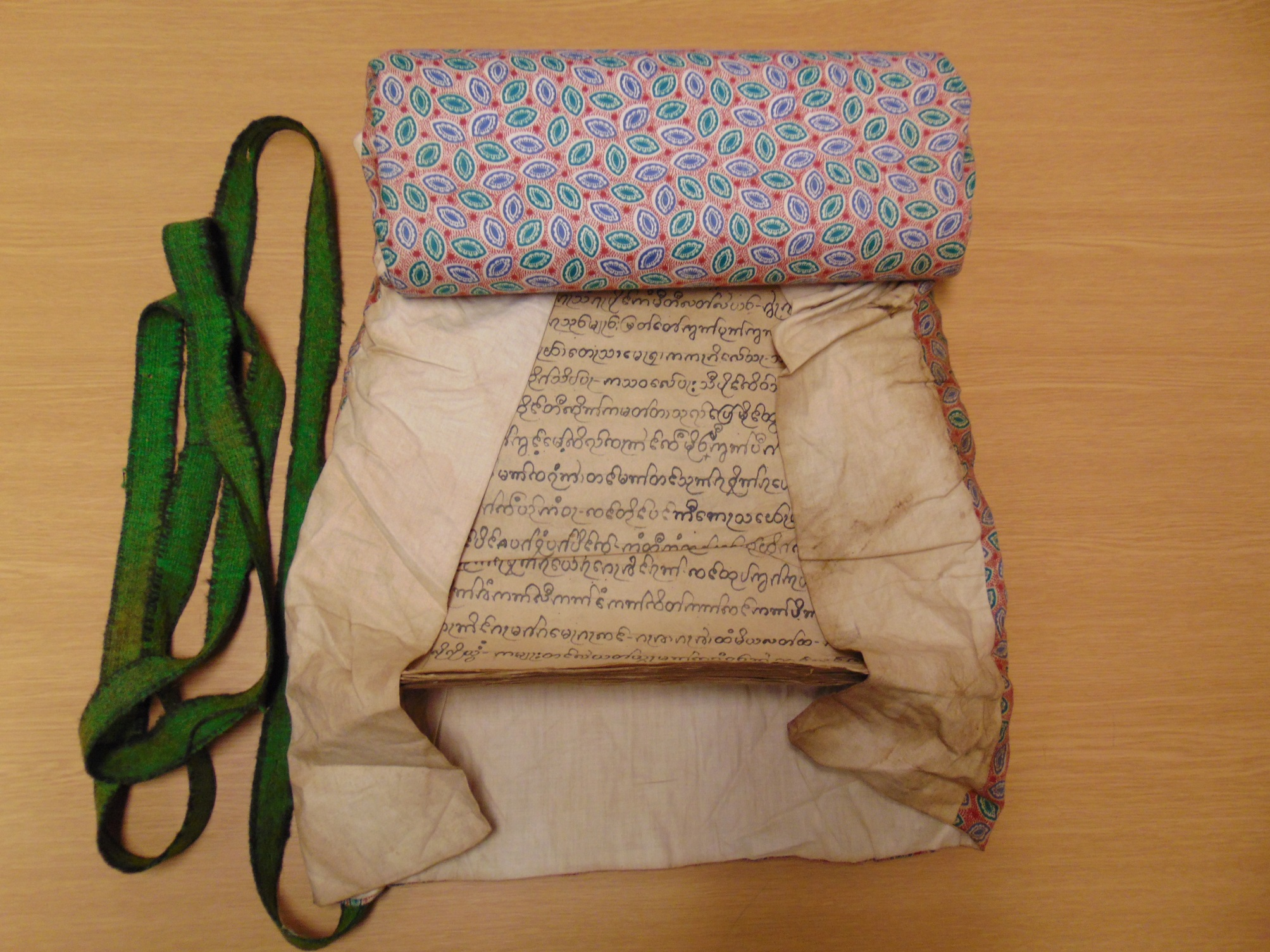
Shan paper manuscript bound with a patterned cotton cloth cover and a felt binding ribbon, Shan State, first half of the 20th century. British Library

Shan is the native language of the Shan people and is mostly spoken in Shan State, Myanmar. It is also spoken in pockets in other parts of Myanmar, Northern Thailand, Yunnan, Laos, Cambodia, Vietnam and decreasingly in Assam and Meghalaya. Shan is a member of the Kra–Dai language family and is related to Thai. It has five tones, which do not correspond exactly to Thai tones, plus a sixth tone used for emphasis. The term Shan is also used for related Northwestern Tai languages, and it is called Tai Yai or Tai Long in other Tai languages.

In 2019, Ethnologue estimated there were 3.3 million Shan speakers, including 3.2 million in Myanmar. The Mahidol University Institute for Language and Culture estimates there are gave the number of Shan speakers in Thailand as 95,000 in 2006. Many Shan speak local dialects as well as the language of their trading partners.

== History ==
Historically, the dominance of Shan as a regional lingua franca made it the source of many loanwords in other regional languages, especially Jingpo and Palaung.

=== Influence from Burmese ===
By the same token, Shan has been significantly influenced by Burmese, mediated by centuries of historical and ongoing contact and exchange between Burmese and Shan speakers, especially between the Burmese royal court and Shan principalities. For instance, the lack of a /f/ sound in most Shan dialects is attributed to Burmese influence; this sound is present in the closely related Khün and Northern Thai languages. Shan vocabulary has been significantly enriched by Burmese contact, with Burmese loan words appearing throughout the Shan lexicon, including loanwords borrowed from Pali via Burmese. Burmese appears to have also influenced Shan grammar, with respect to the use of complex prepositions and certain word patterns that do not exist in closely related Tai languages.

Due to Shan's status as a lingua franca in the region, it has served as an intermediary, passing loanwords from Burmese into other regional languages.

=== Influence from Thai ===
Due to labour migration in recent decades, one million ethnic Shan now live in Thailand. As a result of ongoing language contact, Thai has increasingly become a competing source of loanwords into Shan, especially for scientific and political concepts. These Thai loanwords are often more difficult to detect, because of phonetic and structural similarities between Shan and Thai. Some recent phonological developments, like the reversal of the historical /f/ > /pʰ/ shift especially among younger Shan speakers, is attributed to contact with Thai.

== Names ==
The Shan language has a number of names in different Tai languages and Burmese.

- In Shan, the spoken language is commonly called kwam tai (ၵႂၢမ်းတႆး, [kwáːm.táj], lit. 'Tai language'). The written language is called lik tai (လိၵ်ႈတႆး, [lik táj]).
- In Burmese, it is called hram: bhasa (ရှမ်းဘာသာ, [ʃáɰ̃ bàðà]), whence the English word "Shan". The term "Shan," which was formerly spelt hsyam: (သျှမ်း) in Burmese, is an exonym believed to be a Burmese derivative of "Siam" (an old term for Thailand).
- In Thai and Southern Thai, it is called phasa thai yai (ภาษาไทใหญ่, [pʰāː.sǎː.tʰāj.jàj], lit. 'big/great Tai language') or more informally or even vulgarly by some phasa ngiao (ภาษาเงี้ยว, [pʰāː.sǎː.ŋía̯w], an outdated term that now sounds like the word for "snake").
- In Northern Thai, it is called kam tai (กำไต, [kām.tāj], literally "Tai language") or more informally or even vulgarly by some kam ngiao (กำเงี้ยว, [kām.ŋía̯w]), lit. 'Shan language').
- In Lao, it is called phasa tai yai (ພາສາໄທໃຫຍ່, [pʰáː.sǎː.tʰáj.ɲāj], lit. 'big/great Tai language') or more informally or even vulgarly by some phasa ngiao (ພາສາງ້ຽວ, [pʰáː.sǎː.ŋîa̯w]).
- In Tai Lü, it is called kam ngio (ᦅᧄᦇᦲᧁᧉ, [kâm.ŋìw]).

== Dialects ==
The Shan dialects spoken in Shan State can be divided into three groups, roughly coinciding with geographical and modern administrative boundaries, namely the northern, southern, and eastern dialects. Dialects differ to a certain extent in vocabulary and pronunciation, but are generally mutually intelligible.

While the southern dialect has borrowed more Burmese words, eastern Shan is somewhat closer to Northern Thai language and Lao in vocabulary and pronunciation, and the northern so-called "Chinese Shan" is much influenced by the Yunnan-Chinese dialect.

A number of words differ in initial consonants. In the north, initial /k/, /kʰ/ and /m/, when combined with certain vowels and final consonants, are pronounced /tʃ/ (written ky), /tʃʰ/ (written khy) and /mj/ (written my). In Chinese Shan, initial /n/ becomes /l/. In southwestern regions /m/ is often pronounced as /w/. Initial /f/ only appears in the east, while in the other two dialects it merges with /pʰ/.

J. Marvin Brown divides the three dialects of Shan State as follows:

1. Northern — Lashio, Burma; contains more Chinese influences
2. Southern — Taunggyi, Burma (capital of Shan State); contains more Burmese influences
3. Eastern — Kengtung, Burma (in the Golden Triangle); closer to Northern Thai and Lao

Prominent divergent dialects are considered separate languages, such as Khün (called Kon Shan by the Burmese), which is spoken in Kengtung valley. Chinese Shan is also called Tai Mao, referring to the old Shan State of Mong Mao. Tai Long is used to refer to the Southern Shan State dialect spoken in southern and central regions west of the Salween River, the Northern Shan State dialect, and the dialect spoken in Laos. There are also dialects still spoken by a small number of people in Kachin State, such as Tai Laing, and Khamti spoken in northern Sagaing Region.

== Phonology ==
=== Consonants ===
Shan has 19 consonants. Unlike Thai and Lao (Isan) there are no voiced plosives /d/ and /b/.

		Labial	Dental/ Alveolar	(Alveolo-) Palatal	Velar	Glottal
Nasal		/m/ မ	/n/ ၼ	/ɲ/ ၺ	/ŋ/ င	
Plosive	unaspirated	/p/ ပ	/t/ တ	/tɕ/ ၸ	/k/ ၵ	/ʔ/ (Note: The glottal plosive is implied after a short vowel without final, or the silent 'a' before a vowel.) ဢ
Plosive	aspirated	/pʰ/ ၽ	/tʰ/ ထ		/kʰ/ ၶ	
Fricative		(/f/) (Note: Initial [f] is only found in eastern dialects in words that are pronounced with [pʰ] elsewhere.) ၾ	/s/ သ			/h/ ႁ
Trill			(/r/) (Note: The trill is very rare and mainly used in Pali and some English loan words, sometimes as a glide in initial consonant clusters. Many Shans find it difficult to pronounce [r], often pronouncing it [l].) ရ			
Approximant				/j/ ယ	/w/ ဝ	
Lateral			/l/ လ			

=== Vowels and diphthongs ===
Shan has ten vowels and 13 diphthongs:

	Front	Central	Back
Close	/i/	/ɨ/~/ɯ/	/u/
Mid	/e/	/ə/~/ɤ/	/o/
Open	/ɛ/	/a/ /aː/	/ɔ/

[iw], [ew], [ɛw]; [uj], [oj], [ɯj], [ɔj], [ɤj]; [aj], [aɯ], [aw]; [aːj], [aːw]

Shan has less vowel complexity than Thai, and Shan people learning Thai have difficulties with sounds such as "ia," "ua," and "uea" [ɯa]. Triphthongs are absent. Shan has no systematic distinction between long and short vowels characteristic of Thai.

=== Tones ===
Shan has phonemic contrasts among the tones of syllables. There are five to six tonemes in Shan, depending on the dialect. The sixth tone is only spoken in the north; in other parts it is only used for emphasis.

==== Contrastive tones in unchecked syllables ====
The table below presents six phonemic tones in unchecked syllables, i.e. closed syllables ending in sonorant sounds such as [m], [n], [ŋ], [w], and [j] and open syllables.

No.	Description	IPA	Description	Transcription (Note: The symbol in the first transcription column corresponds to conventions used for other tonal languages; the second is derived from the Shan orthography.)	
1	rising (24)	˨˦	Starting rather low and rising pitch	ǎ	a (not marked)
2	low (11)	˩	Low, even pitch	à	a,
3	mid-falling (32)	˧˨	Medium level pitch, slightly falling in the end	a (not marked)	a;
4	high (55)	˥	High, even pitch	á	a:
5	high-falling and creaky (42)	˦˨ˀ	Short, creaky, strongly falling with lax final glottal stop	âʔ, â̰	a.
6	emphatic (343) or middle (33)	˧˦˧ / ˧	Starting mid level, then slightly rising, with a drop at the end (similar to tones 3 and 5)	a᷈	a-

The following table shows an example of the phonemic tones:

Tone	Shan	IPA	Transliteration	English
rising	ၼႃ	/nǎː/	na	thick
low	ၼႃႇ	/nàː/	na,	very
mid-falling	ၼႃႈ	/nà̱ː/	na;	face
high	ၼႃး	/náː/	na:	paddy field
high-falling and creaky	ၼႃႉ	/nâ̰(ː)/	na.	aunt, uncle
emphatic or middle	ၼႃႊ	/nāː/	na-	(for interjection / transcription)

The Shan tones correspond to Thai tones as follows:

1. The Shan rising tone is close to the Thai rising tone.
2. The Shan low tone is equivalent to the Thai low tone.
3. The Shan mid-tone is different from the Thai mid-tone. It falls in the end.
4. The Shan high tone is close to the Thai high tone. But it is not rising.
5. The Shan falling tone is different from the Thai falling tone. It is short, creaky and ends with a glottal stop.

==== Contrastive tones in checked syllables ====
The table below presents four phonemic tones in checked syllables, i.e. closed syllables ending in a glottal stop [ʔ] and obstruent sounds such as [p], [t], and [k].

Tone	Shan	Phonemic	Phonetic	Transliteration	English
high	လၵ်း	/lák/	[lak˥]	lak:	post
creaky	လၵ်ႉ	/la̰k/	[la̰k˦˨ˀ]	lak.	steal
low	လၢၵ်ႇ	/làːk/	[laːk˩]	laak,	differ from others
mid	လၢၵ်ႈ	/lāːk/	[laːk˧˨]	laak;	drag

=== Syllable structure ===
The syllable structure of Shan is C(G)V((V)/(C)), which is to say the onset consists of a consonant optionally followed by a glide, and the rhyme consists of a monophthong alone, a monophthong with a consonant, or a diphthong alone. (Only in some dialects, a diphthong may also be followed by a consonant)

The glides are: -w-, -y- and -r-. There are seven possible final consonants: /ŋ/, /n/, /m/, /k/, /t/, /p/, and /ʔ/.

Some representative words are:

- CV /kɔ/ also
- CVC /kàːt/ market
- CGV /kwàː/ to go
- CGVC /kwaːŋ/ broad
- CVV /kǎi/ far
- CGVV /kwáːi/ water buffalo

Typical Shan words are monosyllabic. Multisyllabic words are mostly Pali loanwords, or Burmese words with the initial weak syllable /ə/.

== Pronouns ==
Person	Pronoun	IPA	Meaning
first	ၵဝ်	[kǎw]	I/me (informal)
first	တူ	[tǔ]	I/me (informal)
first	ၶႃႈ	[kʰaː]	I/me (formal) "servant, slave"
first	ႁႃး	[háː]	we/us two (familiar/dual)
first	ႁဝ်း	[háw]	we/us (general)
first	ႁဝ်းၶႃႈ	[háw.kʰaː]	we/us (formal) "we servants, we slaves"
second	မႂ်း	[máɰ]	you (informal/familiar)
second	ၸဝ်ႈ	[tɕaw]	you (formal) "master, lord"
second	ၶိူဝ်	[kʰɤ̂]	you two (familiar/dual)
second	သူ	[sǔ]	you (formal/singular, general/plural)
second	သူၸဝ်ႈ	[sǔ.tɕaw]	you (formal/singular, general/plural) "you masters, you lords"
third	မၼ်း	[mán]	he/she/it (informal/familiar)
third	ၶႃ	[kʰǎː]	they/them two (familiar/dual)
third	ၶဝ်	[kʰǎw]	he/she/it (formal), or they/them (general)
third	ၶဝ်ၸဝ်ႈ	[kʰǎw.tɕaw]	he/she/it (formal), or they/them (formal) "they masters, they lords"
third	ပိူၼ်ႈ	[pɤn]	they/them, others

== Resources ==
Given the present instabilities in Burma, one choice for scholars is to study the Shan people and their language in Thailand, where estimates of Shan refugees run as high as two million, and Mae Hong Son Province is home to a Shan majority. The major source for information about the Shan language in English is Dunwoody Press's Shan for English Speakers. They also publish a Shan-English dictionary. Aside from this, the language is almost completely undescribed in English.
