= Khamyang language =

Endangered Tai language spoken in India

Khamyang
- Native to: India
- Region: Assam
- Ethnicity: 800 Khamyang people
- Native speakers: 50 (2003)
- Language family: Kra–Dai: Tai; Southwestern; Northwestern; Khamyang
- Writing system: Burmese script

Language codes
- ISO 639-3: ksu
- Glottolog: kham1291
- ELP: Khamyang

Khamyang is a critically endangered Tai language of India, spoken by the Khamyang people. Approximately fifty people speak the language; all reside in the village of Powaimukh, located seven miles downstream of Margherita in the Tinsukia district. It is closely related to the other Tai languages in the Assam region: Aiton, Khamti, Phake, and Turung.

== General information ==
The Khamyang (also spelled Kamjang, Khamjang) language is in a critically endangered state. It is only spoken as a mother tongue in Powaimukh, and only by no more than fifty older adults. It is used by older adults to communicate with one another, in specific religious and ritual times, and when in contact with other Tai speakers. Only two Khamyang speakers can read the language: Chaw Sa Myat Chowlik and Chaw Cha Seng. Both are elderly and were born in 1920 and 1928, respectively. Additionally, the resident monk, Etika Bhikku, who natively speaks Tai Phake, is fluent in the Tai script. In addition to the older generation of full speakers, there is a middle generation of semi-speakers of Khamyang. Morey writes that their knowledge has not yet been fully investigated. Also, children in Pawaimukh have some knowledge of the language.

The phonetic transcription of Khamyang's name for the village is maan3 paa1 waai6, and it is the Assamese/English name Pawoimukh. According to Chaw Sa Myat, waai6 means rattan, and was given because rattan plants grow on the river. There are several variants of the spelling: Pawaimukh, Powaimukh, and others; the 2011 census of India lists the village as Powai Mukh No. 2, as does Google Earth. The translation of the village's Khamyang name is "Village of the Pawai River."

The Khamyangs are also sometimes referred to as the Nora, although Morey notes that he has never heard the remaining Khamyang speakers refer to themselves as Nora.

== History ==
Very little has been written about the origin, language, and history of the Khamyang people. In 1981, Muhi Chandra Shyam Panjok discussed the history of the Khamyangs. Panjok's account begins with a group of Tai, who in the future would be called Khamyangs, being sent into Assam by Tai King Sukhanpha. Their goal was to search for the king's brother, Sukapha, the founder of the Ahom Kingdom in the Brahmaputra valley in 1228. After finding Sukapha and returning to King Sukhanpha, the Khamyangs settled at the Nawng Yang lake and lived there for approximately 500 years. Leach believes the lake to the south of the Tirap River, and cites the lake as the origin of the name "Khamyang". In 1780, the Khamyangs resettled in the Assam region and became divided in the troubles of the final years of the Ahom Kingdom, fighting "with and against" the Ahoms.

One group of Khamyangs settled in Dhali in 1798, and are thought to be the ancestors of the ethnic Khamyangs who currently live in the Jorhat and Golaghat districts. Boruah lists several Khamyang villages in the Jorhat and Golaghat districts: Na-Shyam Gaon, Balijan Shyam Gaon, Betbaru Shyam Gaon in Jorhat; Rajapukhuri No. 1 Shyam Gaon in Golaghat. Tai Khamyang is not spoken in these communities, and self-identification as a Khamyang is not necessarily based on the usage of the language.

Another of the divided groups settled in the Dibrugarh district, then in 1922, resettled in the village of Pawaimukh. The latter part of Panjok's account was confirmed by Chaw Sa Myat Chowlik, who was born around 1920, and told Morey the story of his parents bringing him to the newly founded village. Pawaimukh is a village on the Burhi Dihing River. It is about seven miles downstream of Margherita. The community has about 40 houses along a single road. A Buddhist temple lies in the middle of the village, and in front of it is a small sand pagoda.

== Language Documentation ==
The Khamyang language appears in a number of linguistic surveys. One of the earliest linguistic surveys of the Assam region was done by Grierson, published in 1904 as the Linguistic Survey of India. Although Grierson did not mention Khamyang in his survey, he included a language called Nora that has not shown up in other surveys. Later, studies by Stephen Morey (2001-2), Anthony Diller (1992), and others were conducted on the Tai languages in Assam and included notes on Khamyang. Although there is no grammar for Khamyang specifically, Morey goes into some depth about the languages in The Tai Languages of Assam: A Grammar and Texts (Morey, 2005), and discusses its similarities with Tai Phake in chapter six of The Tai-Kadai Languages (Diller, Edmonson, Luo, 2008).

The written Khamyang language uses a modified Tai script, with marked tones to differentiate it from the other tonal Assamese Tai languages. The Khamyang tonal system has six tones with a different distribution from the six tones of the Phake. Several recordings of the Khamyang language have been uploaded to the internet, and include stories and conversations in the Khamyang language.

== Relationship between Khamyang and Nora ==
There is little documentation regarding the relationship between Khamyang and Nora. Some scholars posit that Khamyang and Nora are the same, or that the groups merged at one point in history. In the Linguistic Survey of India, Sir George Abraham Grierson did mention and exemplify the language of the Nora (nrr). In Grierson's description in 1904, he stated that there were around 300 speakers in his time. Additionally, he provided some phonological notes which suggest some similarities with present-day Khamyang, and also two texts, including some riddles.

Additionally, it is said by some Tai in India that Nora and Khamyang are identical languages, although according to the text, Linguist Stephen Morey has never heard the remaining Khamyang speakers refer to themselves as Nora.

== Vitality ==
Although the language is critically endangered, it is not yet moribund. There has been an attempt to pass the language on to the next generation; Morey writes that in 2001, a meeting of Khamyang elders was held, and the gathered decided to promote the speaking of the language in the village. In 2002, Chaw Mihingta began teaching the language to primary school-age children. Every day at around 4 pm, young children at the village primary school began attending Khamyang instruction. Their lessons consist of practicing writing numbers, lists of everyday words, short dialogues, and Tai characters.

Recently, the Endangered Languages Documentation Programme has set up a project to document the Khamyang language. It aims to document more of the Khamyang oral literature as well as the available written manuscripts to be used to "produce textbooks and other language learning materials for revitalizing the use of this language by its young native speakers".
