= Tai Aiton people =

Tai Aiton
Regions with significant populations
- India: <8,000

Languages
- Aiton, Assamese

Religion
- Theravada Buddhism

Related ethnic groups
- Other Tai peoples; (Thai people, Lao people, Shan people, Dai people, Tai Nua)

The Tai Aiton are one of the six indigenous Tai communities of Assam. They are Animist and Buddhist by religion. They speak the Tai Aiton language, which is similar to other Tai languages spoken in Thailand. They have been recognized as Scheduled Tribes (Hills) and are listed as Man-Tai speaking people by the Government of Assam.

Their population is unknown but is expected to be less than 8,000. The other indigenous Assamese communities commonly term them as Shyams or the people from Siam i.e. Thailand. The names of their villages are directly translatable into modern Thai, as both sounds and meaning correspond.

Man Tai Speaking people are not Ahom people as many may confuse them to be.

== History ==
They came to Assam far back in the 16th-17th century from the east crossing the Patkai hills.

They are Hinayana Buddhists and their language is close to that of North Eastern Thailand. Folklore says that there was a Tai Aiton hero, Pu Cham Deng, who fought against Burmese soldiers during their attack on the Ahom kingdom.

== Distribution ==
Presently, they live in small pockets in Upper Assam along with the Turung and Khamyang people.

They live in certain villages of Jorhat, Golaghat and Karbi Anglong districts.
