= Aiton language =

Tai language of Assam, India

Aiton
- (တႝ)ဢႝတွꩫ်
- Native to: India
- Region: Assam
- Ethnicity: Aiton people
- Native speakers: 1,500 (2006)
- Language family: Kra–Dai: Tai; Southwestern; Northwestern; Aiton
- Writing system: Burmese script (Aiton variation, called Lik-Tai)

Language codes
- ISO 639-3: aio
- Glottolog: aito1238
- ELP: Aiton
- Aiton is classified as Critically Endangered by the UNESCO Atlas of the World's Languages in Danger.

The Aiton language or Tai Aiton language is spoken in Assam, India, in the Dhonsiri Valley and the south bank of the Brahmaputra. It is currently classified as a threatened language, with fewer than 2,000 speakers worldwide. Its other names include Aitonia and Sham Doaniya.

== Classification ==
The Aiton language is a part of the Southwestern branch of the Tai family of languages. It is closely related to, and sometimes considered a dialect of, Shan. There are three other actively spoken languages of this branch in Assam: Khamti, Phake, and Khamyang.

== History ==
The Tai languages in Assam share many grammatical similarities, a writing system, and much of their vocabulary. The most prominent differences between the languages are their tonal systems.

According to the oral and written records of the Aiton people, they originated from a place named Khao-Khao Mao-Lung, a Burmese state near the Chinese border. It is generally believed that they came to India about two or three hundred years ago, seeking refuge from oppression. Despite how long they have been in Assam, many members of the older generations are not fluent in Assamese, the official language of the state.

== Geographic Distribution ==
Aiton is spoken predominantly in India, in the northeastern state of Assam.

According to Morey (2005), Aiton is spoken in the following villages:

Aiton Villages (Morey 2005)
Tai name	Translation of Tai name	Assamese/English name	District
baan^{3} nam^{3} thum^{3}	Flood village (บ้านน้ำท่วม)	Duburoni	Golaghat
baan^{3} sum^{3}	Sour village (บ้านส้ม)	Tengani	Golaghat
baan^{3} hui^{1} luŋ^{1}	Big fruit village	Borhola	Golaghat
baan^{3} hin^{1}	Stone village (บ้านหิน)	Ahomani	Karbi Anglong
baan^{3} luŋ^{1}	Big village (บ้านหลวง)	Bargaon	Karbi Anglong
baan^{3} nɔi^{2}/dɔi^{2}	Hill village (บ้านดอย)	Sukhihola	Karbi Anglong
baan^{3} saai^{2}	Sand village (บ้านทราย)	Kalyoni	Karbi Anglong
baan^{3} saai^{2}	Sand village (บ้านทราย)	Balipathar	Karbi Anglong
baan^{3} saai^{2}	Sand village (บ้านทราย)	Jonapathar	Lohit

Buragohain (1998) reports a total of 260 Aiton households, comprising a total population of 2,155.

Aiton Villages (Buragohain 1998)
Village	District	Year founded	No. of houses	Population
Ahomani	Karbi Anglong	1939	31	267
Baragaon	Karbi Anglong	1835	39	359
Balipathar	Karbi Anglong	1898	59	528
Chakihola	Karbi Anglong	unknown	18	180
Kaliyani	Karbi Anglong	Man era 1239	15	154
Borhola	Golaghat	1836	26	235
Dubarani	Golaghat	unknown	43	334
Tengani	Golaghat	unknown	19	150
Jonapathar	Lohit	1950s	15	148

== Phonology ==
=== Initial consonants ===
Morey reports the following initial consonants:

		Bilabial		Alveolar		Palatal		Velar		Glottal	
		voiceless	voiced	voiceless	voiced	voiceless	voiced	voiceless	voiced	voiceless	voiced
Plosive	Tenuis	p	b	t	d	c		k			ʔ
Plosive	Aspirated			tʰ							
Nasal			m		n		ɲ		ŋ		
Fricative		ɸ	β			ʃ	ʒ	x		h	
Lateral					l						
Trill					r						

Aiton, like some other Tai languages, have a "minimal three-way contrast in voicing". It also only allows vowels to be voiced stops when they are in bilabial and dental/alveolar places of articulation. According to Morey, "[m] and [n] are variants for /b/ and /d/, respectively". Aiton, has voiced /r, l, w, j/ and four voiced nasals in its sound inventory. It does not have voiceless sonorants.

=== Final consonants ===
Aiton has the following final consonants:

		Bilabial		Alveolar		Palatal		Velar		Glottal	
		voiceless	voiced	voiceless	voiced	voiceless	voiced	voiceless	voiced	voiceless	voiced
Plosive	Tenuis	p		t				k		ʔ	
Plosive	Aspirated										
Nasal			m		n				ŋ		
Semi-vowel							j		w		

-[w] occurs after front vowels and [a]-, -[j] occurs after back vowels and [a]-.

=== Tones ===
Aiton today uses three tones, however it originally used five but two have merged with other tones. The first tone still used today is 'mid/high level', the second tone is 'high level then falling' and the third is 'mid falling'. Originally, the fourth tone, 'mid rising', has merged with the first tone. The fifth tone, 'mid falling glottalised', has merged with the third tone.

=== Vowels ===
Aiton has a vowel system of only seven vowels, /i, ɯ, u, ɛ, ɔ, a, aa/, which is the smallest out of all the Tai languages spoken in Assam. From these seven vowels, Aiton allows only nine possible sequences.

== Grammar ==
=== Pronouns ===
The following set of pronouns are the pronouns found in the Aiton language:

Word	Meaning
/kaw1/	I (1SG)
/maɯ1/	You (2SG)
/mɯn1/	He/She/It (3SG)
/haw1/	We (1PL)
/su3/	You (2PL)
/kʰaw3/	They (3PL)

=== Demonstratives ===
Note: the form /-an2/ is a post-clitic form that approaches a definite article in function and may be attached to pronouns and even verbs.

Deictics	Meaning
/nay2/	This, here
/nan2/, /han2/	That, there
/-an2/	That, there

=== Classifiers ===
The most common classifiers are:

- kɔ^{1} for persons
- tu^{1}/to^{1} for animals
- ʔan for inanimate objects

== Writing system ==
The Tai Aiton have their own writing system called 'Lik-Tai', which they share with the Khamti people and Tai Phake people. It closely resembles the Northern Shan script of Myanmar, which is a variant of the Burmese script, with some of the letters taking divergent shapes.

=== Consonants ===
က ka IPA: [k]	ၵ kha IPA: [kʰ]	င nga IPA: [ŋ]
ꩡ ca IPA: [t͡ʃ]	ꩬ sa IPA: [s]	ၺ nya IPA: [ɲ]
တ ta IPA: [t]	ထ tha IPA: [tʰ]	ꩫ na IPA: [n]
ပ pa IPA: [p]	ၸ pha/fa IPA: [pʰ/ɸ]	မ ma IPA: [m]
ယျ ya/ja IPA: [j/ɟ]	ꩺြ ra IPA: [r]	လ la IPA: [l]
ဝ wa IPA: [w]	ꩭ ha IPA: [h]	ဢ a IPA: [ʔ]
ဒ da IPA: [d]	ဗ ba/wa IPA: [b/w]	

=== Vowels ===
ႜ a IPA: [a]	ႃ aa IPA: [aː]	ိ i IPA: [i]	ီ ī IPA: [iː]
ု u IPA: [u]	ူ ū IPA: [uː]	ေ e/ae IPA: [eː/ɛ]	ႝ ai IPA: [ai]
ေႃ o/aw IPA: [oː/ɔː]	ံ ṁ IPA: [ŋ̊]	ိ်ုွ ue IPA: [ɯ]	်ၞ aeu IPA: [ɛu]
်ွ aau IPA: [aːu]	ွဝ် au IPA: [au]	ွ aw IPA: [ɒ]	ွႝ oi IPA: [oi]
ွံ om IPA: [ɔm]	ိ်ွ iu IPA: [ɛu/iu]	ုံ um IPA: [um]	်ံ em IPA: [em]
် virama

=== Other symbols ===
! ꩷	1 ꩸	2 ꩹
