= Tai Nuea people =

Ethnic group

Tai Nuea
ᥖᥭᥰ ᥘᥫᥴ ᥖᥭᥰ ᥖᥬᥲ ᥑᥨᥒᥰ
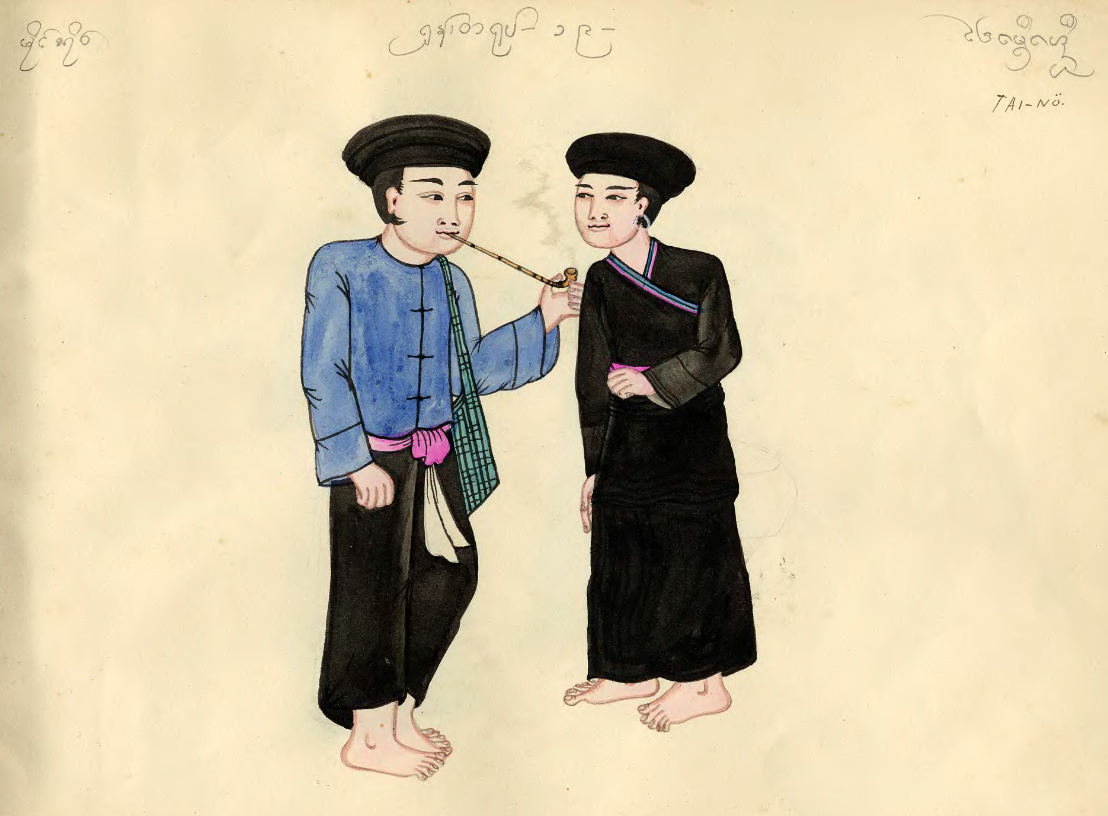
- Tai Nuea in Burmese tribal records

Total population
- 540,000–700,000 (?)

Regions with significant populations
- China (Yunnan Province) Thailand Laos Myanmar (Shan State and Kachin State)

Languages
- Tai Nuea

Religion
- Buddhism and Tai folk religion

Related ethnic groups
- Ahom people, Lao people, Shan people, Thai people

Tai Nuea (Dehong Dai: ᥖᥭᥰ ᥘᥫᥴ Tai Lə; Chinese: 傣那 Dǎinà; Burmese: တိုင်းလေ), also spelled Tai Nüa, is one of the Tai ethnicities in China and Southeast Asia. They are primarily found in the Yunnan Province of China, Laos, Thailand, Myanmar, and Vietnam, with some immigrating to the United States. There are two unrelated groups of people referred to by the name Tai Nuea: one primarily in China, Myanmar (Burma), and parts of northwestern Laos, and the other group primarily in northeastern Laos.

== Ethnonyms ==
Tai Nuea can be written as Tai Neua, Tai Nuea, Tai Nüa, or Dai Nua, and sometimes Tai Nau. They are also known as Dehong Dai, Dehong Tailurian, and Chinese Shan. The word Nuea (Thai: เหนือ, Dehong Dai: ᥘᥫᥴ Lə) in the Tai languages means "north", so Tai Nuea (Thai: ไทเหนือ, Dehong Dai: ᥖᥭᥰ ᥘᥫᥴ) means "Northern Tai" and is used by Tai people to refer to other Tai groups living to the north. However, the naming of the Tai people can be confusing; some publications may also use Dai Kong, Dai Loe, Tai Mao, and others. Two different groups of Tai people are called Tai Nuea. Dehong is a Sinicized form meaning "Tai from the Hong River," which is the Tai name for the Salween River.

== History ==
The Tai Nuea (also known as Tai Le) were among the prominent ethnic groups in southwest China whose influence expanded during the 17th and 18th centuries under the Tusi (native chieftain) system. Originating from an area historically known as Muang Nuea (Northern Country), they are culturally linked to the ancient Mong Mao kingdom. Their historical polity was centered at Muang Boo, with other significant urban centers including Muang Khwan and Muang Guoen Mai.

Tai Nuea society was historically organized under traditional hereditary rulers known as Saopha (Lords of the Sky). In the context of Myanmar’s history, the Tai Nuea are closely linked to the northernmost Shan principalities. During the Konbaung Dynasty (18th–19th century), Tai Nuea regions served as a strategic buffer and cultural bridge between the Burmese Empire and the Qing Dynasty. Following the Anglo-Burmese Wars, the delimitation of the China-Burma border in the late 19th century formally divided the Tai Nuea population between Northern Shan State (Myanmar) and Yunnan Province (China).

The 20th century brought further displacement, particularly during the Laotian Civil War (1960s–1970s). Following the communist takeover of Laos in 1975, many Tai Nuea families from Muang Sing fled to Bokeo Province (notably Ban Namkeung Mai). Today, despite being divided by modern national frontiers, the Tai Nuea maintain a resilient cross-border identity through their shared language, the unique Tai Le script, and enduring kinship ties across the China-Myanmar-Laos borderlands.

== Demographics ==
The Tai Nuea people are primarily concentrated in the border regions between southwest China and northeast Myanmar. Their distribution follows the historical migration routes along the Shweli and Salween river valleys.

In China, the Tai Nuea are officially classified as part of the Dai ethnic group. They represent the largest Dai subgroup in the western part of Yunnan. The majority reside in the Dehong Dai and Jingpo Autonomous Prefecture, particularly in Mangshi, Ruili, and Lianghe County. As of 2026, the population in Yunnan is estimated at approximately 650,000. Unlike the Tai Lue of Sipsongpanna, the Tai Nuea of Dehong have a distinct written script (Tai Le script) and unique cultural traditions influenced by their proximity to the highlands.

In Myanmar, they are mostly found in Northern Shan State, specifically in areas bordering China such as Muse, Namkham, and Kutkai. Significant communities also exist in the Kachin State border towns. There is a high degree of fluid movement and trade between the Tai Nuea of Namkham (Myanmar) and Ruili (China), as these communities share the same dialects and kinship ties. Estimates suggest around 100,000 to 150,000 Tai Nuea speakers reside within Myanmar’s borders.

== Language ==
The Tai Nuea language is closely related to other Tai languages. It has its own script, the Tai Le or Dehong Dai script, used in Yunnan, China. However, the Tai Nuea people of Houaphanh Province in Laos speak a different dialect from those in Yunnan and Burma; the dialect spoken in Yunnan is a Southwestern Tai dialect, while the Laotian dialect (Neua language) has Northern Tai features.

== Culture ==
The Tai Nuea people have their own culture, traditions, language, and literature.

=== New Year ===
Among their many festivities is the New Year celebration, "Jin Leun Sam", which typically falls on the first day of the third month of the lunar calendar. The New Year celebration is an important festival in Tai Nuea tradition, with people living outside their hometown returning to celebrate with family and friends.

The festivities may last up to a week, with activities such as swinging on the "Ki Tong Ja", playing with spinning tops, and participating in competitions like "Toh Mark Khang" and tossing bean bags "Peak Gon". This is also a time for children to ask for forgiveness from their elders ("Su Ma") by preparing an offering of flowers. On the last day of the festival, an effigy of a bull is created from straw and is burned in a ceremony to symbolize the departure of the old year.

It is also the time for the Tai Neua people to make traditional cakes, such as sesame rice cakes ("Khao Pook Nga") and rice ball cakes ("Kao Ke Mah"). People invite friends and family to join them for special meals throughout the week, culminating on the first day of the New Year ("Meu Ho Leun Sam"). The final celebration takes place at the temple, where a big festivity is held with the blessing of the monks.

=== Performing arts ===
Daiju (傣剧), classified as a form of "minority drama" (shaoshan minzu xiqu, 少数民族戏曲), is most popular in the Dehong Dai and Jingpo Autonomous Prefecture, as well as in neighboring Baoshan, both of which are located in the westernmost part of Yunnan Province, bordering Burma's Kachin and Shan states. It combines traditional Dai music and dance with stories drawn from long narrative poems (叙事长诗) and folk tales (often from Buddhist traditions), blending elements from Han Chinese theatrical traditions, including Dianju (滇剧, Yunnan opera), Beijing opera, and piyingxi (皮影戏, shadow puppet plays).

The genre originated during the late Qing Dynasty when Dai traditional artists and intellectuals worked to translate scripts from Beijing opera, Sichuan opera, and Dianju into the Dai language, creating a new form of theater for Dai people. During the reign of the Tongzhi Emperor (同治帝, r. 1861–1875), Shang He (尚贺), a resident of Yingjiang County (盈江县, then known as Ganya, 干崖) in what is now Dehong Prefecture, drew on old Dai literature to create the first Daiju play, entitled "Xiang Meng" (相勐).

== See also ==
- Tai languages
- Tai people
- Shan people
- Ahom people
- Tai Khün
