= Khamti people =

Ethnic group of India, China and Myanmar

Tai Khamti
တဲး ၵံးတီ, 康迪
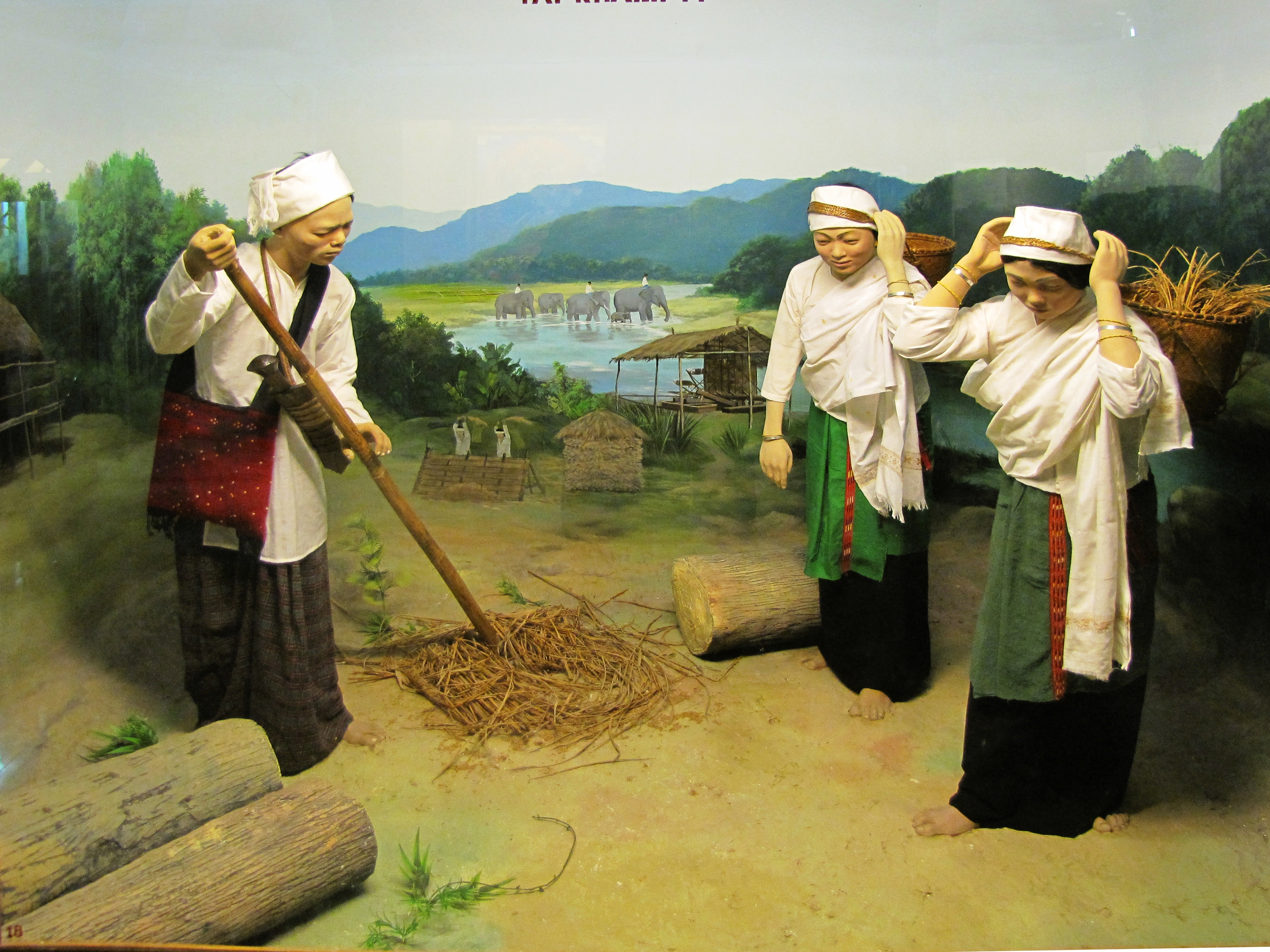
- Diorama and wax figures of Tai Khamti people in Jawaharlal Nehru Museum, Itanagar

Total population
- c. 30,000

Regions with significant populations
- India: 16,944
- Myanmar: 8,000
- China: 5,000

Languages
- Khamti, Burmese

Religion
- Theravada Buddhism, Tai folk religion

Related ethnic groups
- Other Tai peoples; (Shan, Thai, Lao, Dai, and Tai Nua peoples)

Khamti people

Chinese name
- Chinese: 康迪人
Transcriptions
Standard Mandarin
- Hanyu Pinyin: Kāng dí rén

Burmese name
- Burmese: ခန္တီးရှမ်းလူမျိုး

Thai name
- Thai: ชาวไทคำตี่

The Tai Khamti (Khamti: တဲး ၵံးတီႈ), also known as the Hkamti Shan (Burmese: ခန္တီးရှမ်းလူမျိုး; Chinese: 康迪人; Ahom: 𑜄𑜩:𑜁𑜡𑜉𑜄𑜣; Thai: ชาวไทคำตี่), or simply as Khamti, are a Tai ethnic group of India, Myanmar and China.

The Tai-Khamti are followers of Theravada Buddhism. The Tai-Khamti have their own script for their language, known as 'Lik Tai', which originated from the Shan (Tai) script of Myanmar. Their mother tongue is known as Khamti language. It is a Tai language, closely related to Thai and Lao.

== Population ==
According to 2011 census of India, the Tai Khamtis have a population of 16,944. In Myanmar, their total population is about 8,000 in 2009, although self reported village census estimates put it at 200,000 people.

== Distribution ==
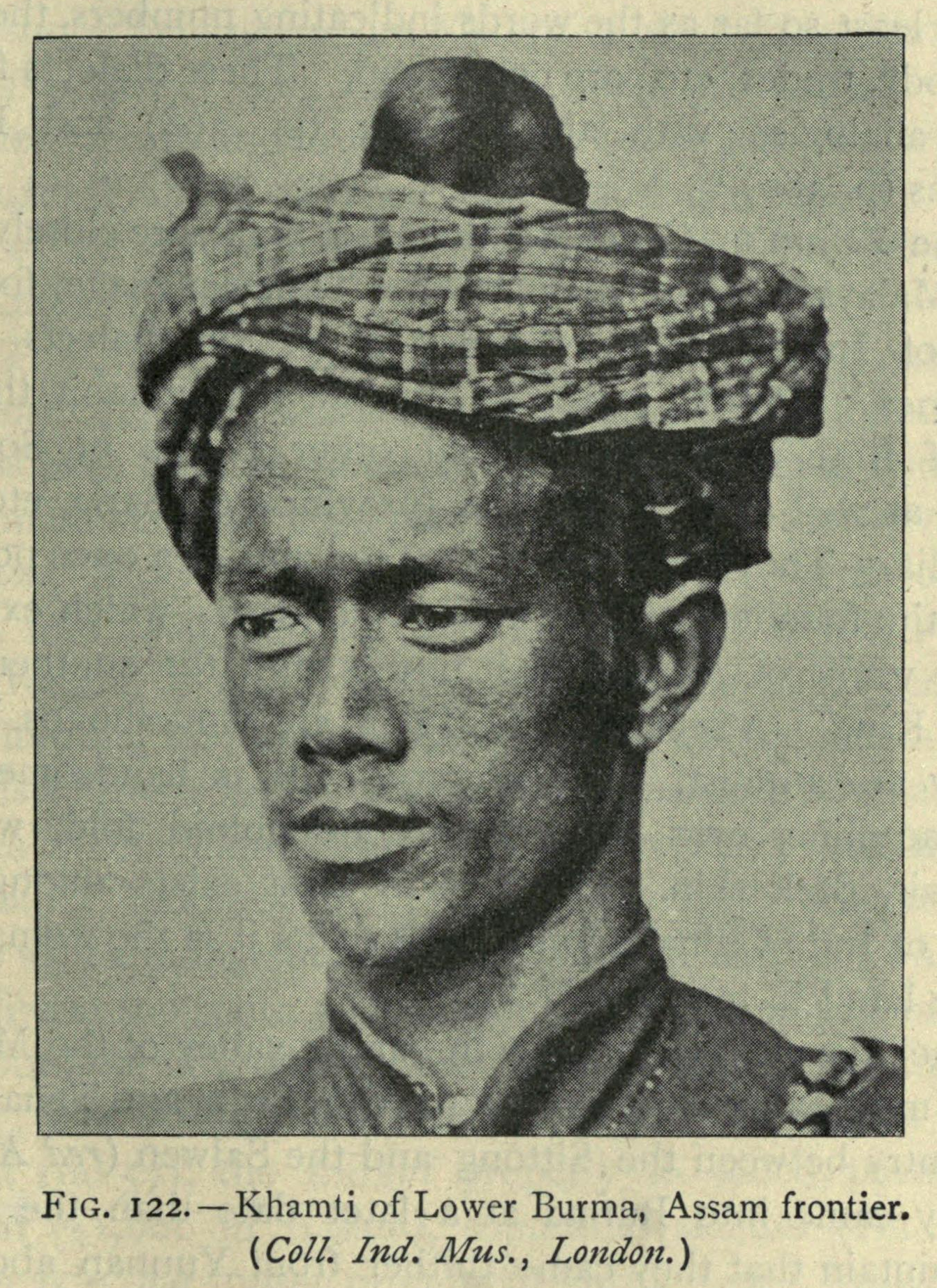
Khamti man from 1913

The Tai Khamtis who inhabit the region around the Tengapani basin of Arunachal Pradesh were descendants of migrants who came during the eighteenth century from the Shan region of Hkamti Long, in the western source of the Irrawaddy River Valley.

They are located in Hkamti Long, Mogaung and Myitkyina regions of Kachin State as well as Hkamti District of Sagaing Division of Myanmar. In India, they are found in Namsai district and Changlang district of Arunachal Pradesh. Smaller numbers are present in Lakhimpur district, Dhemaji district and Munglang Khamti village in Tinsukia district of Assam and possibly in some parts of China.

== Society ==
The Khamti society is divided into classes, each signifying distinct status in the social hierarchy. The chiefs occupy the highest positions, followed by the priests, who wield considerable influence over all ranks. In the past, the slaves constituted the lowest rank.

== Culture ==
=== Lifestyle and customs ===
The Tai-Khamti are strong believers in Theravada Buddhism. Homes typically have a prayer room, where they pray every morning and evening, offering flowers (nam taw yongli) and food (khao tang som). The Tai-Khamti people are traditionally peaceful.

Their houses are built on raised floors with thatched roofs, constructed low enough so that the walls remain concealed. Wooden planks are used for flooring, while the walls are made from bamboo splices.

The Khamti are settled agriculturists who use a plough (thaie) drawn by a single animal, such as an ox, buffalo, or even an elephant in ancient times.

The Khamti cultivate crops like paddy rice (khow), mustard/sesame seeds (nga), and potatoes (man-kala). Rice is their staple food, usually complemented by vegetables, meat, and fish. They also drink a beer made from rice (lau), though it is not served during festivals. Some well-known dishes include khao puk (sticky rice and sesame seeds), khao lam (bamboo rice), paa sa (fresh river fish soup with special herbs), paa som, and nam som, among others. Beef is considered taboo.

The Tai-Khamti are credited as the first people to have introduced tea drinking to India. However, there is no substantial documentation on the history of tea consumption in the Indian subcontinent before the colonial era. Tea leaves, native to some parts of India, may have been used since ancient times. The Singpho and Khamti tribes, inhabiting regions where the Camellia sinensis plant grew naturally, have been consuming tea since the 12th century. It is possible that tea was known under a different name. Frederick R. Dannaway, in his essay "Tea As Soma," suggests that tea may have been referred to as "Soma" in Indian mythology.

=== Language and script ===
Khamti is a Southwestern Tai language spoken in Myanmar and India by the Khamti people. It is a Daic language, specifically belonging to the Kadai, Kam-Tai, Tai, Southwestern, Northwest branch. The language likely originated around Mogoung in Upper Myanmar and is closely related to Thai and Lao. The name "Khamti" translates to "place of gold", from kham 'gold' and -ti 'place'.

There are three dialects of Khamti: North Burma Khamti, India Khamti, and Sinkaling Khamti. Khamti speakers are bilingual, often fluent in Assamese and Burmese.

The Tai-Khamti people have their own writing system, called 'Lik-Tai', which closely resembles the Northern Shan script of Myanmar, though some characters differ. This script is derived from the Lik Tho Ngok script used for centuries. The script includes 35 letters, consisting of 17 consonants and 14 vowels. Traditionally, it is taught in monasteries, where subjects like the Tripitaka, Jataka tales, codes of conduct, doctrines and philosophy, history, law codes, astrology, and palmistry are studied. The first printed book in this script was published in 1960. It was revised in 1992 by the Tai Literature Committee in Chongkham, and further modified in 2003 with tone markings by scholars from Northern Myanmar and Arunachal Pradesh.

=== Dress ===
Traditional men's dress consists of a full-sleeved cotton shirt (siu pachai) and a multi-colored sarong (phanoi). Women's attire includes a long-sleeve shirt (siu pasao), a deep-colored long sarong (sinh) made from cotton or silk, and a colored silk scarf (phamai). Married women wear a plain black long wrap-around sarong (sinn) with a shorter green wrap-around cloth (langwat) worn over it.

Jewelry includes bright amber earplugs, coral, beaded necklaces, silver hairpins, bangles, and gold ornaments. Khamti men traditionally tattoo their bodies.

The Khamti wear their hair in a large knot supported by a white turban (pha-ho). Chiefs wear long silk coats, and their hair is drawn up from the back and sides into a roll four to five inches in length. This roll is encircled with an embroidered band, the fringed and tasseled ends of which hang behind.

=== Arts ===
The Khamti are renowned for their craftsmanship. Their swords, known as pha-nap, are prized, and their priests are amateur craftsmen who carve religious statues from wood, bone, or ivory.

The Khamti are skilled in shaping ivory handles for weapons, which are seen as a mark of great craftsmanship. Their weapons include poisoned bamboo spikes (panjis), spears, bows and arrows, swords, and shields, often made from rhinoceros or buffalo hide. They also possess firearms resembling old flint muskets and horse pistols. The sword is carried on the front of the body, so its hilt can be easily grasped with the right hand if needed.

=== Dance and drama ===
The dance "Ka Poong Tai" is one of the main dramatic art forms of the Tai-Khamti. Unlike many traditional Arunachali dances, Khamti dance is a dramatic performance reflecting the culture of the Khamti people.

Tai-Khamti folk dances have roots in Southeast Asian countries like Thailand and Myanmar. Many of their dances have religious themes. Some of the most prominent Tai-Khamti dances or dramas include:

- Peacock Dance (Kaa Kingnara Kingnari): This dance depicts the graceful movements of a mythical half-human, half-peacock creature from the Himalayas, reflecting Buddhist beliefs in nature.
- Cockfight Dance (Kaa Kong Tou Kai): Performed by two or four dancers wearing headgear shaped like a cock's head, this dance, accompanied by drumbeats (kongpat), cymbals (paiseng), and gongs (mong-seeing), mimics a cockfight, a tradition once used to entertain kings.
- Deer Dance (Kaa-Toe): Celebrated during the light festival in October (Nuen-Sip-Eit), this dance marks the return of the Buddha after preaching to his mother and other spirits. The dance, rooted in Buddhist beliefs, is a symbol of reverence.
- Demon Dance (Kaa Phi Phai): This dance portrays the victory of good over evil, with the Buddha achieving enlightenment despite the attempts of Mara, the king of evil spirits, to disturb his meditation. It symbolizes the Buddha’s attainment of Nirvana.

=== Festivals ===
The main festival of the Khamti is Sangken, celebrated on 14 April. During this festival, people of all tribes, castes, cultures, and races participate in rituals that involve splashing clean water, symbolizing peace and purity. Buddha images are taken for a ceremonial bath, and the procession is accompanied by drums, dances, and festivities. The celebration lasts for three days, during which locals prepare homemade sweets and exchange gifts.

In addition to Sangken, other festivals celebrated throughout the year include Poi-Pee-Mau (Tai Khampti New Year), Mai-Kasung-Phai, Khoa-Wa, and Poat-Wa.

== Notable people ==
- Chow Khamoon Gohain, politician
- Chow Chandret Gohain, politician
- Chow Tewa Mein, politician
- Chau Zingnu Namchoom, politician
- Chowna Mein, Deputy Chief Minister of Arunachal Pradesh
- Indrajit Namchoom, footballer
