= Khamti language =

Kra–Dai language spoken in India and Myanmar

Khamti
- (တဲး)ၵမ်းတီႈ / (တဲး)ၵံးတီႈ (Tai) Khamti
- Region: India, Myanmar
- Ethnicity: Khamti
- Native speakers: (13,000 cited 2000–2007)
- Language family: Kra–Dai: Tai; Southwestern; Northwestern; Khamti
- Writing system: Burmese script (Khamti variation, called Lik-Tai)

Language codes
- ISO 639-3: kht
- Glottolog: kham1290
- ELP: Khamti
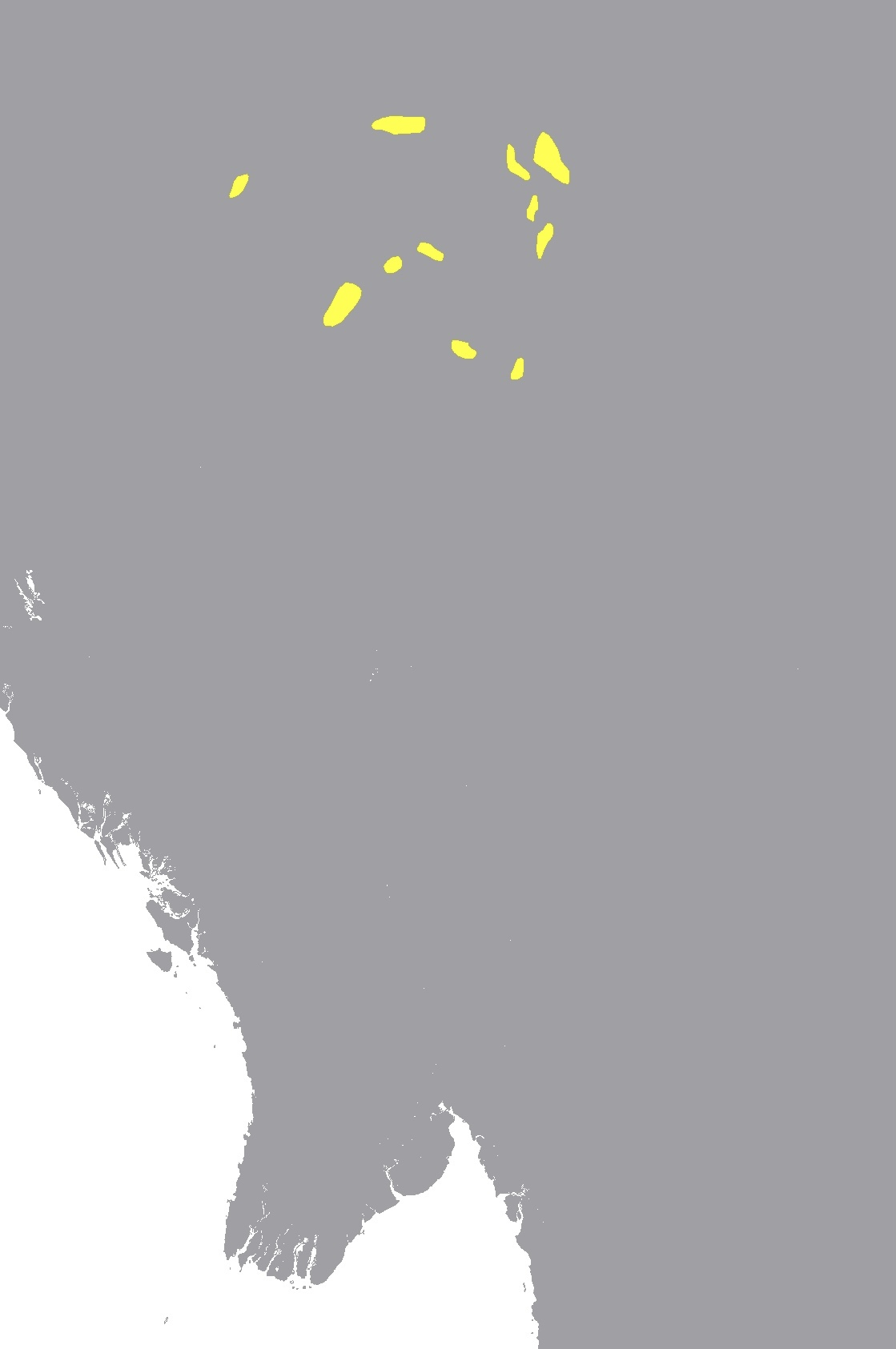

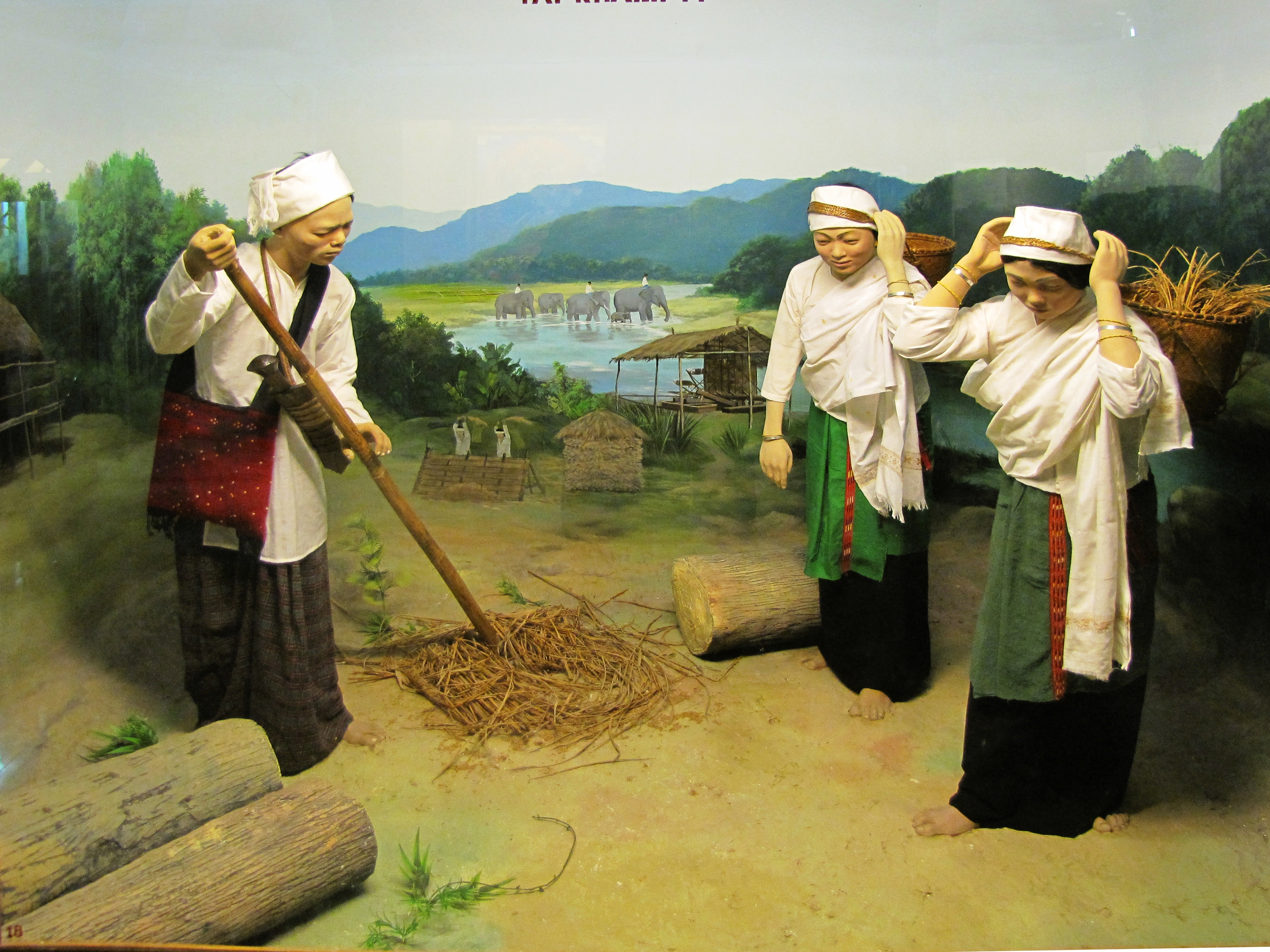
Diorama and wax figures of Khamti people in Jawaharlal Nehru Museum, Itanagar.

The Khamti language is a Southwestern Tai language spoken in India and Myanmar by the Khamti people. It is closely related to the Shan language.

== Name ==
Khamti has been variously rendered Hkamti, Khampti, Kam Ti, Kamti, Tai Kam Ti, Tai-Khamti, Khamti Shan, Khampti Shan, Khandi Shan, Hkampti Shan, and Khampti Sam (Burmese: ခန္တီးရှမ်းလူမျိုး). The name "Khamti" translates to "place of gold", from kham 'gold' and -ti 'place'.

== Demographics ==
In Burma, Khamti is spoken by 3,500 near Myitkyina and by 4,500 in Putao District, Kachin State (both reported in 2000). In India, it is spoken by 5,000 in Assam and Arunachal Pradesh, in the Dikrong Valley, Narayanpur, and north bank of the Brahmaputra (reported in 2007).

Three dialects of Khamti are known: North Burma Khamti, Assam Khamti, and Sinkaling Khamti. All speakers of Khamti are bilingual, largely in Assamese and Burmese.

Possibly, there are also some Khamti in some parts of China (5,000 people).

== History ==
The language seems to have originated around Mogoung in Upper Burma. Mung Kang was captured, a large group of Khamtis moved to the north and east of Lakhimpur. In the year 1850, 300–400 Khamtis settled in Assam.

== Phonology ==
=== Initial consonants ===
Khamti has the following initial consonants:

		Bilabial	Alveolar	Palatal	Velar	Glottal
Nasal		m	n	(ɲ)	ŋ	
Plosive	tenuis	p	t	c	k	ʔ
Plosive	aspirated	pʰ	tʰ		kʰ	
Fricative			s			h
Approximant		w	l	j		
Trill			(r)			

The palatal occlusive /c/ can be heard as [c] or [tʃ] across dialects. The sibilant /s/ can also be heard as [ʃ].

The palatal nasal /ɲ/ and the rhotic /r/ are only used in the Myanmar variety.

=== Final consonants ===
Khamti has the following final consonants:

		Bilabial	Alveolar	Palatal	Velar	Glottal
Nasal		m	n		ŋ	
Plosive	tenuis	p	t		k	ʔ
Approximant		w		j		

-[w] occurs after front vowels and [a]-, -[j] occurs after back vowels and [a]-.

=== Vowels ===
The Khamti language uses the following vowels:

	Front		Back			
	unr.		unr.		rnd.	
	short	long	short	long	short	long
Close	i	iː	ɯ	ɯː	u	uː
Mid	e	eː	ɤ		o	oː
Open	ɛ	ɛː	a	aː	ɔ	ɔː
Diphthong	ia		aɯ		ua	

/ɤ/ only appears in the dialect in Myanmar.

=== Tones ===
Khamti uses five tones, namely: low falling /21/, mid rising /34/, mid falling /42/, high falling /53/~[33], and high level /55/~[44].

== Grammar ==
=== Syntax ===
Unlike other Tai languages that display SVO word order, Khamti has SOV word order.

=== Nouns ===
Nouns are divided into common nouns and proper nouns.

==== Common nouns ====
Common nouns can pluralized by adding /nai^{1} khau/ behind the noun. Common nouns are class categorized by using classifiers such as the generic /an^{3}/, /ko^{1}/ for people and /to^{1}/ for animals.

==== Proper nouns ====
People's names and place names are classified as proper nouns. Khamti prefixes people's names, depending on the social class or status of that person. These prefixes are gender specific. The prefix for Miss is /na:ng^{4}/ and the prefix for Mr is /tsa:i^{3}/. A prefix for Mr used to respectfully address a male of higher status is /tsau^{2}/ or /tsau^{2} nuai/.

=== Pronouns ===
Khamti uses a triparte pronoun system, consisting of singular, dual and plural forms. The dual form and the first person plural form are further divided between inclusive and exclusive forms. The following set of pronouns are the pronouns found in the Khamti language:

		singular	dual	plural
1st person	inclusive	/kau^{3}/	/ha:^{4}/	/haw^{1}/
1st person	exclusive	/kau^{3}/	/hang^{4} khe:u/	/tu:^{3}/
2nd person		/maeu^{4}/	/suang khe:u/	/su^{3}/
3rd person		/man^{4}/	/suang kha:/	/khau/

=== Demonstratives ===
Khamti uses the following demonstratives:

Demonstratives
	singular	plural
near	/an^{3} nai^{1}/ 'this'	/an^{3} nai^{1} nai^{1} khau/ 'these'
approximate	/amaeu^{4} nai^{1}/ 'that near you'	/amaeu^{4} nai^{1} khau/ 'those by you'
distal	/an^{3} pu:n nai^{1}/ 'that over there'	/an^{3} pu:n nai^{1} nai^{1} khau/ 'those over there'

== Writing system ==
The Tai Khamtis have their own writing system called 'Lik-Tai', which they share with the Tai Phake people and Tai Aiton people. It closely resembles the Northern Shan script of Myanmar, which is a variant of the Mon–Burmese script, with some of the letters taking divergent shapes. Their script is evidently derived from the Lik Tho Ngok script since hundreds of years ago. There are 35 letters including 17 consonants and 14 vowels. The script is traditionally taught in monasteries on subjects like Tripitaka, Jataka tales, code of conduct, doctrines and philosophy, history, law codes, astrology, and palmistry etc. The first printed book was published in 1960. In 1992 it was edited by the Tai Literature Committee, Chongkham. In 2003 it was again modified with tone marking by scholars of Northern Myanmar and Arunachal Pradesh.

=== Consonants ===
က ka IPA: k	ၵ kha IPA: kʰ	ꩠ ga IPA: ɡ	ၷ gha IPA: ɡʱ	င nga IPA: ŋ
ꩡ ca IPA: c	ꩢ cha IPA: cʰ	ꩣ ja IPA: ɟ	ꩤ jha IPA: ɟʱ	ꩥ nya IPA: ɲ
ꩦ ṭa IPA: ʈ	ꩧ ṭha IPA: ʈʰ	ꩨ ḍa IPA: ɖ	ꩩ ḍha IPA: ɖʱ	ၼ ṇa IPA: ɳ
တ ta IPA: t	ထ tha IPA: tʰ	ၻ da IPA: d	ꩪ dha IPA: dʱ	ꩫ na IPA: n
ပ pa IPA: p	ၸ pha IPA: pʰ	ၿ ba IPA: b	ၹ bha IPA: bʱ	မ ma IPA: m
ယ ya IPA: j	ꩳရ ra IPA: r~ɹ	လ la IPA: l	ဝ wa IPA: w~v	ꩬ sa IPA: s
ꩭ ha IPA: h	ꩮ ḷa IPA: ɭ	ꩯ fa IPA: f	ꩲ za IPA: z	ꩱ xa IPA: x
	ꩴ oay IPA: oaʲ	ꩵ qn IPA: qⁿ	ꩶ hm IPA: mʰ	ဢ a IPA: ʔ

=== Vowels ===
ႊ a IPA: a	ၢ ā IPA: aː	ႃ ā IPA: aː	
ိ i IPA: i	ီ ī IPA: iː	ု u IPA: u	ူ ū IPA: uː
ေ e IPA: eː	ူဝ် o IPA: oː	ဲ ai IPA: ai	ၢဲ aai IPA: aːi
ဝ် au IPA: au	်ွ au IPA: au	ၢဝ် aau IPA: aːu	ံ aṁ IPA: (a)ŋ̊
ႄ ae IPA: ɛ	ေႃ aw IPA: ɔ	ွ aw IPA: ɔ	ိဝ် iu IPA: iu
ႅ ia IPA: ia	ႅဝ် iau IPA: iau	ျႃ iaa IPA: iaː	ိူ oe IPA: ɤ
ွဲ oi IPA: oi	ွ ua IPA: ua	ဴွ uai IPA: uai	ွႃ uaa IPA: uaː
ေူ ui IPA: ui	ို ue IPA: ɯ	ိုဝ် uee IPA: ɯː	ုဝ် uo IPA: wo
ႂ် aue IPA: aɯ	ိုဝ် uea IPA: ɯa		

=== Tones and other diacritics ===
Displaying with the dummy letter ဢ,

- tone 1 [21]:
  - for checked syllable, including single consonant — ဢႉ
  - for else — ဢႇ
- tone 2 [34] — ဢႛ
- tone 3 [42] — ဢႈ
- tone 4 [53] — ဢး — In speaking, it may become [33].
- tone 5:
  - for short open syllable — ဢႚ [44] (rare usage)
  - for else — ဢ [55] (unmarked)
- ဢ် — asat — final consonant, silences inherent vowel
- ꩰ — duplication
