= Turung people =

Buddhist community found in Assam, northeast India

Total population
- 10,000

Regions with significant populations
- India (Assam; Arunachal Pradesh)

Languages
- Assamese, Turung (former)

Religion
- Buddhism

Related ethnic groups
- Singpho, Bamars

The Turung people or Tai Turung, are a numerically small Buddhist community in the northeastern Indian state of Assam. They speak their own Turung language.

They originally migrated from Upper Burma and settled in Assam in the latter part of 18th century. During migration, they were captured and made slaves by the Singpho people and hence have had a lot of Singpho influences on their culture, language, and lifestyle.

Theirs population was counted as 301 in the census of 1891. The present population of the community is unknown but is believed to be around 10,000.

== Origin ==
Although the origin of the word Turung is not known, many believe that it is derived from the name of a river in Patkai region named Turungpani. Another school of thought is that the word Turung is derived from the word Tai Long meaning Great Tai since these people were of Shan origin.

== Distribution ==
They presently reside in certain pockets in Upper Assam in the districts of Golaghat, Jorhat and Karbi Anglong.
