= Turung language =

Jingpho dialect of Assam, India

Turung
- Native to: India
- Region: Assam
- Ethnicity: Turung people
- Native speakers: 1,000 (2006)
- Language family: Sino-Tibetan: Sal; Jingpho–Luish; Jingpho; Turung
- Writing system: Eastern Nagari, Latin script

Language codes
- ISO 639-3: try
- Glottolog: turu1252

The Turung language is an endangered Sino-Tibetan language, closely related to Singpho, spoken in seven villages in central Assam. Many Turung people now speak Assamese.

The total population of the ethnic group is over 30,000, and they primarily live in the Jorhat, Golaghat and Karbi Anglong districts of Assam.

== Possible Tai language existence ==
The ancestors of the modern Turung people possibly spoke a Tai language that was called Turung or Tairong and is now extinct. The modern Turung language is influenced by Tai languages.

== Sources ==
- Morey, Stephen. 2005. The Tai languages of Assam: a grammar and texts. Canberra: Pacific Linguistics.
