= Hindu–Arabic numeral system =

Most common system for writing numbers

Modern-day Arab telephone keypad with two forms of Arabic numerals: Western Arabic numerals on the left and Eastern Arabic numerals on the right

The Hindu–Arabic numeral system (also known as the Indo-Arabic numeral system, Hindu numeral system, and Arabic numeral system) (Note: Hindu was the Persian name for "Indian" in the 10th century, when the Arabs adopted the number system. The use of "Hindu" to refer to a religion was a later development.) is a base ten (decimal) positional numeral system. It is presently the most common decimal system.

The system was invented between the 1st and 4th centuries by Indian mathematicians. By the 9th century, the system was adopted by Arabic mathematicians who extended it to include fractions. It became more widely known through the writings in Arabic of the Persian mathematician Al-Khwārizmī (On the Calculation with Hindu Numerals, c. 825) and Arab mathematician Al-Kindi (On the Use of the Hindu Numerals, c. 830). The system had spread to medieval Europe by the High Middle Ages, notably following Fibonacci's 13th century Liber Abaci; until the evolution of the printing press in the 15th century, use of the system in Europe was mainly confined to Northern Italy.

It is based upon ten glyphs representing the numbers from zero to nine, and allows representing any natural number by a unique sequence of these glyphs. The symbols (glyphs) used to represent the system are in principle independent of the system itself. The glyphs in actual use are descended from Brahmi numerals and have split into various typographical variants since the Middle Ages.

These symbol sets can be divided into three main families: Eastern Arabic numerals used in the Middle East; Indian numerals in various scripts used in the Indian subcontinent; and Western Arabic numerals used everywhere else.

== Positional notation ==
The Hindu–Arabic system is designed for positional notation in a decimal system. In a more developed form, positional notation also uses a decimal marker (at first a mark over the ones digit but now more commonly a decimal point or a decimal comma which separates the ones place from the tenths place), and also a symbol for "these digits recur ad infinitum". In modern usage, this latter symbol is usually a vinculum (a horizontal line placed over the repeating digits). In this more developed form, the numeral system can symbolize any rational number using only 13 symbols (the ten digits, decimal marker, vinculum, and a prepended minus sign to indicate a negative number).

Although generally found in text written with the Arabic abjad, which is written right-to-left, numbers written with these numerals place the most-significant digit to the left, so they read from left to right (though digits are not always said in order from most to least significant). The requisite changes in reading direction are found in text that mixes left-to-right writing systems with right-to-left systems.

== Symbols ==
Various symbol sets are used to represent numbers in the Hindu–Arabic numeral system, most of which developed from the Brahmi numerals.

The symbols used to represent the system have split into various typographical variants since the Middle Ages, arranged in three main groups:

- The widespread Western Arabic numerals used with the Latin, Cyrillic, and Greek alphabets in the table, descended from the West Arabic numerals which were developed in al-Andalus and the Maghreb (there are two typographic styles for rendering western Arabic numerals, known as lining figures and text figures).
- The Arabic–Indic orEastern Arabic numerals used with Arabic script, developed primarily in what is now Iraq. A variant of the Eastern Arabic numerals is used in Persian and Urdu.
- The Indian numerals in use with scripts of the Brahmic family in India and Southeast Asia. Each of the roughly dozen major scripts of India has its own numeral glyphs (as one will note when perusing Unicode character charts).

=== Glyph comparison ===
Symbol										Used with scripts	Numerals
0	1	2	3	4	5	6	7	8	9	Arabic, Cyrillic, Greek, and Latin among others	Western Arabic numerals
٠	١	٢	٣	٤	٥	٦	٧	٨	٩	Arabic	Eastern Arabic numerals
۰	۱	۲	۳	۴	۵	۶	۷	۸	۹	Dari/Pashto/Persian	Eastern Arabic numerals
۰	۱	۲	۳	۴	۵	۶	۷	۸	۹	Shahmukhi/Urdu	Eastern Arabic numerals
⠚	⠁	⠃	⠉	⠙	⠑	⠋	⠛	⠓	⠊	Braille	Braille numerals
〇	一	二	三	四	五	六	七	八	九	Chinese/Japanese	Chinese and Japanese numerals
영	일	이	삼	사	오	육	칠	팔	구	Korean	Korean numerals (Sino cardinals) (Note: 6 is 륙 in North Korea.)
𑁦	𑁧	𑁨	𑁩	𑁪	𑁫	𑁬	𑁭	𑁮	𑁯	Brahmi	Brahmi numerals
०	१	२	३	४	५	६	७	८	९	Devanagari	Devanagari numerals
௦	௧	௨	௩	௪	௫	௬	௭	௮	௯	Tamil	Tamil numerals
০	১	২	৩	৪	৫	৬	৭	৮	৯	Eastern Nagari	Bengali numerals
𐴰	𐴱	𐴲	𐴳	𐴴	𐴵	𐴶	𐴷	𐴸	𐴹	Hanifi Rohingya	Hanifi Rohingya script § Numbers
੦	੧	੨	੩	੪	੫	੬	੭	੮	੯	Gurmukhi	Gurmukhi numerals
૦	૧	૨	૩	૪	૫	૬	૭	૮	૯	Gujarati	Gujarati numerals
𑙐	𑙑	𑙒	𑙓	𑙔	𑙕	𑙖	𑙗	𑙘	𑙙	Modi	Modi numerals
𑋰	𑋱	𑋲	𑋳	𑋴	𑋵	𑋶	𑋷	𑋸	𑋹	Khudabadi	Khudabadi script § Numerals
୦	୧	୨	୩	୪	୫	୬	୭	୮	୯	Odia	Odia numerals
᱐	᱑	᱒	᱓	᱔	᱕	᱖	᱗	᱘	᱙	Santali	Santali numerals
𑇐	𑇑	𑇒	𑇓	𑇔	𑇕	𑇖	𑇗	𑇘	𑇙	Sharada	Sharada numerals
౦	౧	౨	౩	౪	౫	౬	౭	౮	౯	Telugu	Telugu script § Numerals
೦	೧	೨	೩	೪	೫	೬	೭	೮	೯	Kannada	Kannada script § Numerals
൦	൧	൨	൩	൪	൫	൬	൭	൮	൯	Malayalam	Malayalam numerals
꯰	꯱	꯲	꯳	꯴	꯵	꯶	꯷	꯸	꯹	Meitei	Meitei script § Numerals
෦	෧	෨	෩	෪	෫	෬	෭	෮	෯	Sinhala	Sinhala numerals
𑓐	𑓑	𑓒	𑓓	𑓔	𑓕	𑓖	𑓗	𑓘	𑓙	Tirhuta Mithilakshar	Maithili numerals
༠	༡	༢	༣	༤	༥	༦	༧	༨	༩	Tibetan	Tibetan numerals
᠐	᠑	᠒	᠓	᠔	᠕	᠖	᠗	᠘	᠙	Mongolian	Mongolian numerals
᥆	᥇	᥈	᥉	᥊	᥋	᥌	᥍	᥎	᥏	Limbu	Limbu script § Digits
၀	၁	၂	၃	၄	၅	၆	၇	၈	၉	Burmese	Burmese numerals
႐	႑	႒	႓	႔	႕	႖	႗	႘	႙	Shan	Shan alphabet § Numerals
០	១	២	៣	៤	៥	៦	៧	៨	៩	Khmer	Khmer numerals
๐	๑	๒	๓	๔	๕	๖	๗	๘	๙	Thai	Thai numerals
໐	໑	໒	໓	໔	໕	໖	໗	໘	໙	Lao	Lao script § Numerals
᪐	᪑	᪒	᪓	᪔	᪕	᪖	᪗	᪘	᪙	Tai Tham	Tai Tham script § Numerals
᧐	᧑/᧚	᧒	᧓	᧔	᧕	᧖	᧗	᧘	᧙	New Tai Lue	New Tai Lue script § Digits
꩐	꩑	꩒	꩓	꩔	꩕	꩖	꩗	꩘	꩙	Cham	Cham script § Numerals
𑽐	𑽑	𑽒	𑽓	𑽔	𑽕	𑽖	𑽗	𑽘	𑽙	Kawi	Kawi script § Digits
꧐	꧑	꧒	꧓	꧔	꧕	꧖	꧗	꧘	꧙	Javanese	Javanese numerals
᭐	᭑	᭒	᭓	᭔	᭕	᭖	᭗	᭘	᭙	Balinese	Balinese numerals
᮰	᮱	᮲	᮳	᮴	᮵	᮶	᮷	᮸	᮹	Sundanese	Sundanese numerals

== History ==
Sometime around 600 CE, a change began in the writing of dates in the Brāhmī-derived scripts of India and Southeast Asia, transforming from an additive system with separate numerals for numbers of different magnitudes to a positional place-value system with a single set of glyphs for 1–9 and a dot for zero, gradually displacing additive expressions of numerals over the following several centuries.

When this system was adopted and extended by medieval Arabs and Persians, they called it al-ḥisāb al-hindī ("Indian arithmetic"). These numerals were gradually adopted in Europe starting around the 10th century, probably transmitted by Arab merchants; medieval and Renaissance European mathematicians generally recognized them as Indian in origin, however a few influential sources credited them to the Arabs, and they eventually came to be generally known as "Arabic numerals" in Europe. According to some sources, this number system may have originated in Chinese Shang numerals (1200 BCE), which was also a decimal positional numeral system.

=== Predecessors ===
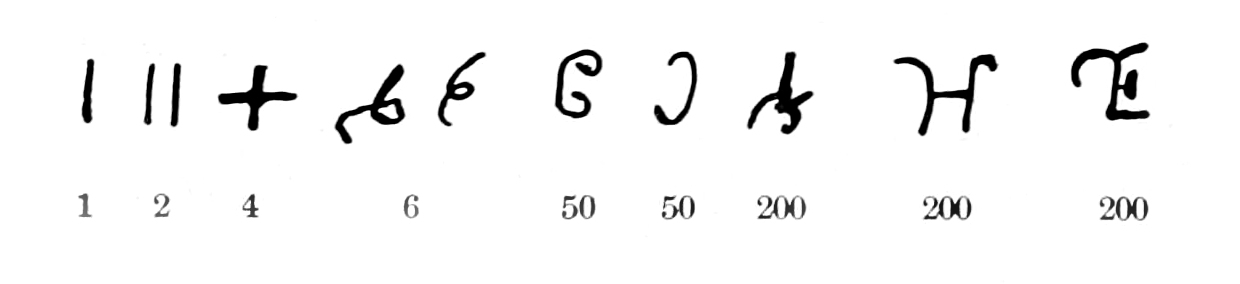
The first Brahmi numerals, ancestors of Hindu-Arabic numerals, used by Ashoka in his Edicts of Ashoka c. 250 BCE

The Brahmi numerals at the basis of the system predate the Common Era. They replaced the earlier Kharosthi numerals used since the 4th century BCE. Brahmi and Kharosthi numerals were used alongside one another in the Maurya Empire period, both appearing on the 3rd century BCE edicts of Ashoka.

Nagari and Devanagari numerals with handwritten variants

Buddhist inscriptions from around 300 BCE use the symbols that became 1, 4, and 6. One century later, their use of the symbols that became 2, 4, 6, 7, and 9 was recorded. These Brahmi numerals are the ancestors of the Hindu–Arabic glyphs 1 to 9, but they were not used as a positional system with a zero, and there were rather separate numerals for each of the tens (10, 20, 30, etc.).

The modern numeral system, including positional notation and use of zero, is in principle independent of the glyphs used, and significantly younger than the Brahmi numerals.

=== Development ===
The place-value system is used in the Bakhshali manuscript, the earliest leaves being radiocarbon dated to the period 224–383 CE. The development of the positional decimal system takes its origins in Indian mathematics during the Gupta period. Around 500, the astronomer Aryabhata uses the word kha ("emptiness") to mark "zero" in tabular arrangements of digits. The 7th century Brahmasphuta Siddhanta contains a comparatively advanced understanding of the mathematical role of zero. The Sanskrit translation of the lost 5th century Prakrit Jaina cosmological text Lokavibhaga may preserve an early instance of the positional use of zero.

The first dated and undisputed inscription showing the use of a symbol for zero appears on a stone inscription found at the Chaturbhuja Temple at Gwalior in India, dated 876 CE.

==== Medieval Islamic world ====
These Indian developments were taken up in Islamic mathematics in the 8th century, as recorded in al-Qifti's Chronology of the scholars (early 13th century).

In 10th century Islamic mathematics, the system was extended to include fractions, as recorded in a treatise by Abbasid Caliphate mathematician Abu'l-Hasan al-Uqlidisi, who was the first to describe positional decimal fractions. According to J. L. Berggren, the Muslims were the first to represent numbers as we do since they were the ones who initially extended this system of numeration to represent parts of the unit by decimal fractions, something that the Hindus did not accomplish. Thus, the system is accurately described as "Hindu–Arabic".

The numeral system came to be known to both the Persian mathematician Khwarizmi, who wrote a book, On the Calculation with Hindu Numerals in about 825 CE, and the Arab mathematician Al-Kindi, who wrote a book, On the Use of the Hindu Numerals (كتاب في استعمال العداد الهندي [kitāb fī isti'māl al-'adād al-hindī]) around 830 CE. Persian scientist Kushyar Gilani, who wrote Kitab fi usul hisab al-hind (Principles of Hindu Reckoning) is one of the oldest surviving manuscripts using the Hindu numerals. These books are principally responsible for the diffusion of the Hindu system of numeration throughout the Islamic world, and ultimately also to Europe.

=== Adoption in Europe ===
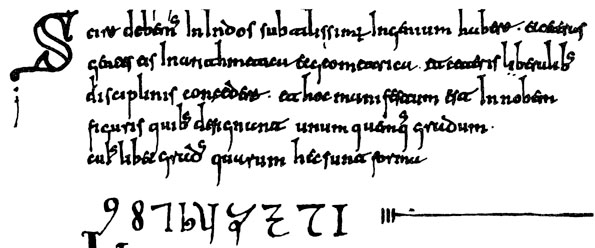
The Arabic numeral system first appeared in Europe in the Spanish Codex Vigilanus, year 976.

In Christian Europe, the first mention and representation of Hindu–Arabic numerals (from one to nine, without zero), is in the Codex Vigilanus (aka Albeldensis), an illuminated compilation of various historical documents from the Visigothic period in Spain, written in the year 976 CE by three monks of the Riojan monastery of San Martín de Albelda. Between 967 and 969 CE, Gerbert of Aurillac discovered and studied Arab science in the Catalan abbeys. Later he obtained from these places the book De multiplicatione et divisione (On Multiplication and Division). After becoming Pope Sylvester II in the year 999 CE, he introduced a new model of abacus, the so-called Abacus of Gerbert, by adopting tokens representing Hindu–Arabic numerals, from one to nine.

Leonardo Fibonacci brought this system to Europe. His book Liber Abaci introduced Modus Indorum (the method of the Indians), today known as Hindu–Arabic numeral system or base-10 positional notation, the use of zero, and the decimal place system to the Latin world. The numeral system came to be called "Arabic" by the Europeans. It was used in European mathematics from the 12th century, and entered common use from the 15th century to replace Roman numerals.

The familiar shape of the Western Arabic glyphs as now used with the Latin alphabet (0, 1, 2, 3, 4, 5, 6, 7, 8, 9) are the product of the late 15th to early 16th century, when they entered early typesetting. Muslim scientists used the Babylonian numeral system, and merchants used the Abjad numerals, a system similar to the Greek numeral system and the Hebrew numeral system. Similarly, Fibonacci's introduction of the system to Europe was restricted to learned circles. The credit for first establishing widespread understanding and usage of the decimal positional notation among the general population goes to Adam Ries, an author of the German Renaissance, whose 1522 Rechenung auff der linihen und federn (Calculating on the Lines and with a Quill) was targeted at the apprentices of businessmen and craftsmen.

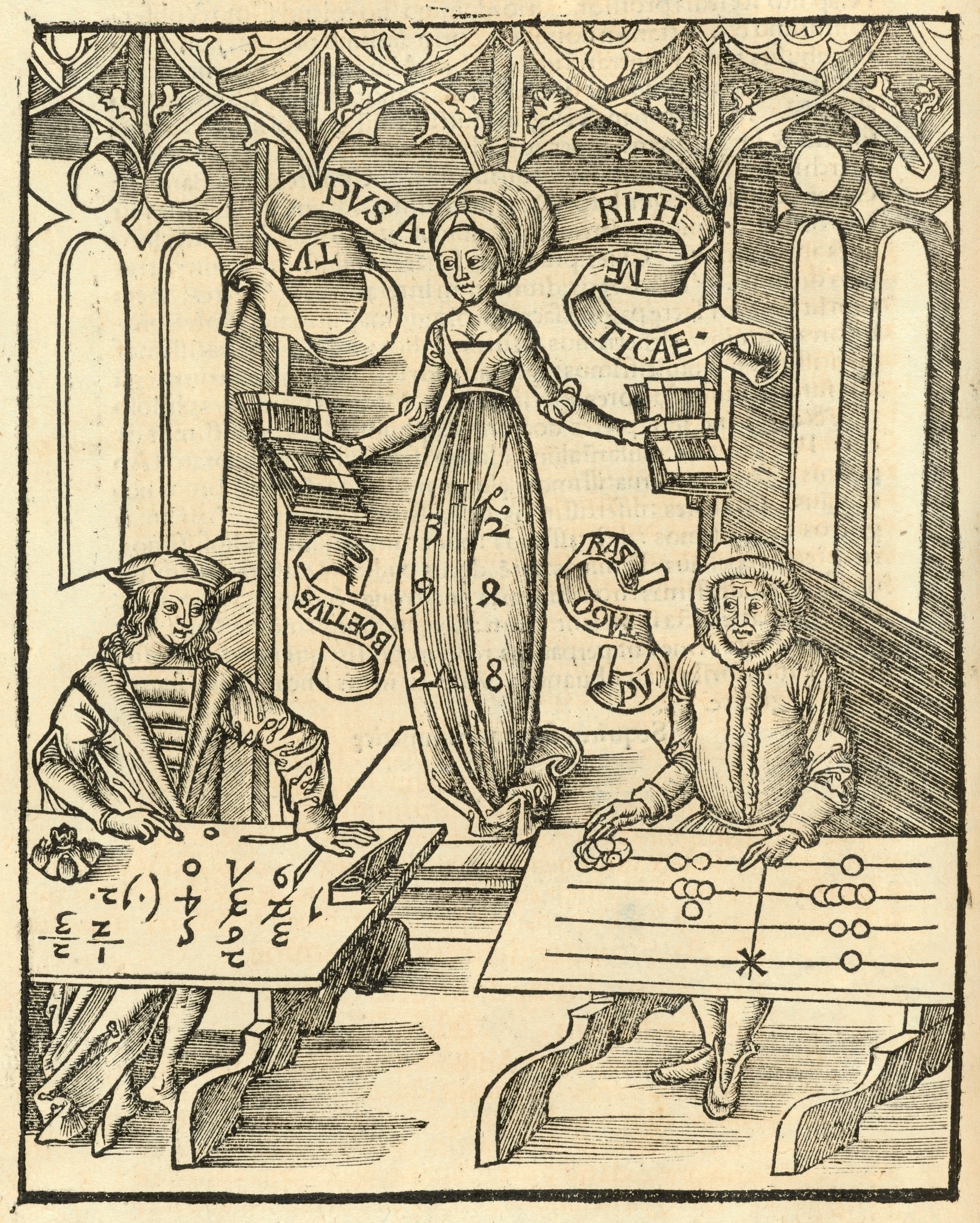
Gregor Reisch, Madame Arithmatica, 1503

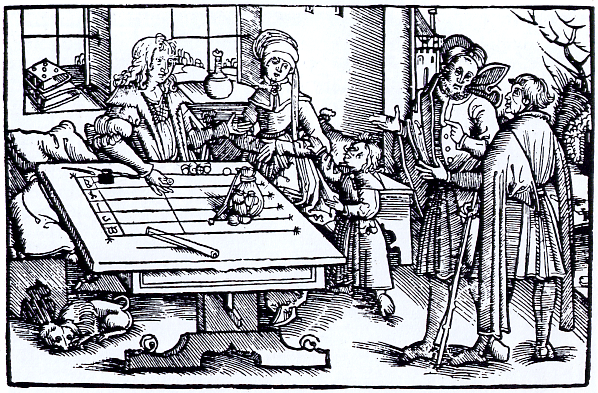
A calculation table, used for arithmetic using Roman numerals

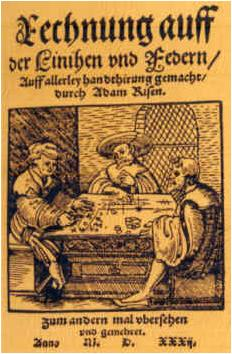
Adam Ries, Rechenung auff der linihen und federn, 1522

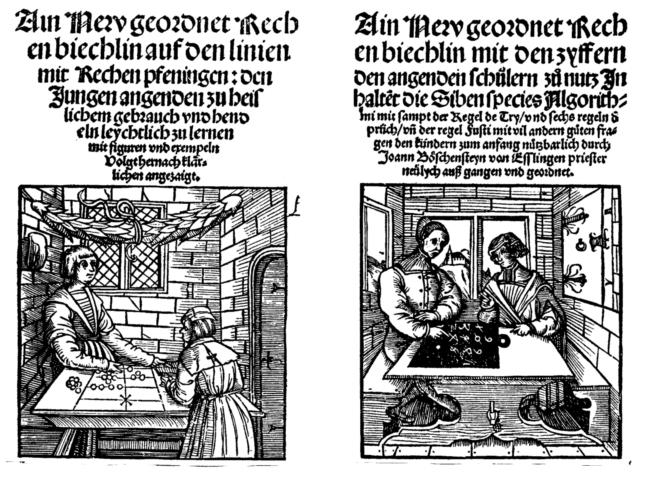
Two arithmetic books published in 1514 – Köbel (left) using a calculation table and Böschenteyn using numerals

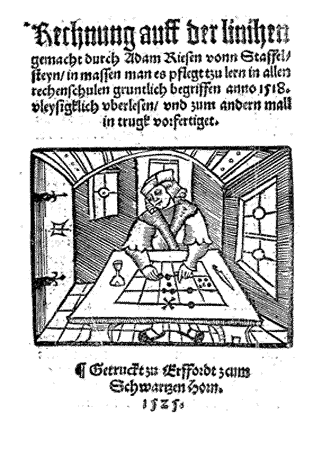
Adam Ries, Rechenung auff der linihen und federn (2nd Ed.), 1525

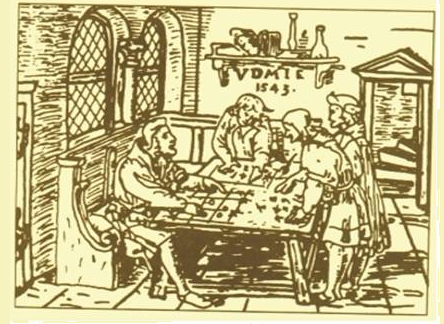
Robert Recorde, The ground of artes, 1543

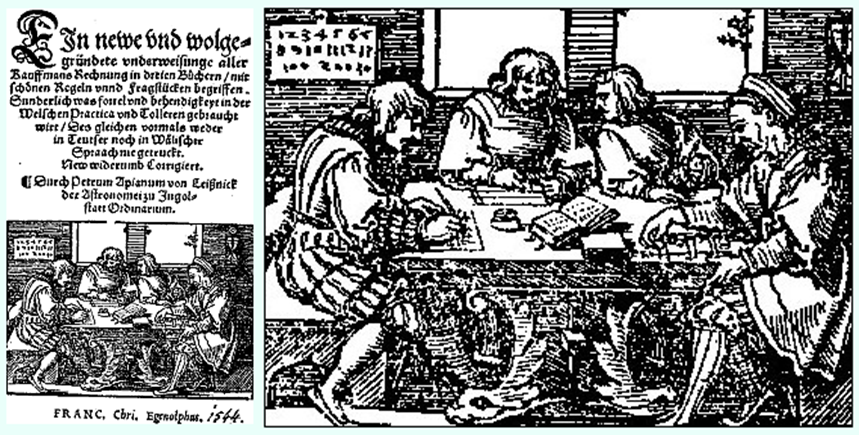
Peter Apian, Kaufmanns Rechnung, 1527

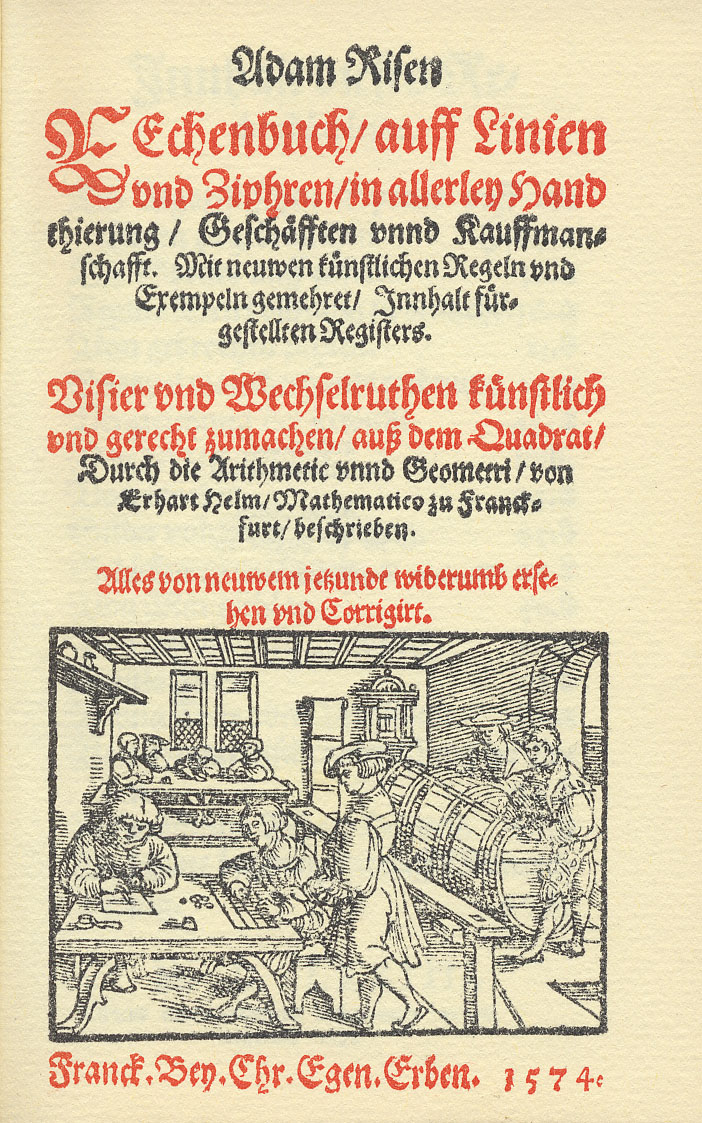
Adam Ries, Rechenung auff der linihen und federn (2nd Ed.), 1525

=== Adoption in East Asia ===
The '〇' is used to write zero in Suzhou numerals, which is the only surviving variation of the rod numeral system. The Mathematical Treatise in Nine Sections, written by Qin Jiushao in 1247, is the oldest surviving Chinese mathematical text to use the character ‘〇’ for zero.

The origin of using the character '〇' to represent zero is unknown. Gautama Siddha introduced Hindu numerals with zero in 718 CE, but Chinese mathematicians did not find them useful, as they already had the decimal positional counting rods. Some historians suggest that the use of '〇' for zero was influenced by Indian numerals imported by Gautama, but Gautama’s numeral system represented zero with a dot rather than a hollow circle, similar to the Bakhshali manuscript.

An alternative hypothesis proposes that the use of '〇' to represent zero arose from a modification of the Chinese text space filler "□", making its resemblance to Indian numeral systems purely coincidental. Others think that the Indians acquired the symbol '〇' from China, because it resembles a Confucian philosophical symbol for "nothing".

Chinese and Japanese adopted the Hindu–Arabic numerals in the 19th century, abandoning counting rods.

=== Spread of the Western Arabic variant ===
The "Western Arabic" numerals as they were in common use in Europe since the Baroque period have secondarily found worldwide use together with the Latin alphabet, and even significantly beyond the contemporary spread of the Latin alphabet, intruding into the writing systems in regions where other variants of the Hindu–Arabic numerals had been in use, but also in conjunction with Chinese and Japanese writing (see Chinese numerals, Japanese numerals).

== See also ==
- History of mathematics
- List of books on history of number systems
- Numeral system

== Bibliography ==
- Chrisomalis, Stephen (2010). Numerical Notation: A Comparative History. Cambridge University Press. ISBN 978-0-521-87818-0.
- Flegg, Graham (1984). Numbers: Their History and Meaning. Penguin. ISBN 978-0-14-022564-8.
- O'Connor, John J.; Robertson, Edmund F. (2000). "Indian numerals". MacTutor History of Mathematics Archive. University of St Andrews.
- O'Connor, John J.; Robertson, Edmund F. (2001). "The Arabic numeral system". MacTutor History of Mathematics Archive. University of St Andrews.
- Smith, David Eugene; Karpinski, Louis Charles (1911). The Hindu–Arabic Numerals. Boston; London: Ginn and Company, Publishers. OCLC 1045941557.
