= Arabic numerals (disambiguation) =

Arabic numerals are the ten symbols 0, 1, 2, 3, 4, 5, 6, 7, 8, 9, which, in the 21st century, are the most popular digits in the world.

Arabic numerals may also refer to:

- Hindu–Arabic numeral system, a positional base-10 numeral system, nowadays the most common representation of numbers
- Decimal, the Hindu–Arabic system expanded to support non-integers
- Eastern Arabic numerals (٠,١,٢,٣,٤,٥,٦,٧,٨,٩), symbols used to write decimal in the countries of the Arab east, and in other countries
- Numerals (number names) in Arabic language; see Arabic grammar § Numerals
- Abjad numerals, a numeral system in which the 28 letters of the Arabic alphabet are assigned numerical values and may be used in ordered lists
