= Gwalior inscription =

Gwalior inscription may refer to these inscriptions found in Gwalior Fort, India:

- Gwalior inscription of Mihirakula, a 6th-century poetic Sanskrit inscription in the Gupta script recording the construction of a stone temple for the Hindu deity Surya
- Gwalior inscription at Chaturbhuj Temple, Gwalior, a 9th-century Sanskrit inscription with the first known occurrence of the "0" symbol
