= Gujarati numerals =

Number system of the Gujarati script of South Asia

Gujarati numerals is the numeral system of the Gujarati script of South Asia, which is a derivative of Devanagari numerals. It is the official numeral system of Gujarat, India. It is also officially recognized in India and as a minor script in Pakistan.

== Digits ==
The following table shows Gujarati digits and the Gujarati word for each of them in various scripts.

Gujarati numeral	Western Arabic numeral	Devanagari numeral	Gujarati word	IAST Romanisation	Devanagari
૦	0	०	શૂન્ય	shūnya	शून्य
૧	1	१	એક	ēk(a)	एक
૨	2	२	બે	bē	बे
૩	3	३	ત્રણ	traṇ(a)	त्रण
૪	4	४	ચાર	chār(a)	चार
૫	5	५	પાંચ	pāṁc(a)	पांच
૬	6	६	છ	cha	छ
૭	7	७	સાત	sāt(a)	सात
૮	8	८	આઠ	āṭh(a)	आठ
૯	9	९	નવ	nav(a)	नव

== Larger numbers ==
Digits are combined to represent numbers larger than 9 as per the standard positional decimal rules.

Gujarati	Western Arabic	Devanagari	Gujarati word	Romanization of Gujarati word	Devanagari
૧૦	10	१०	દસ	das	दस
૧૧	11	११	અગિયાર	agiyār	ग्यारह
૧૨	12	१२	બાર	bār	बारह
૧૩	13	१३	તેર	tēr	तेरह
૧૪	14	१४	ચૌદ	chaud	चौदह
૧૫	15	१५	પંદર	pandar	पंद्रह
૧૬	16	१६	સોળ	soļ	सोलह
૧૭	17	१७	સત્તર	sattar	सत्रह
૧૮	18	१८	અઢાર	aḑhār	अठारह
૧૯	19	१९	ઓગણિસ	ogaņis	उन्नीस
૨૦	20	२०	વીસ	vīs	बीस
૧૦૦	100	१००	સો	sō	सौ
૧,૦૦૦	1,000	१,०००	હજાર	hajār	हज़ार
૧૦,૦૦૦	10,000	१०,०००	દસ હજાર	das hajār	दस हज़ार
૧,૦૦,૦૦૦	100,000	१,००,०००	લાખ	lākh	लाख
૧०,૦૦,૦૦૦	1,000,000	१०,००,०००	દસ લાખ	das lākh	दस लाख
૧,૦૦,૦૦,૦૦૦	10,000,000	१,००,००,०००	કરોડ	karōṛ	करोड़

== See also ==
- Gujarati script
- Gurmukhi numerals
