= Tibetan numerals =

Numeral system of the Tibetan script

Tibetan numerals is the numeral system of the Tibetan script and a variety of the Hindu–Arabic numeral system. It is used in the Tibetan language and has a base-10 counting system. The Mongolian numerals were also developed from the Tibetan numerals.

== Cardinal numbers ==
Arabic numeral	Tibetan numeral	Tibetan word	Romanisation
0	༠	ཀླད་ཀོར་	laykor
1	༡	གཅིག་	chigk [t͡ɕi˥˩]
2	༢	གཉིས་	nyi [ȵiː˥]
3	༣	གསུམ་	sum [sum˥]
4	༤	བཞི་	shi [ɕi˩˧]
5	༥	ལྔ་	nga [ŋa˥]
6	༦	དྲུག་	trug [ʈ͡ʂʰu˩˧˨]
7	༧	བདུན་	dün [tỹ˩˧]
8	༨	བརྒྱད་	gyay [cɛː˩˧˨]
9	༩	དགུ་	gu [ku˩˧]

=== Extended numbers ===
Arabic numeral	Tibetan numeral	Tibetan word	Romanisation
10	༡༠	བཅུ་	chu
11	༡༡	བཅུ་གཅིག་	chu chigk
12	༡༢	བཅུ་གཉིས་	chu nyi
13	༡༣	བཅུ་གསུམ་	chuk sum
14	༡༤	བཅུ་བཞི་	chu shi
15	༡༥	བཅོ་ལྔ་	cho nga
16	༡༦	བཅུ་དྲུག་	chu druk
17	༡༧	བཅུ་བདུན་	chup dün
18	༡༨	བཅོ་བརྒྱད	cho gyay
19	༡༩	བཅུ་དགུ་	chu gu
20	༢༠	ཉི་ཤུ་	nyi shu
21	༢༡	ཉི་ཤུ་རྩ་གཅིག	nyi shu tsa chigk
30	༣༠	སུམ་ཅུ	sum ju
31	༣༡	སུམ་བུ་སོ་གཅིག	sum ju so chigk
40	༤༠	བཞི་བཅུ	ship ju
41	༤༡	བཞི་བཅུ་ཞེ་གཅིག	ship ju shey chigk
50	༥༠	ལྔ་བཅུ	ngap ju
51	༥༡	ལྔ་བཅུ་ང་གཅིག	ngap ju nga chigk
60	༦༠	དྲུག་ཅུ	trug chu
61	༦༡	དྲུག་ཅུ་རེ་གཅིག	trug chu rey chigk
70	༧༠	བདུན་ཅུ	dün ju
71	༧༡	བདུན་ཅུ་དོན་གཅིག	dün ju dön chigk
80	༨༠	བརྒྱད་ཅུ	gyay ju
81	༨༡	བརྒྱད་ཅུ་གྱ་གཅིག	gyay ju gya chigk
90	༩༠	དགུ་བཅུ	gup ju
91	༩༡	དགུ་བཅུ་གོ་གཅིག	gup ju go chigk
100	༡༠༠	བརྒྱ་	gya
282	༢༨༢	ཉིས་བརྒྱ་དང་བརྒྱད་ཅུ་གྱ་གཉིས	nyi gya dang gyay ju gya nyi
1,000	༡༠༠༠	སྟོང་	tong
3,047	༣༠༤༧	སུམ་སྟོང་བརྒྱ་མེད་དང་བཞི་བཅུ་ཞེ་བདུན	sum tong gya mey dang ship ju shey dün
10,000	༡༠༠༠༠	ཁྲི་	thri
1,000,000	༡༠༠༠༠༠༠	ས་ཡ་	sa ya
10,000,000	༡༠༠༠༠༠༠༠	བྱེ་བ་	che wa
100,000,000	༡༠༠༠༠༠༠༠༠	དུང་ཕྱུར་	dung chur
1,000,000,000	༡༠༠༠༠༠༠༠༠༠	ཐེར་འབུམ་	ther pum
10,000,000,000	༡༠༠༠༠༠༠༠༠༠༠	ཐེར་འབུམ་ཆེན་པོ་	ther pum chen po
100,000,000,000	༡༠༠༠༠༠༠༠༠༠༠༠	ཁྲག་ཁྲིག་	thrag trig
1,000,000,000,000	༡༠༠༠༠༠༠༠༠༠༠༠༠	ཁྲག་ཁྲིག་ཆེན་པོ་	thrag trig chen po

Tibetan numbers greater than 20 use a numerical interfix to connect the first and second digit. These particles are unique for each set of 10: རྩ for 21-29, སོ for 31-39 , ཞེ for 41-49 , ང for 51-59 , རེ for 61-69 , དོན for 71-79, གྱ for 81-89, and གོ for 91-99. In written Tibetan, ཉེར may be used in place of རྩ. Since each particle corresponds to a unique value of ten, the interfix can be used in place of using the full name of the second digit (e.g. སོ་གཉིས for 32 instead of སུམ་བཅུ་སོ་གཉིས). Interfixes are not used for numbers that end in 0. Additionally, one may emphasize that a number ends in zero by appending ཐམ་པ to the end (e.g. བཞི་བཅུ་ཐམ་པ, བརྒྱ་ཐམ་པ). Numbers in the third digit are separated from second or first digit using the particle དང when written and ར when spoken (e.g ཉིས་བརྒྱ་དང་བརྒྱད་ཅུ་གྱ་གཉིས or ཉིས་བརྒྱ་ར་བརྒྱད་ཅུ་གྱ་གཉིས for 282). If the third digit is zero in a four digit or larger number, this is represented with the phrase བརྒྱ་མེད, literally "without hundred" (e.g. ཉིས་སྟོང་བརྒྱ་མེད་དང་ཉི་ཤུ་ཉེར་ལྔ).

== Ordinals ==
Arabic numeral	Tibetan numeral	Tibetan ordinal word	Romanisation
1	༡	དང་པོ་	dang po [tʰaŋ˩˧ko˥]
2	༢	གཉིས་པ་	nyi pa
3	༣	གསུམ་པ་	sum pa
4	༤	བཞི་པ་	shi pa
5	༥	ལྔ་པ་	nga pa
6	༦	དྲུག་པ་	trug pa
7	༧	བདུན་པ་	dün pa
8	༨	བརྒྱད་པ་	gyay pa
9	༩	དགུ་པ་	gu pa
10	༡༠	བཅུ་པ་	chu pa

== Fractions ==
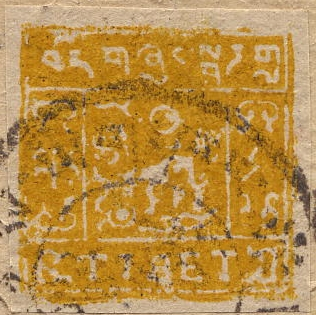
7½-skar postage stamp, the evidence for the ༱ symbol being used for 7.5.

Several slashed forms of Tibetan numerals are included in Unicode to represent fractions. However, their exact meaning and authenticity are unclear.

Tibetan fractions	༳	༪	༫	༬	༭	༮	༯	༰	༱	༲
Values	-0.5	0.5	1.5	2.5	3.5	4.5	5.5	6.5	7.5	8.5

== See also ==
- Tibetan script
