= Javanese numerals =

Set of numerals used in javanese script

Javanese numerals (Javanese: ꦮꦶꦭꦁꦔꦤ꧀ꦗꦮ, romanized: Wilangan Jawa; Old Javanese: 𑼮𑼶𑼭𑼁, romanized: wilaṁ) are a set of numerals traditionally used in the Javanese language, although Arabic numerals are also used. Javanese numerals follow the Hindu–Arabic numeral system commonly used in the rest of the world.

Javanese is rich in numerical expressions. What is written here is the form in standard written Javanese. Spoken Javanese or dialects can take different forms.

== Numerals ==
=== Basic numerals ===
The numerals 0–9 have independent and modifier forms. The modifiers are used to form powers of 10 or modify the sum of objects. In some cases, there is more than one word for a numeral reflecting the Javanese register system of ngoko (low-register) and krama (high-register), as well as words from a literary form of Javanese called kawi and derived from Old Javanese.

| Numeral | | Independent | | | Modifier | |
| Javanese | Latin | Ngoko | Krama | Kawi | Ngoko | Krama |
|---|---|---|---|---|---|---|
| ꧐ | 0 | ꦢꦱ꧀, das | - | - | - | - |
| ꧑ | 1 | ꦱꦶꦗꦶ, siji | ꦱꦠꦸꦁꦒꦭ꧀, satunggal | ꦲꦺꦏ, éka | ꦱ, sa- | - |
| ꧒ | 2 | ꦭꦺꦴꦫꦺꦴ, loro | ꦏꦭꦶꦃ, kalih | ꦢ꧀ꦮꦶ, dwi | ꦫꦺꦴꦁ, rong | ꦏꦭꦶꦃ, kalih |
| ꧓ | 3 | ꦠꦼꦭꦸ, telu | ꦠꦶꦒ, tiga | ꦠꦿꦶ, tri; ꦠꦿꦶꦤꦶ, trini | ꦠꦼꦭꦸꦁ, telung | ꦠꦶꦒꦁ, tigang |
| ꧔ | 4 | ꦥꦥꦠ꧀, papat | ꦱꦼꦏꦮꦤ꧀, sekawan | ꦕꦠꦸꦂ, catur | ꦥꦠꦁ, patang | ꦱꦼꦏꦮꦤ꧀, sekawan |
| ꧕ | 5 | ꦭꦶꦩ, lima | ꦒꦁꦱꦭ꧀, gangsal | ꦥꦚ꧀ꦕ, panca | ꦭꦶꦩꦁ, limang | ꦒꦁꦱꦭ꧀, gangsal |
| ꧖ | 6 | ꦤꦼꦩ꧀, nem | - | ꦱꦢ꧀, sad | ꦤꦼꦩ꧀, nem | - |
| ꧗ | 7 | ꦥꦶꦠꦸ, pitu | - | ꦱꦥ꧀ꦠ, sapta | ꦥꦶꦠꦸꦁ, pitung | - |
| ꧘ | 8 | ꦮꦺꦴꦭꦸ, wolu | - | ꦲꦱ꧀ꦛ, astha | ꦮꦺꦴꦭꦸꦁ, wolung | - |
| ꧙ | 9 | ꦱꦔ, sanga | - | ꦤꦮ, nawa | ꦱꦔꦁ, sangang | - |

=== Teen, tween, and thirty numerals ===
Like English, Javanese has compound forms for the teens; however, it also has a series of compound 'tweens', 21–29. The teens are based on a root wĕlas and the tweens on likur.

Especially for numerals between 30 and 40, there are two formats: proper form and shortened form (wancahan).

| Numeral | Teen | | Numeral | Tween | | Numeral | Thirty | |
| Numeral | Ngoko | Krama | Numeral | Ngoko | Krama | Numeral | Proper | Shortened |
|---|---|---|---|---|---|---|---|---|
| 11 | sawĕlas | - | 21 | salikur | - | 31 | tĕlung puluh siji | beh-ji |
| 12 | ro wĕlas | kalih wĕlas | 22 | ro likur | kalih likur | 32 | tĕlung puluh (lo)ro | beh-ro |
| 13 | tĕlu wĕlas | tiga wĕlas | 23 | tĕlu likur | tiga likur | 33 | tĕlung puluh tĕlu | beh-lu |
| 14 | pat wĕlas | sakawan wĕlas | 24 | pat likur | sakawan likur | 34 | tĕlung puluh (pa)pat | beh-pat |
| 15 | lima wĕlas | gangsal wĕlas | 25 | salawe | salangkung | 35 | salapan | beh-ma |
| 16 | ĕnĕm wĕlas | - | 26 | ĕnĕm likur | - | 36 | tĕlung puluh ĕnĕm | beh-nĕm |
| 17 | pitu wĕlas | - | 27 | pitu likur | - | 37 | tĕlung puluh pitu | beh-tu |
| 18 | wolu wĕlas | - | 28 | wolu likur | - | 38 | tĕlung puluh wolu | beh-wo |
| 19 | sanga wĕlas | - | 29 | sanga likur | - | 39 | tĕlung puluh sanga | beh-nga |

=== Powers of 10 ===
When basic numbers are combined with powers of 10, the modifier is applied. The table below uses the modifier of one (sa-) as an example.

| Power notation | Name | | International notation (Note: Use of separator in digit grouping here follows customs in most English-speaking countries. For international standards and details, see decimal mark.) | Short scale Western (long scale Western) |
| Power notation | Javanese | Latin | International notation | Short scale Western (long scale Western) |
|---|---|---|---|---|
| 10^{0} | ꦱꦶꦗꦶ | siji | 1 | One |
| 10^{1} | ꦱꦥꦸꦭꦸꦃ | sapuluh | 10 | TenSI prefix: deca- |
| 10^{2} | ꦱꦲꦠꦸꦱ꧀ | saatus | 100 | One hundred SI prefix: hecto- |
| 10^{3} | ꦱꦲꦶꦮꦸ | saiwu | 1,000 | One thousand SI prefix: kilo- |
| 10^{4} | ꦱꦊꦏ꧀ꦱ | salĕksa | 10,000 | Ten thousand |
| 10^{5} | ꦱꦏꦼꦛꦶ | sakĕthi | 100,000 | One hundred thousand |
| 10^{6} | ꦱꦪꦸꦠ | sayuta | 1,000,000 | One million SI prefix: mega- |
| 10^{7} | ꦱꦮꦼꦤ꧀ꦢꦿ | sawĕndra | 10,000,000 | Ten million |
| 10^{8} | ꦱꦧꦫ | sabara | 100,000,000 | One hundred million |
| 10^{9} | ꦱꦒꦸꦭ꧀ꦩ | sagulma | 1,000,000,000 | One billion (one milliard) SI prefix: giga- |
| 10^{10} | ꦱꦕꦩꦸ | sacamu | 10,000,000,000 | Ten billion (ten milliard) |
| 10^{11} | ꦱꦮꦸꦂꦝ | sawurdha | 100,000,000,000 | One hundred billion (one hundred milliard) |
| 10^{12} | ꦱꦏꦶꦂꦤ | sakirna | 1,000,000,000,000 | One trillion (one billion) SI prefix: tera- |
| 10^{13} | ꦱꦥꦸꦭꦸꦃꦏꦶꦂꦤ | sapuluh kirna | 10,000,000,000,000 | Ten trillion (ten billion) |
| 10^{14} | ꦱꦲꦠꦸꦱ꧀ꦏꦶꦂꦤ | saatus kirna | 100,000,000,000,000 | One hundred trillion (one hundred billion) |
| 10^{15} | ꦱꦠꦸꦠ꧀ꦱ꧀ꦩ | satutsma | 1,000,000,000,000,000 | One quadrillion (one billiard) SI prefix: peta- |
| 10^{16} | ꦱꦥꦸꦭꦸꦃꦠꦸꦠ꧀ꦱ꧀ꦩ | sapuluh tutsma | 10,000,000,000,000,000 | Ten quadrillion (ten billiard) |
| 10^{17} | ꦱꦲꦠꦸꦱ꧀ꦠꦸꦠ꧀ꦱ꧀ꦩ | saatus tutsma | 100,000,000,000,000,000 | One hundred quadrillion (one hundred billiard) |
| 10^{18} | ꦱꦠꦒ | sataga | 1,000,000,000,000,000,000 | One quintillion (one trillion) SI prefix: exa- |

=== "Minus half" numerals ===
There are 3 words that mean "minus half of" some number. Tĕngah means minus half of 1, sasur means minus half of 10, and bĕlah means minus half of 100.

The format is ka- + basic numeral + minus half numeral. The basic numeral’s place value is decided by the minus half numeral, so the lima ("five") in kalima tĕngah (4 1/2) means five, while the lima in kalima sasur (45) means fifty.

For place values over 100, compounds containing bĕlah are used. Minus half of 1000 is bĕlah iwu. Minus half of 10,000 is bĕlah lĕksa.

| Tĕngah | | Sasur | | Bĕlah | |
| Arabic Numeral | Javanese Name | Arabic Numeral | Javanese Name | Arabic Numeral | Javanese Name |
|---|---|---|---|---|---|
| 1/2 | satĕngah | 35 | kapat sasur | 150 | karo bĕlah |
| 1 1/2 | karo tĕngah | 45 | kalima sasur | 250 | katĕlu bĕlah |
| 2 1/2 | katĕlu tĕngah | 55 | kaĕnĕm sasur | 350 | kapat bĕlah |
| 3 1/2 | kapat tĕngah | 65 | kapitu sasur | 450 | kalima bĕlah |
| 4 1/2 | kalima tĕngah | 75 | kawolu sasur | 550 | kaĕnĕm bĕlah |
| 5 1/2 | kaĕnĕm tĕngah | 85 | kasanga sasur | 650 | kapitu bĕlah |
| 6 1/2 | kapitu tĕngah | 95 | kasapuluh sasur | 750 | kawolu bĕlah |
| 7 1/2 | kawolu tĕngah | | | 850 | kasanga bĕlah |
| 8 1/2 | kasanga tĕngah | | | 950 | kasapuluh bĕlah |
| 9 1/2 | kasapuluh tĕngah | | | 1,500 | karo bĕlah iwu |
| 99 1/2 | kasaatus tĕngah | | | 45,000 | kapat bĕlah lĕksa |
and so on...

Sasur is only used for thirty and above.

=== Fractions ===
Fractions are made up of numerator (modifier form) + pra- + denominator. Below is the example:

| Numeral | Numerator | Denominator | Name |
|---|---|---|---|
| 3/4 | tĕlu | pat | tĕlung prapat |
| 1/3 | siji | tĕlu | sapratĕlu |
| 4/5 | pat | lima | patang pralima |

=== Special numerals ===
There are several forms of numbering that do not follow the pattern above. These special numerals can be combined with the powers of 10.

| Numeral | Name | |
| Numeral | Ngoko | Krama |
|---|---|---|
| 25 | salawe | salangkung |
| 35 | salapan | - |
| 50 | saikĕt | - |
| 60 | sawidak | - |
| 75 | tĕlung lawe | - |
| 400 | samas | - |
| 800 | dhomas | - |

== Examples ==
| Numeral | Javanese | English | |
| Numeral | Javanese | Literal | Transcription |
|---|---|---|---|
| 351 1/2 | Kapat bĕlah karo tĕngah | Four hundred minus fifty and two minus one-half | Three hundred fifty-one and a half |
| 500,075 | Limang kĕthi kawolu sasur | Five kĕthi and eighty minus five | Five hundred thousand and seventy five |
| 123,456,789 | Sabahara rong wĕndra tĕlung yuta kalima belah kĕthi ĕnĕm iwu pitung atus wolung puluh sanga | One bahara two wĕndra three million five hundred minus fifty thousand and six thousand seven hundred eighty-nine | One hundred and twenty-three million four hundred and fifty-six thousand seven hundred and eighty-nine |
| 17,000,000,000 | Sacamu pitung gulma | One camu seven gulma | Seventeen billion (short scale) |
| 6,789,000,000,000,000 | Ĕnĕm tutsma pitung atus wolung puluh sanga kirna | Six tutsma seven hundred eighty nine kirna | Six quadrillion seven hundred and eighty-nine trillion |

== Old Javanese numerals ==
Old Javanese numerals have two sets of names: native names (from Austronesian) and loan names (from Sanskrit).

| Old Javanese | Western Arabic | Old Javanese | |
| Old Javanese | Western Arabic | Native | Sanskrit |
|---|---|---|---|
| 𑽐 | 0 | - | śūnya (𑼯𑼹𑼥𑽂𑼫) |
| 𑽑 | 1 | siji (𑼱𑼶𑼙𑼶) | eka (𑼎𑼒𑼃) |
| 𑽒 | 2 | rwa (𑼬𑽂𑼮) ro (𑼬𑼾𑼴) | dwi (𑼣𑽂𑼮𑼶) |
| 𑽓 | 3 | tĕlu (𑼡𑽀𑼭𑼸) tiga (𑼡𑼶𑼔) | tri (𑼡𑽂𑼬𑼶𑼠𑼶) |
| 𑽔 | 4 | pat (𑼦𑼡𑽁) pāt (𑼦𑼵𑼡𑽁) | catur (𑼗𑼡𑽂𑼮𑼴𑼬𑼷) |
| 𑽕 | 5 | lima (𑼭𑼶𑼪) gaṅsal (𑼔𑼁𑼱𑼭𑽁) | pañca (𑼦𑼛𑽂𑼗) |
| 𑽖 | 6 | nĕm (𑼥𑽀𑼪𑽁) | ṣaṭ (𑼰𑼜𑽁) |
| 𑽗 | 7 | pitu (𑼦𑼶𑼡𑼸) | sapta (𑼱𑼦𑽂𑼡) |
| 𑽘 | 8 | wwalu (𑼮𑽂𑼮𑼭𑼸) wolu (𑼮𑼾𑼵𑼭𑼸) dwalapan (𑼣𑽂𑼮𑼭𑼦𑼥𑽁) | aṣṭa (𑼄𑼰𑽂𑼜) |
| 𑽙 | 9 | saṅa (𑼱𑼖) salapan (𑼱𑼭𑼦𑼥𑽁) | nawa (𑼥𑼮) |
| 𑽑𑽐 | 10 | sapuluh (𑼱𑼦𑼸𑼭𑼸𑼃) | daśa (𑼣𑼯) |

The word śūnya for zero was calqued into Arabic as صفر sifr, meaning 'nothing', which became the term "zero" in many European languages via Medieval Latin zephirum.

== See also ==
- Balinese numerals, a related but yet more complex numeral system.
