= Mongolian numerals =

Numerals used in Mongolian scripts

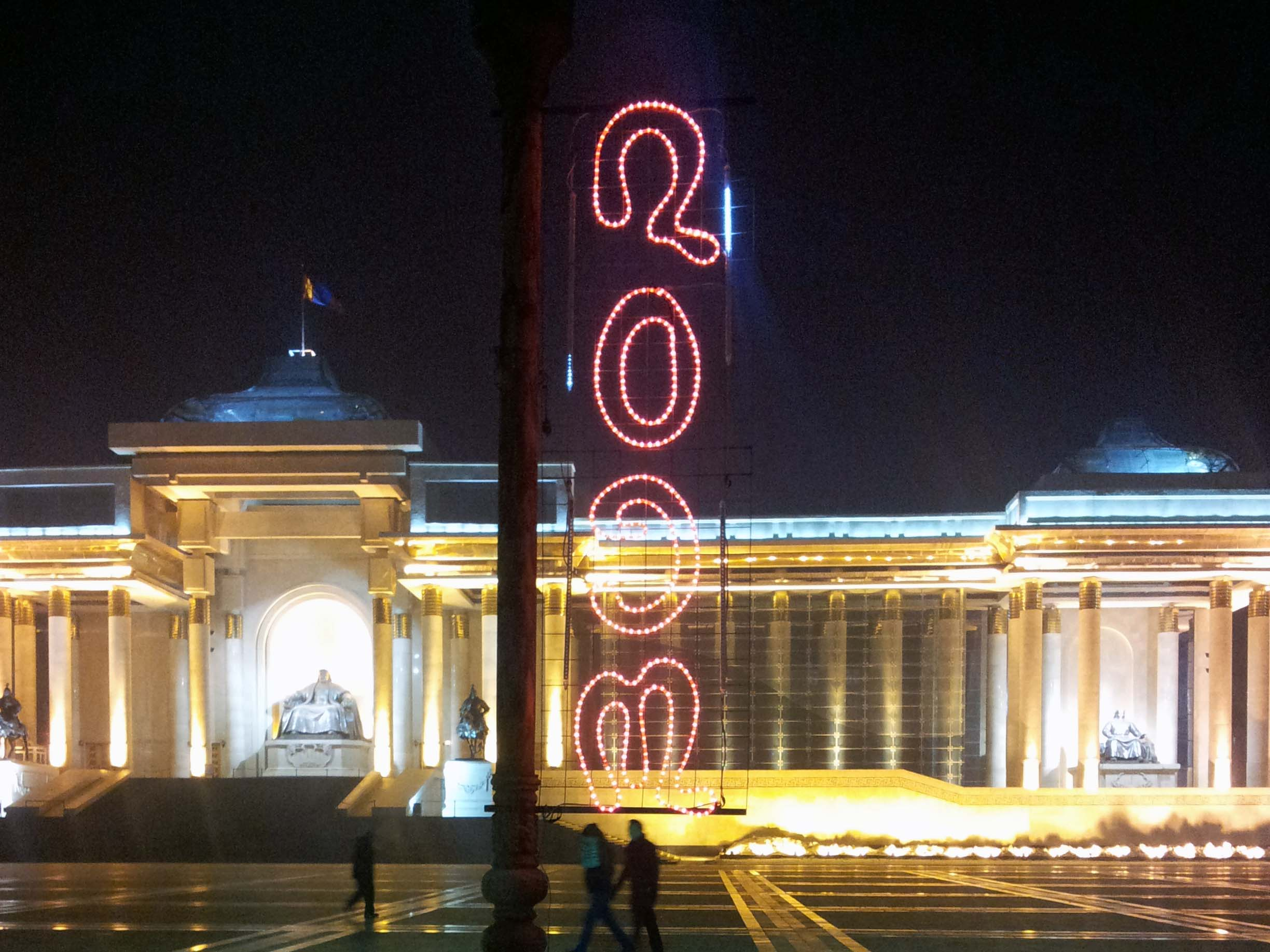
Numerals reading "2013" in Ulaanbaatar

Example use of the number 16 on the first line of John 3:16

Mongolian numerals are numerals developed from Tibetan numerals and used in conjunction with the Mongolian and Clear script. They are still used on Mongolian tögrög banknotes.

The main sources of reference for Mongolian numerals are mathematical and philosophical works of Janj khutugtu A.Rolbiidorj (1717-1766) and D.Injinaash (1704-1788). Rolbiidorj exercises with numerals of up to 10^{66}, the last number which he called “setgeshgui” or “unimaginable” referring to the concept of infinity. Injinaash works with numerals of up to 10^{59}. Of these two scholars, the Rolbiidorj’s numerals, their names and sequencing are commonly accepted and used today, for example, in the calculations and documents pertaining to the Mongolian Government budget.

== Base numbers ==
Numbers from 1 to 9 are referred to as "dan", meaning "simple".

#	Mongolian numerals		Tibetan numerals
#	Upright	Rotated	Tibetan numerals
0	᠐	᠐	༠
1	᠑	᠑	༡
2	᠒	᠒	༢
3	᠓	᠓	༣
4	᠔	᠔	༤
5	᠕	᠕	༥
6	᠖	᠖	༦
7	᠗	᠗	༧
8	᠘	᠘	༨
9	᠙	᠙	༩

== Extended numbers ==
Name	Power Notation	Short scale Western
аравт (aravt)	10	ten
зуут (dzuut)	10^{2}	hundred
мянгат (myangat)	10^{3}	1 thousand
түмт (tümt)	10^{4}	10 thousand
бумт (bumt)	10^{5}	100 thousand
саят (sayat)	10^{6}	1 million
живаа (jivaa)	10^{7}	10 million
дүнчүүр (dünchüür)	10^{8}	100 million
тэрбум (terbum)	10^{9}	1 billion
их тэрбум (ikh terbum)	10^{10}	10 billion
наяд (nayad)	10^{11}	100 billion
их наяд (ikh nayad)	10^{12}	1 trillion
Тавьшгүй (Tavishgui)	10^{13}	10 trillion
Их тавьшгүй (Ikh tavishgui)	10^{14}	100 trillion
тунамал (tunamal)	10^{15}	1 quadrillion
их тунамал (ikh tunamal)	10^{16}	10 quadrillion
ингүүмэл (ingüümel)	10^{17}	100 quadrillion
их ингүүмэл (ikh ingüümel)	10^{18}	1 quintillion
хямралгүй (khyamralgüi)	10^{19}	10 quintillion
их хямралгүй (ikh khyamralgüi)	10^{20}	100 quintillion
ялгаруулагч (yalgaruulagch)	10^{21}	1 sextillion
их ялгаруулагч (ikh yalgaruulagch)	10^{22}	10 sextillion
өөр дээр (öör deer)	10^{23}	100 sextillion
их өөр дээр (ikh öör deer)	10^{24}	1 septillion
хөөн удирдагч (khöön udirdagch)	10^{25}	10 septillion
их хөөн удирдагч (ikh khöön udirdagch)	10^{26}	100 septillion
хязгаар үзэгдэл (khyadzgaar üdzegdel)	10^{27}	1 octillion
их хязгаар үзэгдэл (ikh khyadzgaar üdzegel)	10^{28}	10 octillion
шалтгааны зүйл (shaltgaany dzüyl)	10^{29}	100 octillion
их шалтгааны зүйл (ikh shaltgaany dzüyl)	10^{30}	1 nonillion
үзэсгэлэн гэрэлт (üdzesgelen gerelt)	10^{31}	10 nonillion
их үзэсгэлэн гэрэлт (ikh üdzesgelen gerelt)	10^{32}	100 nonillion
эрхт (erkht)	10^{33}	1 decillion
их эрхт (ikh erkht)	10^{34}	10 decillion
сайтар хүргэсэн (saytar khürgesen)	10^{35}	100 decillion
их сайтар хүргэсэн (ikh saytar khürgesen)	10^{36}	1 undecillion
олон одох (olon odokh)	10^{37}	10 undecillion
их олон одох (ikh olon odokh)	10^{38}	100 undecillion
живэх тоосон билэг (jivekh tooson bileg)	10^{39}	1 duodecillion
их живэх тоосон билэг (ikh jivekh tooson bileg)	10^{40}	10 duodecillion
билэг тэмдэг (bilet temdeg)	10^{41}	100 duodecillion
их билэг тэмдэг (ikh bilet temdeg)	10^{42}	1 tredecillion
хүчин нөхөр (khüchin nökhör)	10^{43}	10 tredecillion
их хүчин нөхөр (ikh khüchin nökhör)	10^{44}	100 tredecillion
тохио мэдэхүй (tokhio medekhüi)	10^{45}	1 quattuordecillion
их тохио мэдэхүй (ikh tokhio medekhüi)	10^{46}	10 quattuordecillion
тийн болсон (tiin bolson)	10^{47}	100 quattuordecillion
их тийн болсон (ikh tiin bolson)	10^{48}	1 quindecillion
хүчин нүд (khüchin nud)	10^{49}	10 quindecillion
их хүчин нүд (ikh khüchin nüd)	10^{50}	100 quindecillion
асрахуй (asrakhui)	10^{51}	1 sexdecillion
их асрахуй (ikh asrakhui)	10^{52}	10 sexdecillion
нигүүлсэнгүй (nigüülsengüi)	10^{53}	100 sexdecillion
их нигүүлсэнгүй (ikh nigüülsengüi)	10^{54}	1 septendecillion
баясгалангуй (bayasgalangui)	10^{55}	10 septendecillion
их баясгалангуй (ikh bayasgalangui)	10^{56}	100 septendecillion
тоолшгүй (toolshgüi)	10^{57}	1 octodecillion
хэмжээлшгүй (khemjeelshgüi)	10^{58}	10 octodecillion
цаглашгүй (tsaglashgüi)	10^{59}	100 octodecillion
өгүүлшгүй (ögüülshgüi)	10^{60}	1 novemdecillion
хэрэглэшгүй (kheregleshgüi)	10^{61}	10 novemdecillion
үйлдэж дуусашгүй (üildej duusashgüi)	10^{62}	100 novemdecillion
үлэшгүй (üleshgüi)	10^{63}	1 vigintillion
хирлэшгүй (khirleshgüi)	10^{64}	10 vigintillion
үлэж дуусашгүй (ülej duusashgüi)	10^{65}	100 vigintillion
сэтгэшгүй (setgeshgüi)	10^{66}	1 unvigintillion
