= Eastern Arabic numerals =

Numerals used in the eastern Arab world and Asia

Evolution of Indian numerals into Arabic and Eastern Arabic numerals along with their adoption in Europe

The Eastern Arabic numerals, also called Indo-Arabic numerals, or Arabic–Indic numerals, as designated by Unicode, are the symbols used to represent numerical digits in conjunction with the Arabic script in the countries of the Mashriq (the east of the Arab world, including the Arabian Peninsula), and the variants in other countries that use the Persian numerals in greater Iran and Asia.

The early Hindu–Arabic numeral system used a variety of shapes. It is unknown when the Western Arabic numeral shapes diverged from those of Eastern Arabic numerals. The Western digits 1, 2, 3, 4, 5 and 9 are clearly related, but the origins of 6, 7 and 8 are obscure.

== Origin ==
The numeral system originates from an ancient Indian numeral system, which was reintroduced during the Islamic Golden Age in the book On the Calculation with Hindic Numerals written by the Persian mathematician and engineer al-Khwarizmi, whose name was Latinized as Algoritmi. (Note: Other Latin transliterations include Algaurizin.)

== Other names ==
These numbers are known as ʾarqām mašriqiyya (أَرْقَام مَشْرِقِيَّة) or ʾarqām hindiyya (أَرْقَام هِنْدِيَّة) in Arabic. They are sometimes also called Indic numerals or Arabic–Indic numerals in English. However, that is sometimes discouraged as it can lead to confusion with Devanagari numerals, used in Brahmic scripts of the Indian subcontinent.

== Numerals ==
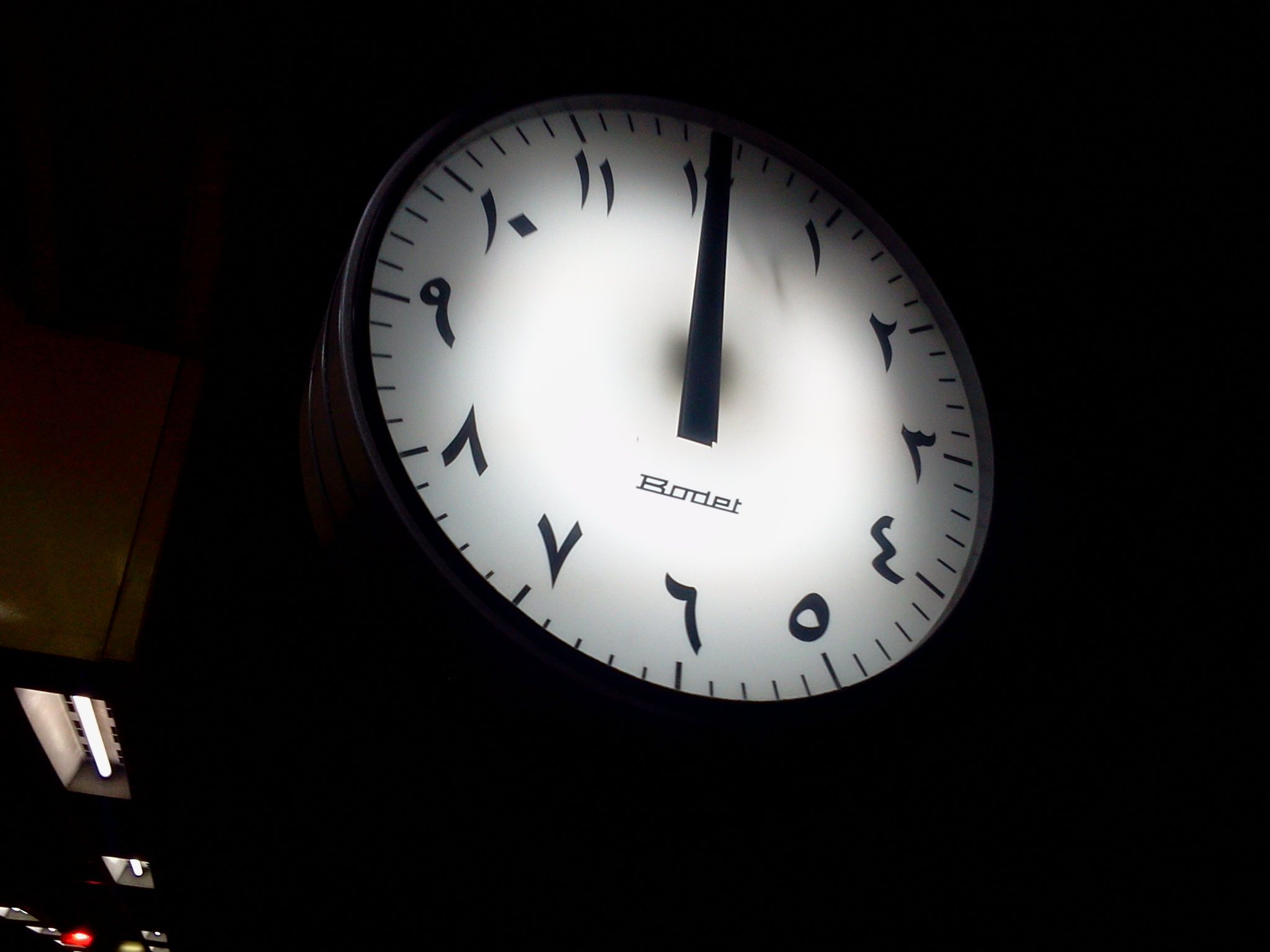
Eastern Arabic numerals on a clock in the Cairo Metro

Each numeral in the Persian variant has a different Unicode point even if it looks identical to the Eastern Arabic numeral counterpart. However, the variants used with Urdu and other languages of South Asia are not encoded separately from the Persian variants.

Western Arabic	0	1	2	3	4	5	6	7	8	9	10
Eastern Arabic (Note: U+0660 to U+0669)	٠	١	٢	٣	٤	٥	٦	٧	٨	٩	١٠
Persian (Note: U+06F0 to U+06F9. The numbers 4, 5, and 6 are different from Eastern Arabic.)	٠	١	٢	٣	۴	۵	۶	٧	٨	٩	١٠
Urdu (Note: Same Unicode characters as the Persian, but language is set to Urdu. The numerals 4, 6 and 7 are different from Persian. On some devices, this row may appear identical to Persian. Commonly used in Urdu, but other Pakistani languages may use Persian shapes for 4 or 7.)	٠	١	٢	٣	۴	۵	۶	۷	٨	٩	١٠
Abjad numerals		ا	ب	جـ	د	ھ	و	ز	حـ	ط	ى

Written numerals are arranged with their lowest-value digit to the right, with higher value positions added to the left. That is identical to the arrangement used for Western Arabic numerals, even though Arabic script is read from right-to-left. Columns of numbers are usually arranged with the decimal points aligned. In Arabic, negative signs are written to the right of magnitudes, e.g. −٣ (−3). In Persian, they are written to the left, e.g. ٣−.

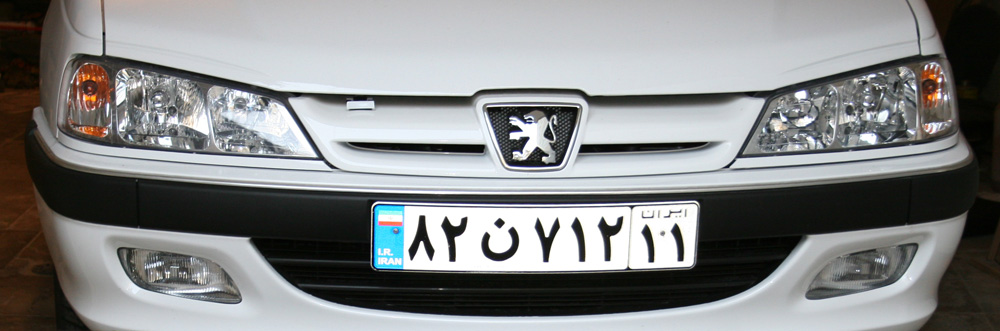
Eastern Arabic letters and numerals on the license plate of a car in Iran, which reads "82N712-11"

In-line fractions are written with the numerator on the left and the denominator on the right of the fraction slash, e.g. ٢/٧ (2/7).

The Arabic decimal separator ٫ (U+066B) or the comma , is used as the decimal mark, as in ٣٫١٤١٥٩٢٦٥٣٥٨ (3.14159265358).

The Arabic thousands separator ٬ (U+066C) or quote ' or Arabic comma ، (U+060C) may be used as a thousands separator, e.g. ١٬٠٠٠٬٠٠٠٬٠٠٠ (1,000,000,000).

== Contemporary use ==
Urdu numeral ۴ (4)

Urdu numeral ۷ (7)

Eastern Arabic numerals are predominantly used over Western Arabic numerals in many countries to the east of the Arab world, notably Iran and Afghanistan.

Both Eastern and Western Arabic numerals are concurrently used (and are often employed alongside each other) across Arabic-speaking Asia, Egypt and Sudan, although Western Arabic numerals are increasingly favoured in the region, particularly in Saudi Arabia. The United Arab Emirates uses both Eastern and Western Arabic numerals.

In Pakistan, Western Arabic numerals are more extensively used digitally. Eastern numerals continue to see use in Urdu publications and newspapers, as well as signboards.

In the Maghreb, only Western Arabic numerals are commonly used today. In medieval times, this region used a slightly different variation of the system (from which, via Italy, Western Arabic numerals derive).

The Thaana writing system used for the Maldivian language adopted its first nine letters (haa, shaviyani, noonu, raa, baa, ihaviyani, kaafu, alifu, and vaavu) from Perso-Arabic numerals.

== See also ==
- Arabic numerals
- Abjad numerals
