= Shan alphabet =

Abugida used for writing Tai Pong in China and Tai Yai in Myanmar

Shan script လိၵ်ႈတႆး
- Script type: Abugida
- Period: c. 1407 CE – present
- Direction: Left-to-right
- Languages: Shan language

Related scripts
- Parent systems: Proto-Sinaitic alphabet: Phoenician alphabet; Aramaic alphabet; Brāhmī; Tamil-Brahmi; Pallava script; Mon-Burmese script; Burmese alphabet; Shan script
- Child systems: Lik-Tai

Unicode
- Unicode range: U+1000–U+109F Myanmar

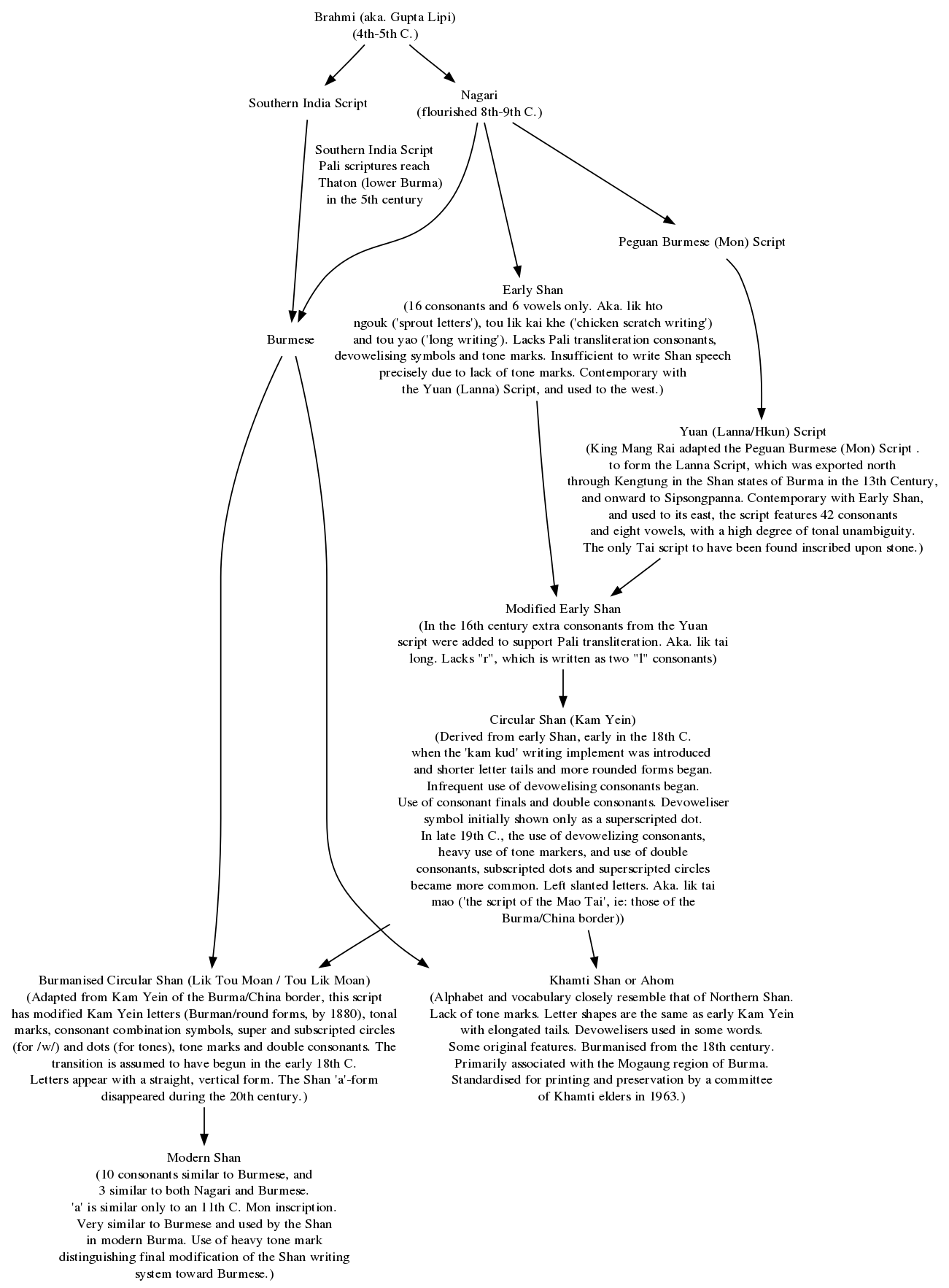
Graphical summary of the development of Tai scripts from a Shan perspective, as reported in Sai Kam Mong's Shan Script book.

The Shan script is a Brahmic abugida, used for writing the Shan language, which was derived from the Burmese script. Due to its recent reforms, the Shan alphabet is more phonetic than other Burmese-derived scripts.

== History ==
Around the 15th or 16th centuries, the Mon–Burmese script was borrowed and adapted to write a Tai language of northern Burma. This adaptation eventually resulted in the Shan alphabet, as well as the Tai Le script, Ahom script and Khamti script. This group of scripts has been called the "Lik Tai" scripts or "Lik" scripts, and are used by various Tai peoples in northeastern India, northern Myanmar, southwestern Yunnan, and northwestern Laos.According to the scholar Warthon, evidence suggests that the ancestral Lik-Tai script was borrowed from the Mon–Burmese script in the fifteenth century, most probably in the polity of Mong Mao. The scholar Daniels describes a Lik Tai script featured on a 1407 Ming dynasty scroll, which shows greater similarity to the Ahom script than to the Lik Tho Ngok (Tai Le) script. It is believed that the Ahom people had already adopted their script before migrating to the Brahmaputra Valley in the 13th century. However, modern linguistic and epigraphic research suggests that the development of the Ahom script likely occurred later than the 13th century. The earliest surviving Ahom inscription, the Snake Pillar inscription, dates only to the late 15th–early 16th century, and scholars generally agree that the script was adapted from a proto-Shan script derived from Burmese between the late 14th and 16th centuries.

Until the 1960s, Shan alphabet utilised vowel symbols and tone marks used in the Burmese script, which did not sufficiently distinguish all the phonemic distinctions in Shan. The alphabet was reformed to incorporate vowel signs, and additional tone markers to represent the high-falling creaky (ႉ), high-level (း), low (ႇ), and mid-level, mid-falling tones (ႈ) and the addition of the Thai visarga (ႊ) to represent the sixth tone used in northern Shan dialects.

== Characteristics ==
The Shan alphabet is characterised by the circular letter forms of the Mon-Burmese script. It is an abugida, all letters having an inherent vowel /a/. Vowels are represented in the form of diacritics placed around the consonants. It is written left to right

=== Vowels ===
The representation of the vowels depends partly on whether the syllable has a final consonant. They are typically arranged in the manner below to show the logical relationships between the medial and the final forms and between the individual vowels and the vowel clusters they help form.

Vowels
Medial	◌ a unmarked	ၢ aa IPA: ɑː	ိ i IPA: i	ဵ e IPA: e	ႅ ae IPA: æ	ု u IPA: u	ူ o IPA: o	ွ aw/o IPA: ɔ	ို eu IPA: ɯ	ိူ oe IPA: ə	ႂ wa IPA: ʷ
Final		ႃ aa IPA: ɑː	ီ ii IPA: iː	ေ e IPA: e	ႄ ae IPA: æ	ူ uu IPA: uː	ူဝ် o IPA: o	ေႃ aw/o IPA: ɔ	ိုဝ် eu IPA: ɯ	ိူဝ် oe IPA: ə	
Final	ႆ ai IPA: ai	ၢႆ aai IPA: aːi				ုၺ် ui IPA: ui	ူၺ် ohi/uai IPA: oi	ွႆ oi/oy IPA: ɔi	ိုၺ် uei/uey IPA: ɨi	ိူၺ် oei/oey IPA: əi	
Final	ဝ် aw IPA: au	ၢဝ် aaw IPA: aːu	ိဝ် iu IPA: iu	ဵဝ် eo IPA: eu	ႅဝ် aeo IPA: æu				ႂ် aɨ IPA: aɯ		

=== Consonants ===
The Shan alphabet is much less complex than those of related Tai-Kadai languages like Thai. Having been reformed recently, Shan lacks many of the historical spelling remnants in Thai and Burmese. Compared to the Thai alphabet, it lacks the notions of high-class, mid-class and low-class consonants, distinctions which help the Thai script to number 44 consonants. Shan has only 19 consonants.

The number of consonants in a textbook may vary: there are 19 universally accepted Shan consonants (ၵ ၶ င ၸ သ ၺ တ ထ ၼ ပ ၽ ၾ မ ယ ရ လ ဝ ႁ ဢ) and five more which represent sounds not found in Shan, g, z, b, d and th [θ]. These five (ၷ ၹ ၿ ၻ ႀ) are quite rare. The consonant ရ occurs only in loanwords, as the consonant has otherwise merged ႁ in Shan. In addition, most editors include a dummy consonant (ဢ) used in words with a vowel onset. A textbook may therefore present 18-24 consonants.

Like other Brahmi scripts, Shan consonants are typically arranged in rows based on place of articulation with columns based on aspiration and voicing ( Used to spell loan words and Pali):

ၵ ka IPA: ka	ၶ kha IPA: kʰa	ၷ ga IPA: ɡa	ꧠ gha IPA: ɡʰa	င nga IPA: ŋa
ၸ tsa IPA: t͡ɕa	ႀ xa IPA: θa	ၹ dza IPA: d͡ʑ	ꧢ ja IPA: d͡ʒ	ၺ nya IPA: ɲa
ꩦ ṭa IPA: ʈa	ꩧ ṭha IPA: ʈʰa	ꩨ ḍa IPA: ɖa	ꩩ ḍha IPA: ɖʰa	ꧣ ṇa IPA: ɳa
တ ta IPA: ta	ထ tha IPA: tʰa	ၻ da IPA: da	ꩪ dha IPA: dʰa	ၼ na IPA: na
ပ pa IPA: pa	ၽ / ၾ pha / fa IPA: pʰa / fa	ၿ ba IPA: ba	ꧤ bha IPA: bʰa	မ ma IPA: ma
ယ ya IPA: ja	ရ ra IPA: ra	လ la IPA: la	ဝ wa IPA: wa	သ sa IPA: /θa/
	ႁ ha IPA: ha	ꩮ ḷa IPA: ɭa	ဢ a IPA: ʔa	

Final consonants and other symbols
မ် IPA: m	ၼ် IPA: n	င် IPA: ŋ	ပ် IPA: p	တ် IPA: t	ၵ် IPA: k	ျ IPA: ja	ြ IPA: ra	ႂ IPA: wa

=== Tones ===
The tones are indicated by tone markers at the end of the syllable. Shan tonal markers are mostly unambiguous and phonetic. In the absence of any marker, the default is the rising tone.

Tone markers
1 ◌ rising	2 ႇ low	3 ႈ mid-falling	4 း high	5 ႉ high-falling and creaky	6 ႊ emphatic or middle

While the reformed script originally used only four diacritic tone markers, equivalent to the five tones spoken in the southern dialect, the Lashio-based Shan Literature and Culture Association now, for a number of words, promotes the use of the 'yak khuen' (Shan: ယၵ်းၶိုၼ်ႈ) to denote the sixth tone as pronounced in the north.

== Numerals ==
There are differences between the numerals used by the Shan script in China and Myanmar. The numerals used by Shan in China are similar to the numbers in Tham script and Tai Le script in China and the numbers in Burmese, while the Shan numerals in Myanmar form their own system, similar to the Burmese Tai Le numerals.

Burmese Shan and Tai Le	0 ႐	1 ႑	2 ႒	3 ႓	4 ႔	5 ႕	6 ႖	7 ႗	8 ႘	9 ႙
Chinese Shan and Tai Le	᧐	᧑	ᥨ	၃	၄	၅	᧖	၇	᧘	᧙

== Punctuation ==
There are three main punctuation marks in Shan script with an addition mark for letter reduplication, typically as shorthand.

၊ comma	။ full stop	႟ exclamation	ꧦ letter reduplication

== Syllables ==
Below are charts with syllables showcasing how of Shan script vowels and consonants are combined.

Monophthongs combined with the consonant ⟨ၵ⟩, ka.
ၵ + ◌◌ ၵ kǎ IPA: /ka˨˦/	ၵ + ◌ႃ ၵႃ kǎa IPA: /kaː˨˦/	ၵ + ◌ိ ၵိ kǐ IPA: /ki˨˦/	ၵ + ◌ီ ၵီ kǐi IPA: /kiː˨˦/	ၵ + ◌ေ ၵေ kǎe IPA: /keː˨˦/	ၵ + ◌ႄ ၵႄ kě IPA: /kɛː˨˦/
ၵ + ◌ု ၵု kǔ IPA: /ku˨˦/	ၵ + ◌ ူ ၵူ kǔu IPA: /kuː˨˦/	ၵ + ◌ူဝ် ၵူဝ် kǒ IPA: /koː˨˦/	ၵ + ◌ေႃ ၵေႃ kǎu IPA: /kɔː˨˦/	ၵ + ◌ိုဝ် ၵိုဝ် kǔe IPA: /kɯː˨˦/	ၵ + ◌ိူဝ် ၵိူဝ် kǒe IPA: /kɤː˨˦/

Diphthongs combined with the consonant ⟨ၵ⟩, ka.
ၵ + ႆ ၵႆ kǎi IPA: /kaj˨˦/	ၵ + ၢႆ ၵၢႆ kǎai IPA: /kaːj˨˦/	ၵ + ွႆ ၵွႆ kǎui IPA: /kɔj˨˦/	ၵ + ုၺ် ၵုၺ် kǔi IPA: /kuj˨˦/	ၵ + ူၺ် ၵူၺ် kǒi IPA: /koj˨˦/	ၵ + ိုၺ် ၵိုၺ် kǔei IPA: /kɯj˨˦/	ၵ + ိူၺ် ၵိူၺ် kǒei IPA: /kɤj˨˦/
ၵ + ဝ် ၵဝ် kǎo IPA: /kaw˨˦/	ၵ + ၢဝ် ၵၢဝ် kǎao IPA: /kaːw˨˦/	ၵ + ိဝ် ၵိဝ် kǐo IPA: /kiw˨˦/	ၵ + ဵဝ် ၵဵဝ် kǎei IPA: /kew˨˦/	ၵ + ႅဝ် ၵႅဝ် kěo IPA: /kɛw˨˦/	ၵ + ႂ် ၵႂ် ʼǎue IPA: /kaɰ˨˦/	

Tones with the syllable ⟨ပႃ⟩, paa.
ပႃ pǎa IPA: /paː˨˦/	ပႃႇ pàa IPA: /paː˩/	ပႃႈ pāa IPA: /paː˧˧˨/	ပႃး páa IPA: /paː˥/	ပႃႉ pâ̰a IPA: /paː˦˨ˀ/	ပႃႊ pãa IPA: /paː˧˦˧/

== Unicode ==
The Shan script has been encoded as a part of the Myanmar block with the release version of Unicode 3.0.

Myanmar^{[1]} Official Unicode Consortium code chart (PDF)
	0	1	2	3	4	5	6	7	8	9	A	B	C	D	E	F
U+100x	က	ခ	ဂ	ဃ	င	စ	ဆ	ဇ	ဈ	ဉ	ည	ဋ	ဌ	ဍ	ဎ	ဏ
U+101x	တ	ထ	ဒ	ဓ	န	ပ	ဖ	ဗ	ဘ	မ	ယ	ရ	လ	ဝ	သ	ဟ
U+102x	ဠ	အ	ဢ	ဣ	ဤ	ဥ	ဦ	ဧ	ဨ	ဩ	ဪ	ါ	ာ	ိ	ီ	ု
U+103x	ူ	ေ	ဲ	ဳ	ဴ	ဵ	ံ	့	း	္	်	ျ	ြ	ွ	ှ	ဿ
U+104x	၀	၁	၂	၃	၄	၅	၆	၇	၈	၉	၊	။	၌	၍	၎	၏
U+105x	ၐ	ၑ	ၒ	ၓ	ၔ	ၕ	ၖ	ၗ	ၘ	ၙ	ၚ	ၛ	ၜ	ၝ	ၞ	ၟ
U+106x	ၠ	ၡ	ၢ	ၣ	ၤ	ၥ	ၦ	ၧ	ၨ	ၩ	ၪ	ၫ	ၬ	ၭ	ၮ	ၯ
U+107x	ၰ	ၱ	ၲ	ၳ	ၴ	ၵ	ၶ	ၷ	ၸ	ၹ	ၺ	ၻ	ၼ	ၽ	ၾ	ၿ
U+108x	ႀ	ႁ	ႂ	ႃ	ႄ	ႅ	ႆ	ႇ	ႈ	ႉ	ႊ	ႋ	ႌ	ႍ	ႎ	ႏ
U+109x	႐	႑	႒	႓	႔	႕	႖	႗	႘	႙	ႚ	ႛ	ႜ	ႝ	႞	႟
Notes 1.As of Unicode version 17.0

== Gallery ==
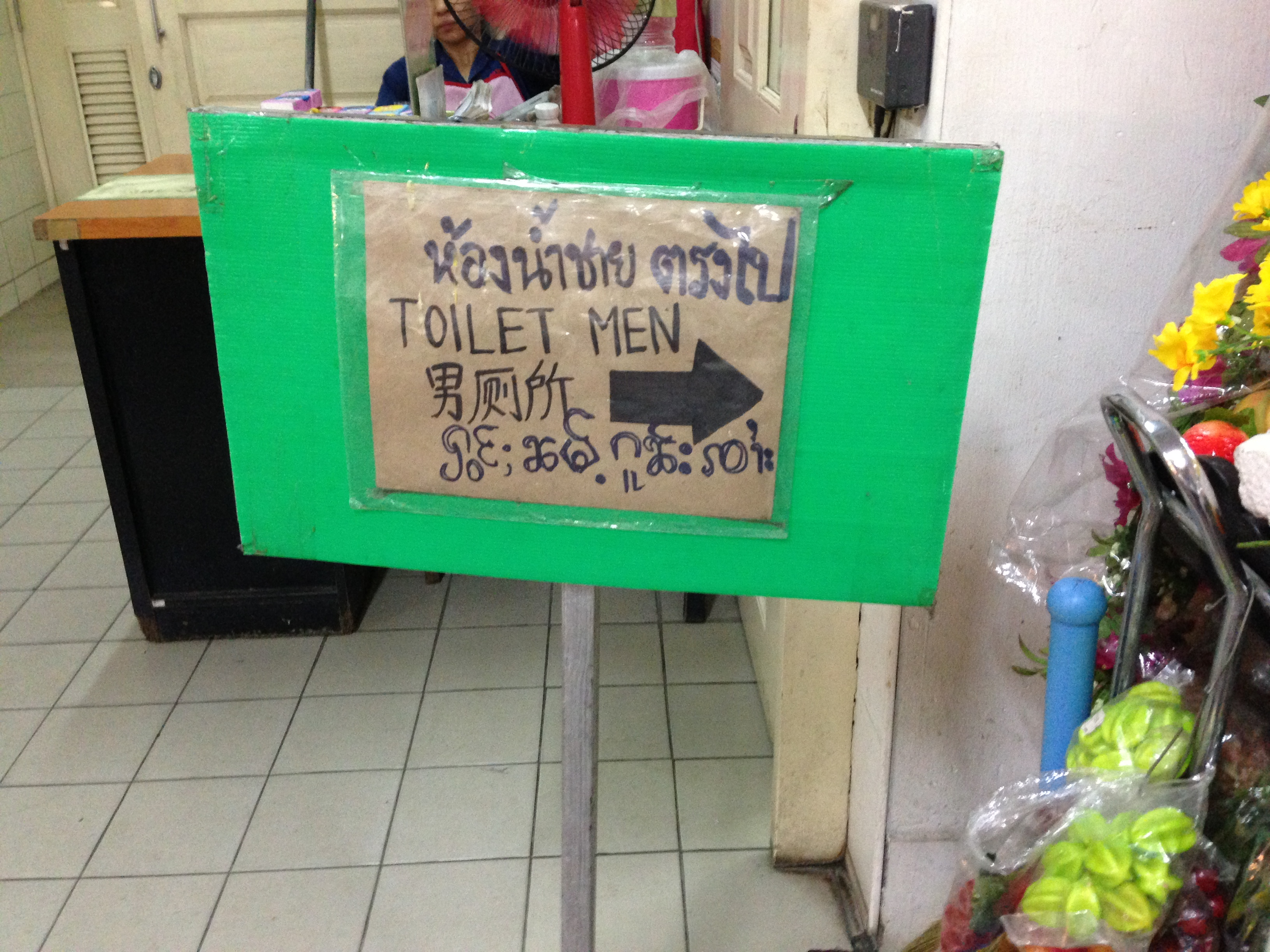
A sign written in Shan along with other languages in Chiang Mai, Thailand

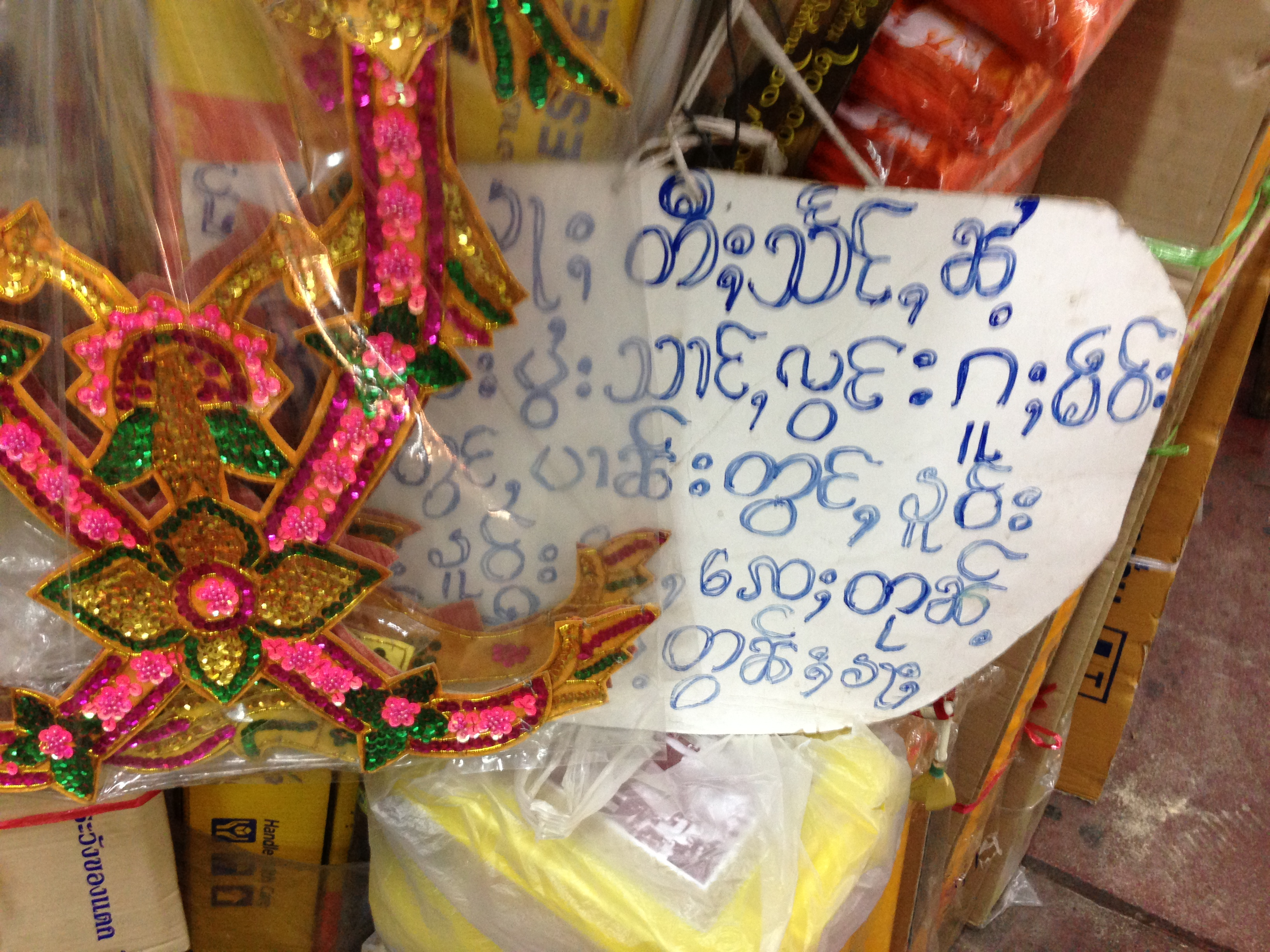
A sign written in Shan in Chiang Mai, Thailand
