= Balinese numerals =

The Balinese language has an elaborate decimal numeral system.

== Basic numerals ==
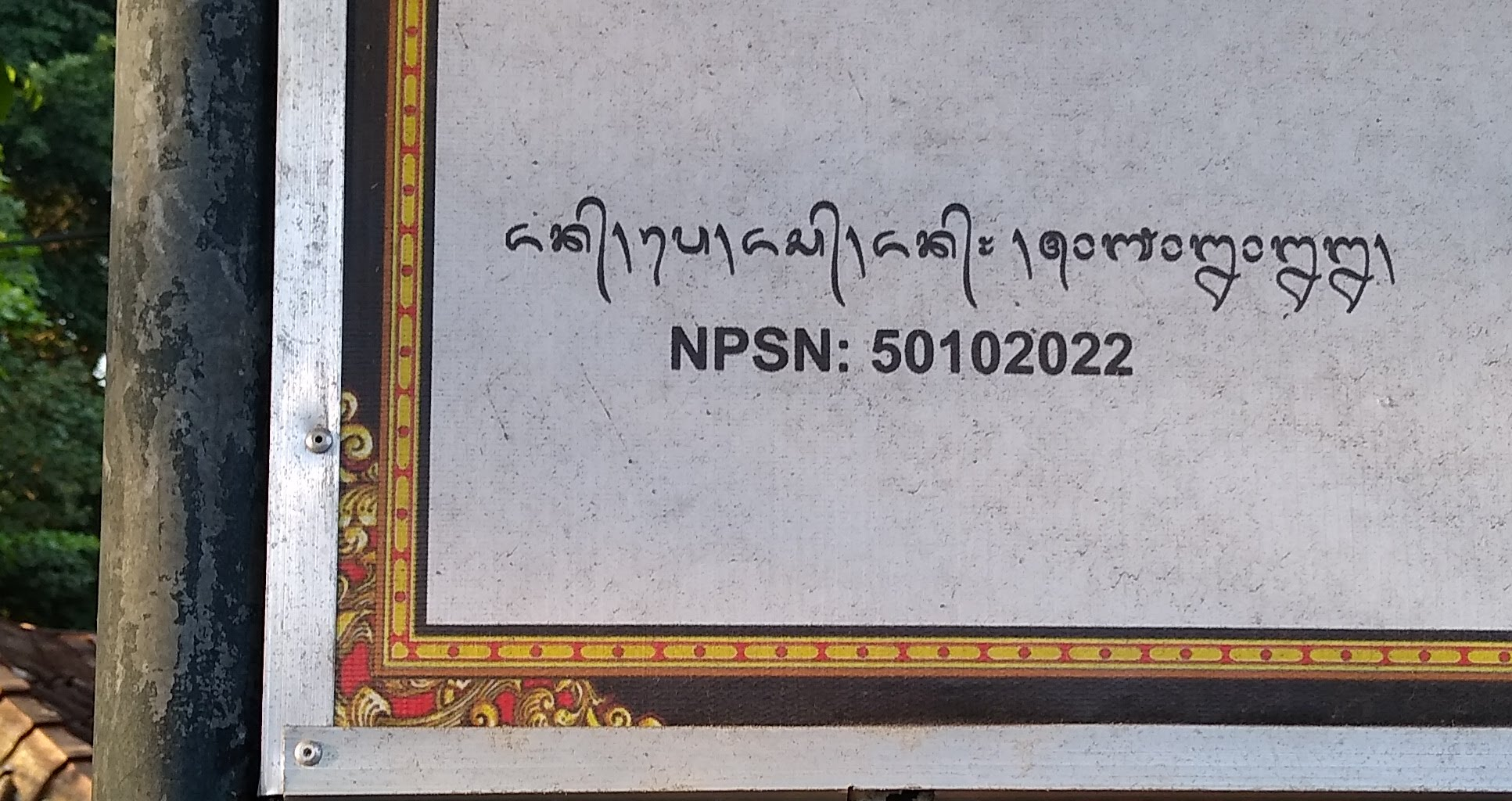
A school identification number in Bali, written with Balinese numerals above and Arabic numerals below

The numerals 1–10 have basic, combining, and independent forms, many of which are formed through reduplication. The combining forms are used to form higher numbers. In some cases there is more than one word for a numeral, reflecting the Balinese register system; halus (high-register) forms are listed in italics.

Final orthographic -a is a schwa [ə].

Numeral	Basic	Combining	Independent
1	besik	a-, sa-*	abesik, aukud
1	(a)siki	a-, sa-*	abesik, aukud
2	dua	duang-	dadua
2	kalih	kalih-	kakalih
3	telu	telung-	tetelu
3	tiga	tigang-	tetiga
4	(em)pat	petang-	pa(t)pat
5	lima	limang-	lelima
6	(e)nem	nem-	ne(m)nem
7	pitu	pitung-	pepitu
8	(a)kutus	kutus-, ulung-	akutus
9	(a)sia	sia-, sangang-	asia
10	(a)dasa	dasa-	adasa

* A less productive combining form of a- 1 is sa-, as can be seen in many of the numbers below. It, ulung-, and sangang- are from Javanese. Tiga 3 is from Sanskrit trika. Dasa 10 is from Sanskrit daśa.

== Teens, tweens, and tens ==
Like English, Balinese has compound forms for the teens and tens; however, it also has a series of compound 'tweens', 21–29. The teens are based on a root *-welas, the tweens on -likur, and the tens are formed by the combining forms above. Hyphens are not used in the orthography, but have been added to the table below to clarify their derivation.

Unit	Teens	Tweens	Tens
1	solas 11	se-likur 21	(a-dasa 10)
2	rolas 12	dua-likur 22	duang-dasa 20
2	rolas 12	kalih-likur	kalih-dasa
3	telu-las 13	telu-likur 23	telung-dasa 30
3	telu-las 13	tigang-likur	tigang-dasa
4	pat-belas 14	pat-likur 24	petang-dasa 40
5	lim-olas 15	salaé 25	seket 50
6	nem-belas 16	nem-likur 26	nem-dasa 60
7	pitu-las 17	pitu-likur 27	pitung-dasa 70
8	pelekutus 18	ulu-likur 28	kutus-dasa, ulung-dasa 80
9	siang-olas 19	sanga-likur 29	sia-dasa, sangang-dasa 90

The high-register combining forms kalih- 2 and tigang- 3 are used with -likur, -dasa, and higher numerals (below), but not for the teens.

The teens are from Javanese, where the -olas forms are regular, apart from pele-kutus 18, which is suppletive. Sa-laé 25 (one thread [of 25 Chinese coins]), and se-ket 50 (one tie [of two threads of coins]) are also suppletive, and cognate with Javanese səlawé 25 and səkət 50.

There are additional numerals pasasur ~ sasur 35 and se-timahan ~ se-timan 45 (one opium packet [costing 45 coins]), and a compound telung-benang (three threads [of coins]) for 75.

== Higher numbers ==
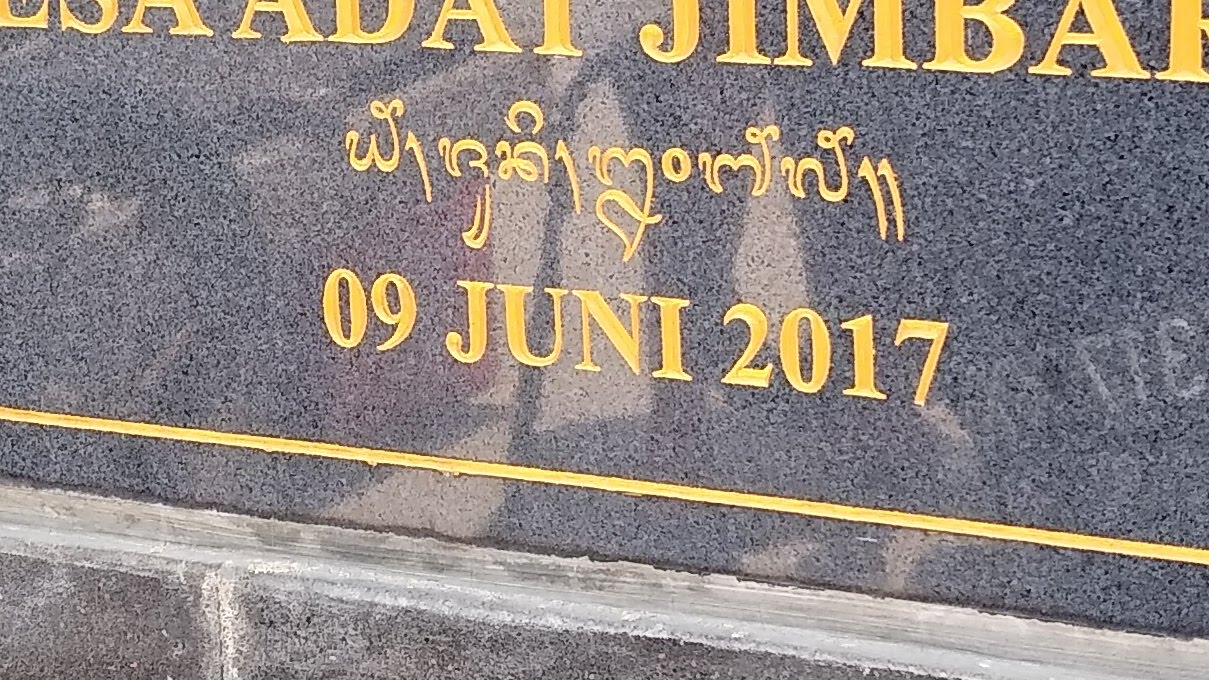
A date, written in Latin and Balinese script

The unit combining forms are combined with atus 100, atak 200, amas 400, tali 1000, laksa 10,000, keti 100,000, and yuta 1,000,000 as they do with dasa 10:

100	s-atus
200	s-atak
300	telung-atus (tigang-atus)
400	s-amas
500	limang-atus
600	telung-atak (tigang-atak)
700	pitung-atus
800	domas ( ← *dua-amas or *ro-amas)
900	sanga
1000	siu
1200	(e)nem-bangsit
2000	duang-tali (kalih-tali)
1,000,000	a-yuta

Atak is a 'bundle' (of 200 coins) and amas is 'gold' (a gold coin being worth 400 copper coins). In addition, there is karobelah 150, lebak 175, and sepa (one pa?) for 1600. At least karobelah has a cognate in Javanese, ro-bəlah, where ro- is the short form for two (as in rolas 12).

== See also ==
- Balinese script
- Javanese numerals
