= Chaturbhuj Temple, Gwalior =

9th-century Hindu temple in Madhya Pradesh, India

Zero Temple, Gwalior
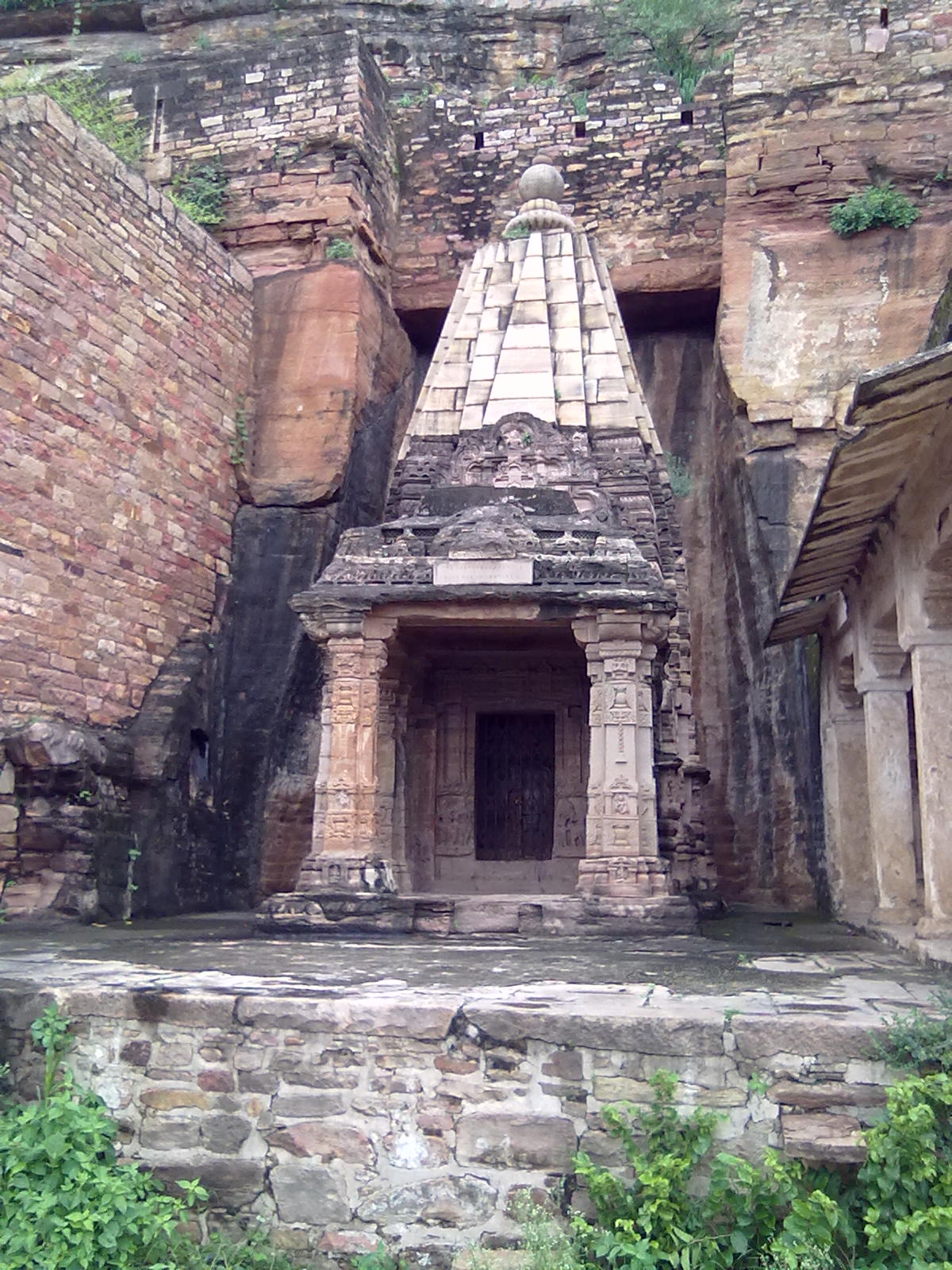
- Main Entrance to the Temple of Zero

- Location within India Location within Madhya Pradesh

Religion
- Affiliation: Hinduism
- District: Gwalior
- Deity: Vishnu, others

Location
- Location: Gwalior Fort
- State: Madhya Pradesh
- Country: India
- Coordinates: 26°13′50.8″N 78°10′12.1″E

Architecture
- Style: Nagara
- Completed: 8th-century

The Temple of Zero also known as Chaturbhuj Temple is a Hindu temple excavated in a rock face in the Gwalior Fort, in 875 AD, by Alla, the son of Vaillabhatta, and one of the grandsons of Nagabhatta II of Pratihara dynasty in present-day Gwalior, India.

== Temple ==
It is a relatively small temple with a square plan of 12 feet (3.7 m) side. The temple has a portico at its entrance supported by four carved pillars. The pillars show reliefs of individuals meditating in yoga asana position, as well as amorous couples. To the right of the portico is covered pillared mandapa, like a choultry. The doorway into the rock is flanked by goddess Ganga and Yamuna. The ceiling of the temple is a low square pyramid, similar to the Dhamnar temple. The tower (Shikhara) of the temple is North Indian Nagara style, that slowly curves with a square plan, all carved out of the monolithic rock. It has an inscription that opens with a praise for Vishnu (Vaishnavism), then Shiva (Shaivism) and nine Durgas (Shaktism), as well states that it was excavated in 876 CE (Samvat 933). Inside there is a wall relief of Varaha (Vishnu's man-boar avatar) and another of four armed Vishnu. It also a carving of the Hindu goddess Lakshmi with four arms. The name of the temple may be derived from four armed Vishnu and Lakshmi.

The temple is partially damaged, and much of the interior artwork is missing, with all the faces removed. Its tower has been restored, and a locked steel double-folding-expanding scissor-link see-through gate was installed.

== Earliest "zero" ==
One of the temple's inscriptions contains the earliest known inscription of the circular symbol "O", to represent zero; the earlier Bakhshali manuscript is regarded as the earliest existent use of zero. The inscription states, among other things, that the community planted a garden of 187 hastas by 270 hastas (1 hasta = 1.5 feet), that the garden yielded 50 garlands for the temple every day. The last digits of 270 and 50 are O-shaped. While Indian and non-Indian texts mention zero much earlier, this temple has the earliest known epigraphical evidence inscribed in stone that already knows and uses the concept of zero.

== Gallery ==
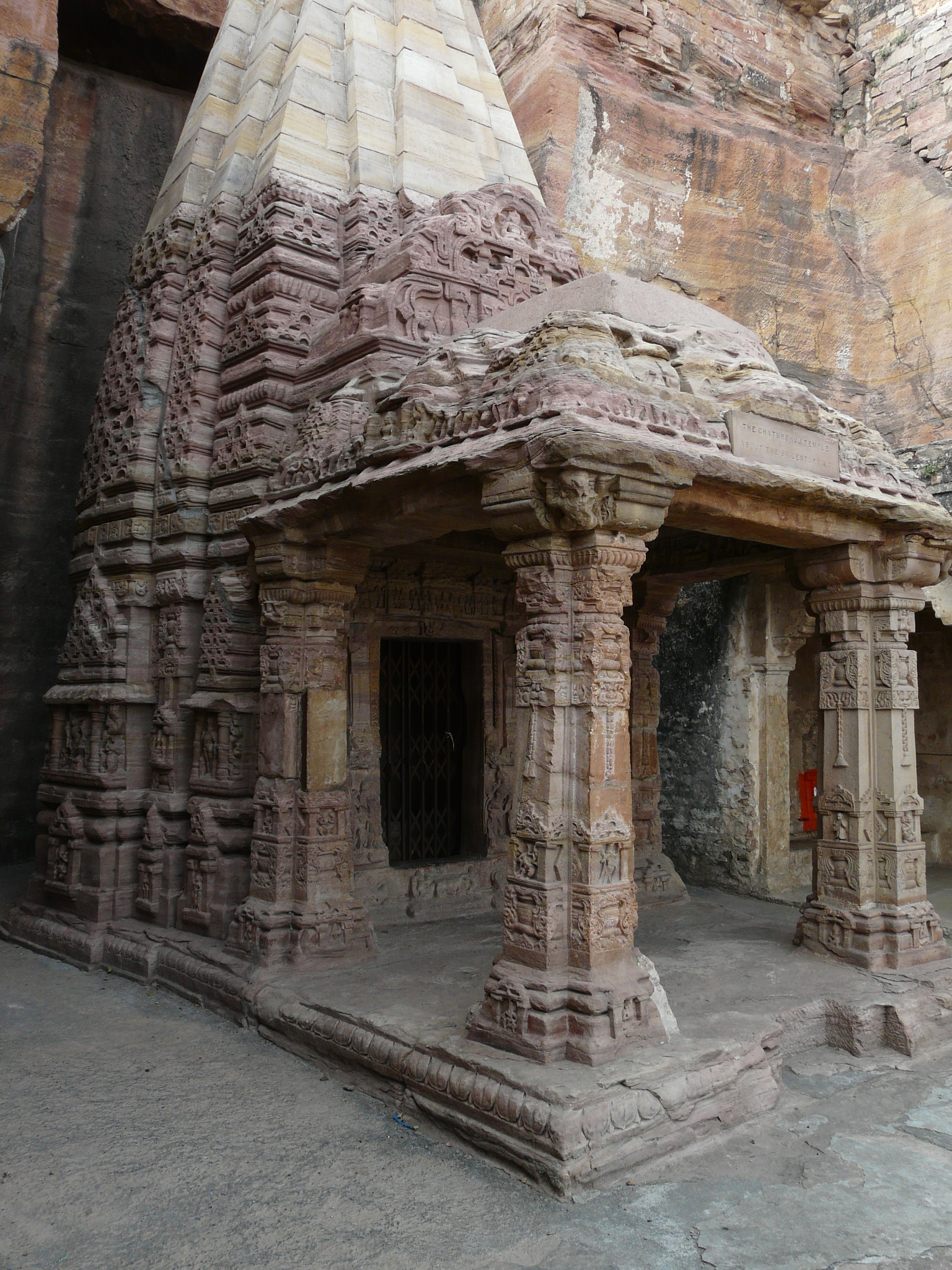
The temple, tower has been partially restored.

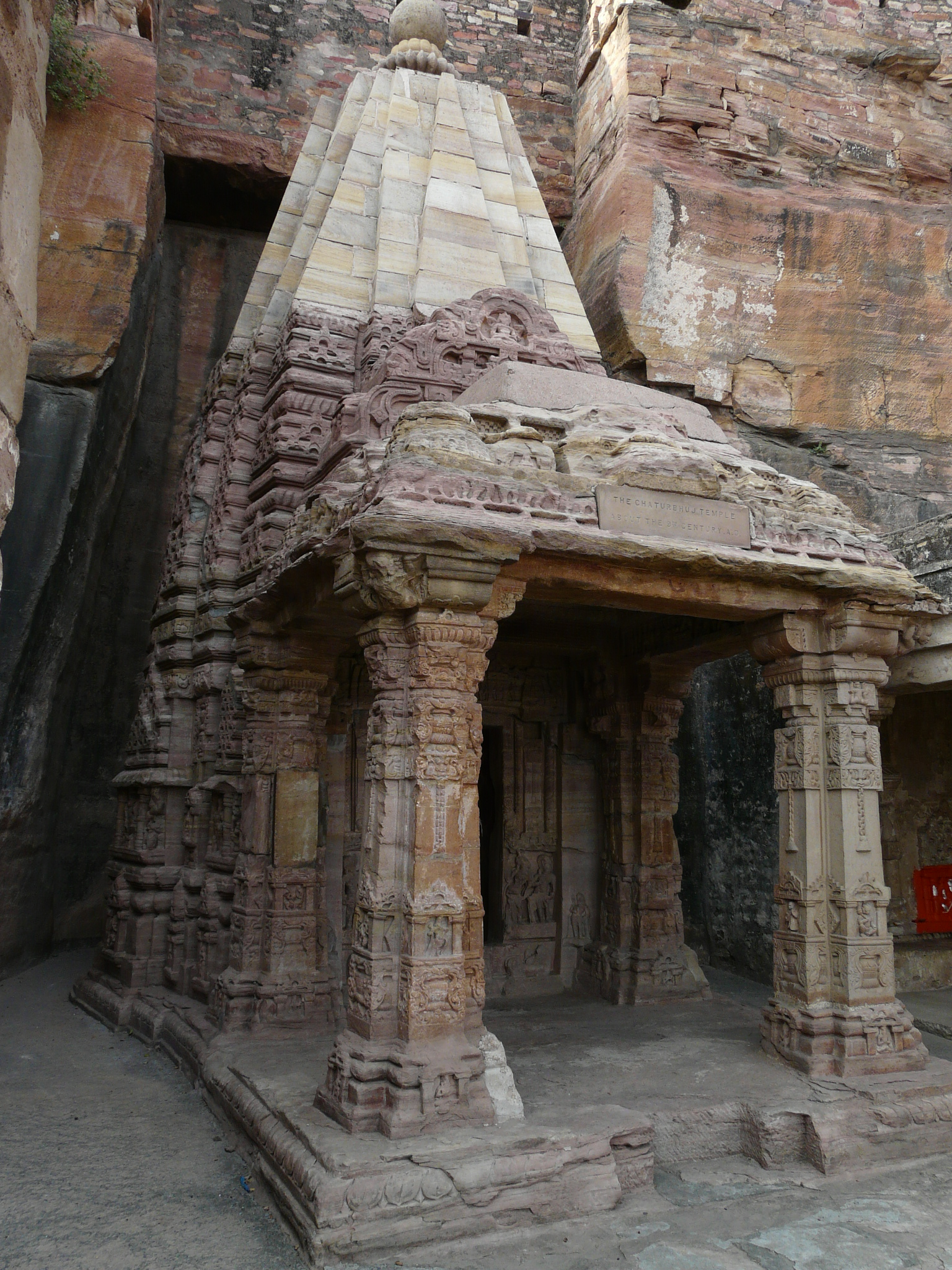
Outer walls of the temple are carved with Hindu deities.

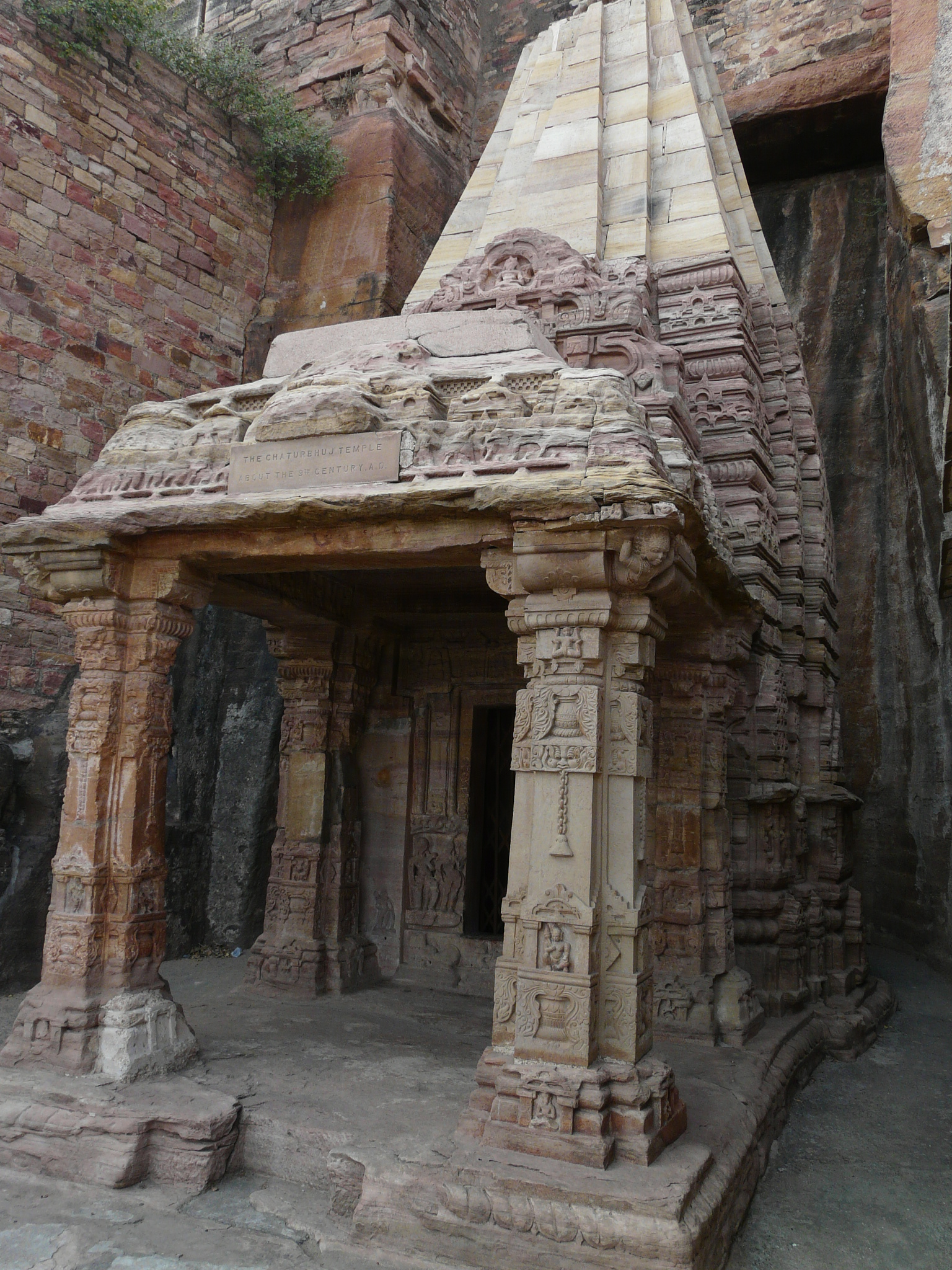
Pillar carvings.

== See also ==
- Bakhshali manuscript, contains "." (dot), the earliest known Indian use of a zero symbol
- Siddhachal Caves
- Telika Mandir
