= Deafness in Croatia =

Croatia has a population of approximately 3.8 million people as of 2026. Of those millions of people, about 80,000 of them are deaf or hard of hearing, according to the Croatian Association of the Deaf and Hard of Hearing.

== Human and Civil Rights ==
=== Convention on the Rights of Persons with Disabilities (CRPD) ===
Croatia signed the Convention on the Rights of Persons with Disabilities (CRPD) on March 30, 2007, which was ratified on August 15, 2007. According to the World Federation of the Deaf (WFD), the most important articles in the CRPD for deaf rights are as followed:

- Article 2 - Definition
- Article 9 - Accessibility
- Article 21 - Freedom of Expression
- Article 24 - Education
- Article 30 - Participation in Cultural Life

The most recent list of issues for Croatia was released in April 2020. The committee on the CRPD's feedback was as followed:

- Question 10b (Article 11) - Early warning systems, including sign language, must be provided so that all people with disabilities can be prepared for emergencies and respond quickly.
- Question 21 (Article 21) - Provide progress report on the application of the Ombudsman to ensure accessibility of TV programs for people with disabilities, specifically the deaf and blind.
- Question 21a (Article 21) - Explain the process of Croatian Sign Language being adopted as an official language in Croatia.
- Question 21b (Article 21) - Ensure that general public information is accessible in Croatian sign language.
- Question 21c (Article 21) - Explain steps that increased the number of Croatian sign language interpreters
- Question 23c (Article 24) - Include information on how it is ensured that teachers with disabilities are trained and hired, as well as teachers being trained in sign language and inclusivity in public schools.
- Question 28b (Article 28) - Explain how it is made sure that all people with disabilities have access to the equipment they need, including hearing aids.

The most recent periodic report from Croatia was released in September 2021, it is a combination of the second, third, and fourth reports following the CRPD. The document brings up the DHH community in the following sections:

- (72) - Regarding the Act on the Protection of Patients Rights, if a person is deaf and unable to read or write, they can give consent through a legal document, by giving consent in front of two witnesses.
- (77) - The Criminal Procedure Code (CPC) states that in legal situations, a person who is deaf has the right to translation or an interpreter in sign language when oral communication occurs and evidence is presented.
- (87) - Regarding the Transplantation of Human Organs for the Purpose of Treatment Act, a deaf person who cannot read or a deafblind person can give a statement of consent or refusal in the form of statement by a notary deed or giving a statement in front of two witnesses to a legally eligible person who can give a written statement on the person's behalf.
- (120) - The Act on the Croatian Sign Language and Other Communication Systems of the Deaf and the Deaf-Blind gives the right to use Croatian Sign Language and other communication methods to meet needs. The law aims to make sure that DHH people have equal access to society, education, information, culture, and the same rights and freedoms as everyone else. The act also ensures that deaf people have the right to communication support, such as sign language interpreters, when dealing with government offices or public institutions if their deafness causes a communication barrier.
- (191) - The National Sports Program (2019–2026) is the first national plan in Croatian history for sports that specifically focuses on providing equal opportunities for those with disabilities, and is being looked at by the Croatian Deaf Sports Association to ensure it is accessible for the DHH community.

=== Croatian Association of the Deaf and Hard of Hearing ===
The Croatian Association of the Deaf and Hard of Hearing was founded in 1921 in Zagreb, which makes it the oldest organization for people with disabilities in Croatia. The organization is a non-profit and non-governmental national organization that provides resources to Deaf and Hard of Hearing people. It has approximately 6,500 members throughout Croatia. The association is also a member of the World Federation of the Deaf.

The Croatian Association of the Deaf and Hard of Hearing states on their website that their mission is to remove communication barriers for deaf and hard of hearing people. They focus on supporting their members and enacting change to promote the rights, inclusion, and overall well-being of the DHH community.

== Sign Language ==
=== Croatian Sign Language ===
Croatian Sign Language, CSL (Hrvatski znakovni jezik, HZJ) was legally recognized by the Republic of Croatia in 2015 by the Act on the Croatian Sign Language and Other Communication Systems of the Deaf and the Deaf-Blind. HZJ is classified as a deaf community sign language with 6,500 deaf sign language users according to European Union of the Deaf (EUD).

The first school for the deaf was started by Adalbert Lampe in 1885 when he started teaching one boy at first, then gaining students. This was the first time, in Croatia, that multiple deaf children were taught at once. On October 1, 1888, Lampe officially founded the first school for the deaf in Zagreb, Croatia, called "Privatinstitut Lampe", using HZJ as the singular form of communication and teaching.

HZJ has origins from deaf schools in Austria an Hungary and was once considered a dialect of Yugoslavian Sign Language. It is unique because it has a one-handed system and a two-handed system for its finger spelling alphabet. The one handed system is similar to French Sign Language.

HZJ is graded at a 5 (developing) on the Expanded Graded Intergenerational Disruption Scale (EGIDS). This means that while the language is well used and taught, it is not yet widespread or sustainable.

== New Born Hearing Screenings ==
A study was done by the National Center for Hearing Assessment and Management at Utah State University to gather data on Newborn Hearing Screenings in 196 countries/territories. The study reported data from 2011 from Croatia, reporting 4,200 live births, and 99% going through the Universal Newborn Hearing Screening (UNHS), with 97% of them being with the Otoacoustic Emissions (OAE) process and 3% with the OAE with Automated Auditory Brainstem Response (OAE-AABR) process. The fail rate was 0.6%, the lost to follow up percent was 16.7%., and 1 in every thousand babies were diagnosed with Permanent Childhood Hearing Loss (PCHL). The mean age at diagnosis was 5 months, with a range of 1–19 months, and the mean age at start of treatment was 5.2 months with a range of 1–19 months. Screening was done 100% in birth facilities, and done 100% by nurses. The Universal Newborn Hearing Screening was legally mandated in 2006 in Croatia.

== Early Intervention ==
As stated in the previous section, The Universal Newborn Hearing Screening was legalized in 2006 in Croatia, and 99% of babies go through the testing.

=== United Nations Children's Fund ===
The United Nations Children's Fund (UNICEF) opened its doors in Croatia in 1991, before it was even officially recognized as a country. The organization helps families of children with disabilities and their goal is to ensure that every child gets education, healthcare, and protection. In 2020, the organization collected data of how many children in Croatia were receiving the early intervention they need. The study found that 24,169 children aged 0–5 in Croatia could use early intervention services, yet only 1 in every 8 actually receives them. The study also found that only 10% of families receiving services live in rural areas, and 85% of families don't receive services because facilities are too far from home. After these findings, the UNICEF has been working to improve accessibility so that every child has access to the resources they need.

=== Croatian Society For Cochlear Implantation ===
The Croatian Society for Cochlear Implantation is a subspecialty society of the Croatian Society of Otorhinolaryngology and Head & Neck Surgery. The Croatian Society for Cochlear Implantation does not have a website, but they are hosting the ESPCI 35th anniversary in 2027 in Dubrovnik, Croatia. The ESPCI is one of the largest international events that focuses on pediatric cochlear implantation, and is an event that gathers people in many fields, including scientists, clinicians, engineers, and speech therapists for workshops, lectures, presentations, and more.

== Early Education ==
There are generally three options for deaf education in Croatia, the SUVAG oral school, Slava Raškaj School for the Deaf, and mainstream education.

=== Deaf Schools ===
==== Privatinstitut Lampe (1885) ====
As stated in the Sign Languages section, the first deaf school in Croatia was founded in 1885 by Adalbert Lampe, who is the first known Croatian teacher of the deaf. Lampe was a deaf man and studied at the Viennese Institute for Deaf-Mute Children. He taught mostly in Croatian Sign language, and also used some written language and spoken German. His school taught 6 days a week, and had 10 students 1st-5th grade. The school was closed by the government in 1891.

==== State Institute for Deaf-Mute Children (1891) ====
After Lampe's school was closed by the government, the state established the first public residential deaf school in Zagreb, Croatia. The school used only oral education, trained teachers for the deaf, and published guides for parents of deaf children and handbooks on teaching lip reading. In 1926, the school started using acoustic methods for hearing rehabilitation and over time their oral education technique changed to highlight how hearing technology can support speech and language for DHH people.

==== Slava Raškaj School (1979) ====
In 1979, the State Institute for Deaf-Mute Children was renamed to be the Slava Raškaj Residential School for the Deaf. Education methods changed to include Croatian Sign Language as well as oral methods. The school is still open to this day and serves many students with additional disabilities as well. The school includes a preschool, elementary school, and a high school, and uses sign supported speech. Over the years, student demographics have changed to include fewer boarding students, fewer exclusively DHH students, and more students with multiple disabilities, speech and language impairments, and autism.

==== SUVAG Polyclinic (1961) ====
The SUVAG Polyclinic was founded in 1961 in Zagreb, Croatia. It is a center for hearing assessment, oral rehabilitation, and education for DHH children using the verbotonal method. The SUVAG polyclinic has an oral preschool for children 3-6 and an elementary school for grades 1-8, both are day schools. Oftentimes students who live outside Zagreb and attend the school stay with foster families. Over the past 20 years the number of students with speech and language impairments has increased and the number of students with hearing loss has decreased. The major goal of SUVAG is to prepare students for mainstream education.

=== Verbotonal Method ===
In the late 1950s, Petar Guberina, a Croatian scientist, developed the Verbotonal method of rehabilitation/education.The method aims to educate and rehabilitate speech by focusing on rhythm, intonation, and body movement. Electroacoustic equipment was developed in the 1960s support the method.

=== DHH Education in Mainstream Schools ===
Many DHH students in mainstream education receive educational assistants who help them with classroom participation and communication. However, most of these assistants are not Croatian Sign Language interpreters, because most mainstream DHH students use mostly spoken language, but some schools, mostly in Zagreb, provide educational interpreters.

=== Role of Cochlear Implants in DHH Education ===
The inclusion of cochlear implantation has changed deaf education significantly. Particularly, increasing the number of DHH students who attend mainstream schools and communicate using mostly spoken language.
