= Languages of Yugoslavia =

- Semi-official: Serbo-Croatian, Macedonian, Slovene
- Regional: Albanian
- Minority: Aromanian, Bulgarian, Czech, German, Hungarian, Italian, Venetian, Romani, Romanian, Pannonian Rusyn, Slovak, Turkish, Ukrainian
- Foreign: Russian, English, French

Languages of Yugoslavia are all languages spoken in former Yugoslavia. They are mainly Indo-European languages and dialects, namely dominant South Slavic varieties (Serbo-Croatian, Macedonian, and Slovene) as well as Albanian, Aromanian, Bulgarian, Czech, German, Italian, Venetian, Balkan Romani, Romanian, Pannonian Rusyn, Slovak and Ukrainian languages. There are also pockets where varieties of non-Indo-European languages, such as those of Hungarian and Turkish, are spoken.

== Language policies in Yugoslavia ==
From 1966, linguistic and ethnic divisions were part of the public discussion in Yugoslavia. Language policies were delegated to the communal level. Language situation was reflected in each republic's constitution, and more detailed in communal constitutions.

Yugoslavia established its language policies at the federal, republic, and communal levels.

Federal language policy was drafted by the following four principles:

1. Domestic measures were the basis of language policy.
2. Special measures were required. Guaranteeing "equal rights" for all ethnic groups was insufficient.
3. Integration of all nations and nationalities depends upon the ability of the politico-administrative structure to provide mechanisms of expression.
4. Each nation and nationality should have a direct voice in determining specific measures.

== List of languages in Yugoslavia ==
This is a list of the languages of the former country of Yugoslavia:

=== Official languages at a republican level ===
- Serbo-Croatian – a pluricentric language and dialect continuum of Bosnia and Herzegovina, Croatia, Montenegro and Serbia, split into four national standard varieties used in respective countries after the breakup of Yugoslavia: Bosnian, Croatian, Montenegrin and Serbian.
- Slovene language – the language of the Slovenes in Slovenia
- Macedonian language – the language of North Macedonia (previously the Former Yugoslav Republic of Macedonia)

=== Official minority languages ===
Various minority languages were used officially at various sub-federal levels:

- In SAP Vojvodina, there were four minority languages in official use:
  - Hungarian;
  - Romanian;
  - Pannonian Rusyn;
  - Slovak.
- In SAP Kosovo, Albanian was in official use.
- At a municipal level, the following languages were in official use:
  - Albanian, in parts of SR Macedonia and SR Montenegro;
  - Bulgarian, in parts of SR Serbia;
  - Czech, in parts of SAP Vojvodina, SR Slovenia and SR Croatia;
  - German, in parts of SR Croatia and SR Slovenia;
  - Hungarian, in parts of SR Slovenia and SR Croatia;
  - Italian, in parts of SR Slovenia and SR Croatia;
  - Pannonian Rusyn, in parts of SR Croatia and SR Slovenia;
  - Slovak, in parts of SR Croatia and SR Slovenia;
  - Turkish, in parts of SAP Kosovo and SR Macedonia;
  - Ukrainian, in parts of SR Croatia and SR Slovenia.

=== Non-official minority languages ===
- The following minority languages had native speakers in the country, but were not in official use:
  - Balkan Gagauz Turkish, spoken by the Turkish people of SAP Kosovo and SR Macedonia;
  - Romani, spoken throughout the country;
  - Romanian, spoken in parts of SR Serbia (especially Timok Valley).

== See also ==
- Languages of Bosnia and Herzegovina
- Languages of Croatia
- Languages of Kosovo
- Languages of Montenegro
- Languages of North Macedonia
- Languages of Serbia
- Languages of Slovenia
- Yugoslav Sign Language, a sign language based on Serbo-Croatian
- Languages of the Soviet Union
