= Yugoslav manual alphabet =

Alphabet used in Yugoslav Sign Language

The Yugoslav manual alphabet is two-handed manual alphabet that is used to spell in Yugoslav Sign Language. Some signs are modeled after letters of Serbian Cyrillic alphabet, others after Gaj's Latin alphabet, or stem from other sources.
