= English alphabet =

26-letter Latin-script alphabet

- An English-language pangram written in the typeface FF Dax
- Script type: Alphabet
- Period: c. 16th century – present
- Languages: English

Related scripts
- Parent systems: (Proto-writing): Egyptian hieroglyphs; Proto-Sinaitic script; Phoenician alphabet; Greek alphabet; Old Italic scripts; Latin alphabet; English alphabet
- Child systems: ISO basic Latin alphabet; Cherokee syllabary; Scots alphabet; Osage alphabet; Saanich writing system

ISO 15924
- ISO 15924: Latn (215), Latin

Unicode
- Unicode alias: Latin
- Unicode range: U+0000–U+007E Basic Latin

Modern English is written with a Latin-script alphabet consisting of 26 letters, with each having both uppercase and lowercase forms. The word alphabet is a compound of alpha and beta, the names of the first two letters in the Greek alphabet. The earliest Old English writing during the 5th century used a runic alphabet known as the futhorc. The Old English Latin alphabet was adopted from the 7th century onward—and over the following centuries, various letters entered and fell out of use. By the 16th century, the present set of 26 letters had largely stabilised:

- A a
- B b
- C c
- D d
- E e
- F f
- G g
- H h
- I i
- J j
- K k
- L l
- M m
- N n
- O o
- P p
- Q q
- R r
- S s
- T t
- U u
- V v
- W w
- X x
- Y y
- Z z

There are 5 vowel letters (A, E, I, O, U) and 19 consonant letters—as well as 2 letters (W and Y) which may function as either type. 4 consonants (L, M, N, and R, depending on the dialect) may also function as syllabic consonants. Written English has a large number of digraphs, such as ⟨ch⟩, ⟨ea⟩, ⟨oo⟩, ⟨sh⟩, and ⟨th⟩. Diacritics are generally not used to write native English words, which is unusual among orthographies used to write the languages of Europe.

== Letter names ==
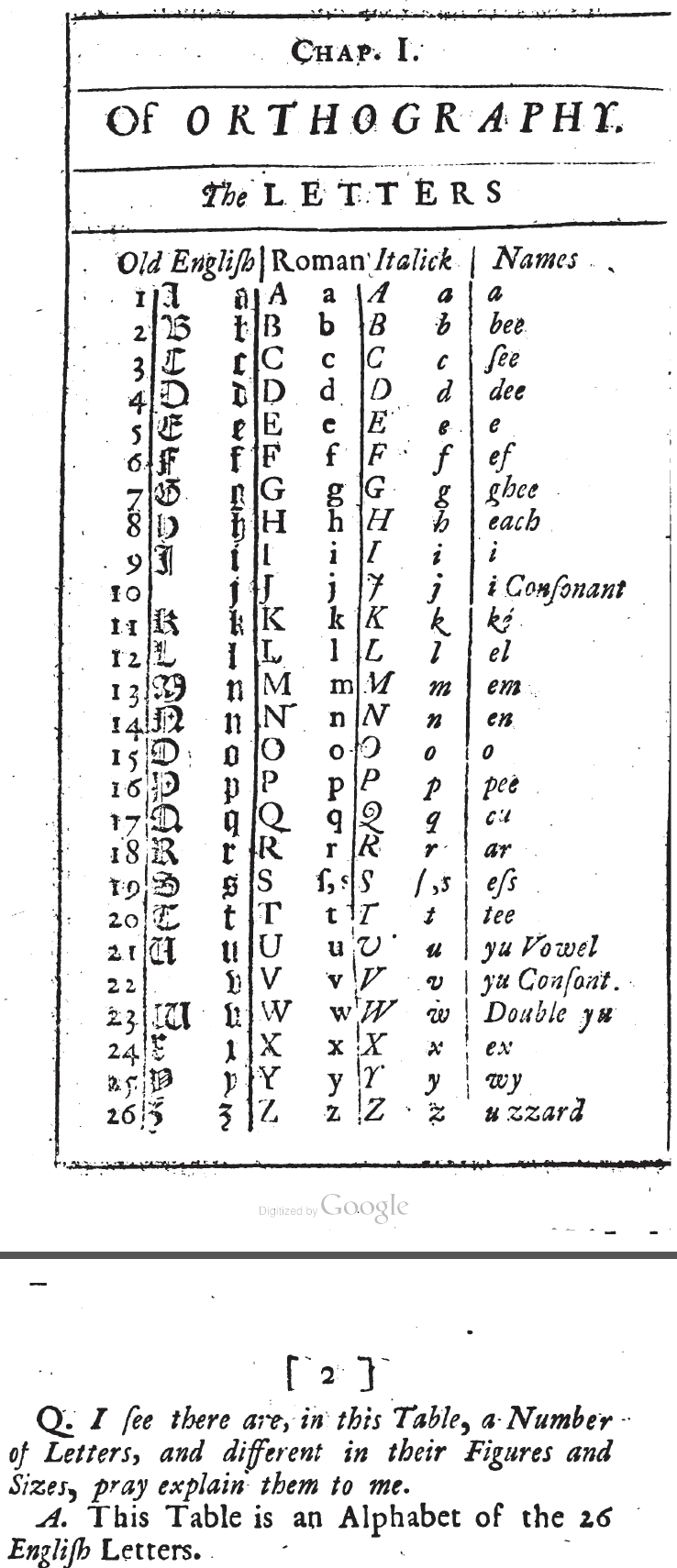
English alphabet from 1740, with some unusual letter names. (Note: Those being: i consonant for ⟨J⟩, yu vowel for ⟨U⟩, yu consonant for ⟨V⟩, and the archaic uzzard for ⟨Z⟩.) Note the use of long s ⟨ ſ ⟩.

English alphabet
A Received Pronunciation British English speaker reciting the English alphabet

The names of the letters are sometimes spelled out in compound words and initialisms (e.g., tee-shirt, deejay, emcee, okay, etc.), derived forms (e.g., exed out, (Note: Clicked the 🅇 box to close a tab or app) effing, (Note: Fucking) to eff and blind, aitchless, (Note: Without the letter ⟨H⟩) etc.), and objects named after letters (e.g., en and em in printing, and wye in railroading). The spellings listed below are from the Oxford English Dictionary.

Plurals of consonant names are formed by adding -s (e.g., bees, efs or effs, ems) or -es in the cases of aitches, esses, exes. Plurals of vowel names also take -es (i.e., aes, ees, ies, oes, ues), but these are rare. For a letter as a letter, the letter itself is most commonly used, generally in capitalised form, in which case the plural just takes -s or -'s (e.g. Cs or c's for cees).

| Letter | Name | | Name pronunciation | | | | Freq. |
| Letter | Modern English | Latin | Modern English | Latin | Old French | Middle English | Freq. |
|---|---|---|---|---|---|---|---|
| A | a | ā | /ˈeɪ/, /ˈæ/ (Note: Often in Hiberno-English, due to the letter's pronunciation in the Irish language) | /aː/ | /aː/ | /aː/ | 8.17% |
| B | bee | bē | /ˈbiː/ | /beː/ | /beː/ | /beː/ | 1.49% |
| C | cee | cē | /ˈsiː/ | /keː/ | /tʃeː/ > /tseː/ > /seː/ | /seː/ | 2.78% |
| D | dee | dē | /ˈdiː/ | /deː/ | /deː/ | /deː/ | 4.25% |
| E | e | ē | /ˈiː/ | /eː/ | /eː/ | /eː/ | 12.70% |
| F | ef, eff | ef | /ˈɛf/ | /ɛf/ | /ɛf/ | /ɛf/ | 2.23% |
| G | gee | gē | /ˈdʒiː/ | /ɡeː/ | /dʒeː/ | /dʒeː/ | 2.02% |
| H | aitch | hā | /ˈeɪtʃ/ | /haː/ > /ˈaha/ > /ˈakːa/ | /ˈaːtʃə/ | /aːtʃ/ | 6.09% |
| H | haitch (Note: The usual form in Australian English, Hiberno-English and New Zealand English) | hā | /ˈheɪtʃ/ | /haː/ > /ˈaha/ > /ˈakːa/ | /ˈaːtʃə/ | /aːtʃ/ | 6.09% |
| I | i | ī | /ˈaɪ/ | /iː/ | /iː/ | /iː/ | 6.97% |
| J | jay | —N/a | /ˈdʒeɪ/ | —N/a | —N/a | (Note: The letter ⟨J⟩ did not occur in Old French or Middle English. The Modern French name is ji /ʒi/, corresponding to Modern English jy (rhyming with i), which in most areas was later replaced with jay (rhyming with kay).) | 0.15% |
| J | jy (Note: In Scottish English) | —N/a | /ˈdʒaɪ/ | —N/a | —N/a | (Note: The letter ⟨J⟩ did not occur in Old French or Middle English. The Modern French name is ji /ʒi/, corresponding to Modern English jy (rhyming with i), which in most areas was later replaced with jay (rhyming with kay).) | 0.15% |
| K | kay | kā | /ˈkeɪ/ | /kaː/ | /kaː/ | /kaː/ | 0.77% |
| L | el, ell (Note: In the US, an ⟨L⟩-shaped object may be spelled ell.) | el | /ˈɛl/ | /ɛl/ | /ɛl/ | /ɛl/ | 4.03% |
| M | em | em | /ˈɛm/ | /ɛm/ | /ɛm/ | /ɛm/ | 2.41% |
| N | en | en | /ˈɛn/ | /ɛn/ | /ɛn/ | /ɛn/ | 6.75% |
| O | o | ō | /ˈoʊ/ | /oː/ | /oː/ | /oː/ | 7.51% |
| P | pee | pē | /ˈpiː/ | /peː/ | /peː/ | /peː/ | 1.93% |
| Q | cue, kew, kue, que | qū | /ˈkjuː/ | /kuː/ | /kyː/ | /kiw/ | 0.10% |
| R | ar | er | /ˈɑːr/ | /ɛr/ | /ɛr/ | /ɛr/ > /ar/ | 5.99% |
| R | or (Note: In Hiberno-English) | er | /ˈɔːr/ | /ɛr/ | /ɛr/ | /ɛr/ > /ar/ | 5.99% |
| S | ess | es | /ˈɛs/ | /ɛs/ | /ɛs/ | /ɛs/ | 6.33% |
| S | es- (Note: In compounds such as es-hook.) | es | /ˈɛs/ | /ɛs/ | /ɛs/ | /ɛs/ | 6.33% |
| T | tee | tē | /ˈtiː/ | /teː/ | /teː/ | /teː/ | 9.06% |
| U | u | ū | /ˈjuː/ | /uː/ | /yː/ | /iw/ | 2.76% |
| V | vee | —N/a | /ˈviː/ | —N/a | —N/a | —N/a | 0.98% |
| W | double-u | —N/a | /ˈdʌbəl.juː/ (Note: Especially in American English, the /l/ is often not pronounced in informal speech. Common colloquial pronunciations are /ˈdʌbəjuː/, /ˈdʌbəjə/, and /ˈdʌbjə/ (as in the nickname "Dubya") or just /ˈdʌb/, especially in terms like www.) | —N/a | —N/a | —N/a | 2.36% |
| X | ex | ex | /ˈɛks/ | /ɛks/ | /iks/ | /ɛks/ | 0.15% |
| X | ex | ix | /ˈɛks/ | /ɪks/ | /iks/ | /ɛks/ | 0.15% |
| Y | wy, wye | hȳ | /ˈwaɪ/ | /hyː/ | ui, gui ? | /wiː/ | 1.97% |
| Y | wy, wye | hȳ | /ˈwaɪ/ | /iː/ | ui, gui ? | /wiː/ | 1.97% |
| Y | wy, wye | ī graeca | /ˈwaɪ/ | /iː ˈɡraɪka/ | /iː ɡrɛːk/ | /wiː/ | 1.97% |
| Z | zed (Note: In British English, Hiberno-English and Commonwealth English) | zēta | /ˈzɛd/ | /ˈzeːta/ | /ˈzɛːdə/ | /zɛd/ | 0.07% |
| Z | zee (Note: In American English, Newfoundland English and Philippine English) | zēta | /ˈziː/ | /ˈzeːta/ | /ˈzɛːdə/ | /zɛd/ | 0.07% |
| Z | izzard (Note: In Scottish English, archaic elsewhere; historically also spelled uzzard, as seen in the image above.) | zēta | /ˈɪ.zərd/ (Note: A similar form exists in Hong Kong English, pronounced as /iˈzɛd/ or /jiˈzɛd/.) | /ˈzeːta/ | /ˈzɛːdə/ | /zɛd/ | 0.07% |

== Diacritics ==
The most common diacritic marks seen in English publications are the acute (é), grave (è), circumflex (â, î, or ô), tilde (ñ), umlaut and diaeresis (ü or ï – the same symbol is used for two different purposes), and cedilla (ç). Diacritics used for tonal languages may be replaced with tonal numbers or omitted.

=== Loanwords ===
Diacritic marks mainly appear in loanwords such as naïve and façade. Informal English writing tends to omit diacritics because of their absence from the keyboard, while professional copywriters and typesetters tend to include them.

As such words become naturalised in English, there is a tendency to drop the diacritics, as has happened with many older borrowings from French, such as hôtel. Words that are still perceived as foreign tend to retain them; for example, the only spelling of soupçon found in English dictionaries (the Oxford English Dictionary (OED) and others) uses the diacritic. However, diacritics are likely to be retained even in naturalised words where they would otherwise be confused with a common native English word (for example, résumé rather than resume).

=== Native English words ===
Occasionally, especially in older writing, diacritics are used to indicate the syllables of a word: cursed (verb) is pronounced with one syllable, while cursèd (adjective) is pronounced with two. For this, è is used widely in poetry.

Similarly, while in chicken coop the letters -oo- represent a single vowel sound (a digraph), occasionally they may coincide at the junction of two distinct syllables, as in zoölogist and coöperation. This use of the diaeresis is rare but found in some well-known publications, such as MIT Technology Review and The New Yorker. In British English this usage has been considered obsolete for many years and, although it persisted for longer in US English, it is now considered archaic as well. Some publications, particularly in UK usage, have replaced the diaeresis with a hyphen, such as in co-operative.

== Punctuation marks within words ==
=== Apostrophe ===
The apostrophe (', ’) is not usually considered part of the English alphabet nor used as a diacritic, even in loanwords. But it is used for two important purposes in written English: to mark the "possessive" and to mark contracted words. (Note: Linguistic analyses vary on how best to characterise the English possessive morpheme. See article apostrophe for details.) Current standards require its use for both purposes. Therefore, apostrophes are necessary to spell many words even in isolation, unlike most punctuation marks, which are concerned with indicating sentence structure and other relationships among multiple words. (Grammatical rules and 'best practice' vary by time and place, as described comprehensively at the apostrophe article.) In a Chronicle of Higher Education blog, Geoffrey Pullum argued that apostrophe is the 27th letter of the alphabet, arguing that it does not function as a form of punctuation.

=== Hyphen ===
Hyphens are often used in English compound words. Written compound words may be hyphenated, open or closed, so specifics are guided by stylistic policy.

== Frequencies ==
The letter most commonly used in English is E. The least used letter is Z. The frequencies may differ in practice from those shown in the table, according to the type of text.

== Phonology ==
The letters A, E, I, O, and U are considered vowel letters, since (except when silent) they represent vowels, although I and U represent consonants in words such as "onion" and "quail" respectively.

The letter Y sometimes represents a consonant (as in "young") and sometimes a vowel (as in "myth"). Very rarely, W may represent a vowel (as in "cwm", a Welsh loanword).

The consonant sounds represented by the letters W and Y in English (/w/ and /j/ as in went /wɛnt/ and yes /jɛs/) are referred to as semi-vowels (or glides) by linguists; however, this is a description that applies to the sounds represented by the letters and not to the letters themselves. The remaining letters are considered consonant letters, since when not silent they generally represent consonants.

== History ==
=== Old English ===
The English language itself was initially written in the Anglo-Saxon futhorc runic alphabet, in use from the 5th century. This alphabet was brought to what is now England, along with the proto-form of the language itself, by Anglo-Saxon settlers. Very few examples of this form of written Old English have survived, mostly as short inscriptions or fragments.

The Latin script, introduced by Christian missionaries, began to replace the Anglo-Saxon futhorc from about the 7th century, although the two continued in parallel for some time. As such, the Old English alphabet began to employ parts of the Roman alphabet in its construction. Futhorc influenced the emerging English alphabet by providing it with the letters thorn (Þ þ) and wynn (Ƿ ƿ). The letter eth (Ð ð) was later devised as a modification of dee (D d), and finally yogh (Ȝ ȝ) was created by Norman scribes from the insular g in Old English and Irish, and used alongside their Carolingian g.

The a-e ligature ash (Æ æ) was adopted as a letter in its own right, named after a futhorc rune æsc. In very early Old English the o-e ligature ethel (Œ œ) also appeared as a distinct letter, likewise named after a rune, œðel. Additionally, the v–v or u-u ligature double-u (W w) was in use.

In the year 1011, a monk named Byrhtferð recorded the traditional order of the Old English alphabet. He listed the 23 letters of the Latin alphabet first, plus the ampersand, then 5 additional English letters, starting with the Tironian note symbol, ond (⁊, the insular abbreviation for the word and):

A B C D E F G H I K L M N O P Q R S T V X Y Z & ⁊ Ƿ Þ Ð Æ

=== Modern English ===
In the orthography of Modern English, the letters thorn (þ), eth (ð), wynn (ƿ), yogh (ȝ), ash (æ), and ethel (œ) are obsolete. Latin borrowings reintroduced homographs of æ and œ into Middle English and Early Modern English, though they are largely obsolete (see "Ligatures in recent usage" below), and where they are used they are not considered to be separate letters (e.g., for collation purposes), but rather ligatures. Thorn and eth were both replaced by th, though thorn continued in existence for some time, its lowercase form gradually becoming graphically indistinguishable from the minuscule y in most handwriting. Y for th can still be seen in pseudo-archaisms such as "Ye Olde Booke Shoppe". The letters þ and ð are still used in present-day Icelandic (where they now represent two separate sounds, /θ/ and /ð/ having become phonemically-distinct – as indeed also happened in Modern English), while ð is still used in present-day Faroese (although only as a silent letter). Wynn disappeared from English around the 14th century when it was supplanted by uu, which ultimately developed into the modern w. Yogh disappeared around the 15th century and was typically replaced by gh.

The letters u and j, as distinct from v and i, were introduced in the 16th century, and w assumed the status of an independent letter. The variant lowercase form long s (ſ) lasted into early modern English, and was used in non-final position up to the early 19th century. Today, the English alphabet is considered to consist of the following 26 letters:

- A a
- B b
- C c
- D d
- E e
- F f
- G g
- H h
- I i
- J j
- K k
- L l
- M m
- N n
- O o
- P p
- Q q
- R r
- S s
- T t
- U u
- V v
- W w
- X x
- Y y
- Z z

Written English has a number of digraphs, but they are not considered separate letters of the alphabet:

- ch (usually /t͡ʃ/)
- ck (/k/)
- gh (/f/, /g/ or /∅/)
- ng (/ŋ/)
- ph (/f/)
- qu (/kw/)
- sh (/ʃ/)
- th (/θ/ or /ð/)
- wh (/ʍ/ or /w/)
- zh (/ʒ/)

=== Ligatures in recent usage ===
The ligatures of Adobe Caslon Pro

Outside of professional papers on specific subjects that traditionally use ligatures in loanwords, ligatures are seldom used in modern English. The ligatures æ and œ were until the 19th century (slightly later in American English) used in formal writing for certain words of Greek or Latin origin, such as encyclopædia and cœlom, although such ligatures were not used in either classical Latin or ancient Greek. These are now usually rendered as "ae" and "oe" in all types of writing, although in American English, a lone e has mostly supplanted both (for example, encyclopedia for encyclopaedia, and maneuver for manoeuvre).

Some typefaces used to typeset English texts contain commonly used ligatures, such as for ⟨tt⟩, ⟨fi⟩, ⟨fl⟩, ⟨ffi⟩, and ⟨ffl⟩. These are not independent letters – although in traditional typesetting, each of these ligatures would have its own sort (type element) for practical reasons – but simply type design choices created to optimize the legibility of the text.

== Proposed reforms ==
There have been a number of proposals to extend or replace the basic English alphabet. These include proposals for the addition of letters to the English alphabet, such as eng or engma (Ŋ ŋ), used to replace the digraph "ng" and represent the voiced velar nasal sound with a single letter. Benjamin Franklin's phonetic alphabet, based on the Latin alphabet, introduced a number of new letters as part of a wider proposal to reform English orthography. Other proposals have gone further, proposing entirely new scripts for written English to replace the Latin alphabet such as the Deseret alphabet and the Shavian alphabet.

== See also ==
- Alphabet song – Song that teaches an alphabet
- NATO phonetic alphabet – Spoken alphabet for radio communication
- English orthography – Norms for writing the English language
- English-language spelling reform – Proposals to phoneticise English spelling
- American manual alphabet – Manual alphabet that augments the vocabulary of American Sign Language
- Two-handed manual alphabets – Part of a deaf sign language
- English Braille – Tactile writing system for English
- American Braille
- New York Point – Tactile alphabet invented by William Bell Wait
- Chinese respelling of the English alphabet – Chinese pronunciation of the English alphabet
- Burmese respelling of the English alphabet – Burmese Transcription
- Base36 – Encoding for a sequence of byte values using 36 printable characters
- Initial teaching alphabet – Aid for teaching English reading

== Notes and references ==
=== Further reading ===
- Michael Rosen (2015). Alphabetical: How Every Letter Tells a Story. Counterpoint. ISBN 978-1619027022.
- Upward, Christopher; Davidson, George (2011), The History of English Spelling, Oxford: Wiley-Blackwell, ISBN 978-1-4051-9024-4, LCCN 2011008794.
