= Burmese alphabet =

Abugida used for writing Burmese

Burmese မြန်မာအက္ခရာ
- Script type: Abugida
- Period: c. 984 or 1035–present
- Direction: Left-to-right
- Official script: Myanmar
- Languages: Burmese, Rakhine, Pali and Sanskrit

Related scripts
- Parent systems: Egyptian: Proto-Sinaitic; Phoenician; Aramaic; Brahmi script; Tamil-Brahmi; Kadamba or Pallava script; Pyu or Old Mon; Mon–Burmese script; Burmese

ISO 15924
- ISO 15924: Mymr (350), Myanmar (Burmese)

Unicode
- Unicode alias: Myanmar
- Unicode range: U+1000–U+104F

The Burmese alphabet (Burmese: မြန်မာအက္ခရာ, MLCTS: mranma akkhara, pronounced [mjəmà ʔɛʔkʰəjà]) is an abugida used for writing Burmese, based on the Mon–Burmese script. It is ultimately adapted from a Brahmic script, either the Kadamba or Pallava alphabet of South India. The Burmese alphabet is also used for the liturgical languages of Pali and Sanskrit. In recent decades, other, related alphabets, such as Shan and modern Mon, have been restructured according to the standard of the Burmese alphabet (see Mon–Burmese script). Burmese orthography is deep, with an indirect spelling-sound correspondence between graphemes (letters) and phonemes (sounds), due to its long and conservative written history and voicing rules.

Burmese is written from left to right and requires no spaces between words, although modern writing usually contains spaces after each clause to enhance readability and to avoid grammatical complications. There are several systems of transliteration into the Latin alphabet; for this article, the MLC Transcription System is used.

The rounded and even circular shapes dominating the script are thought to be due to the historical writing material, palm leaves, drawing straight lines on which can tear the surface.

== History ==
=== History ===
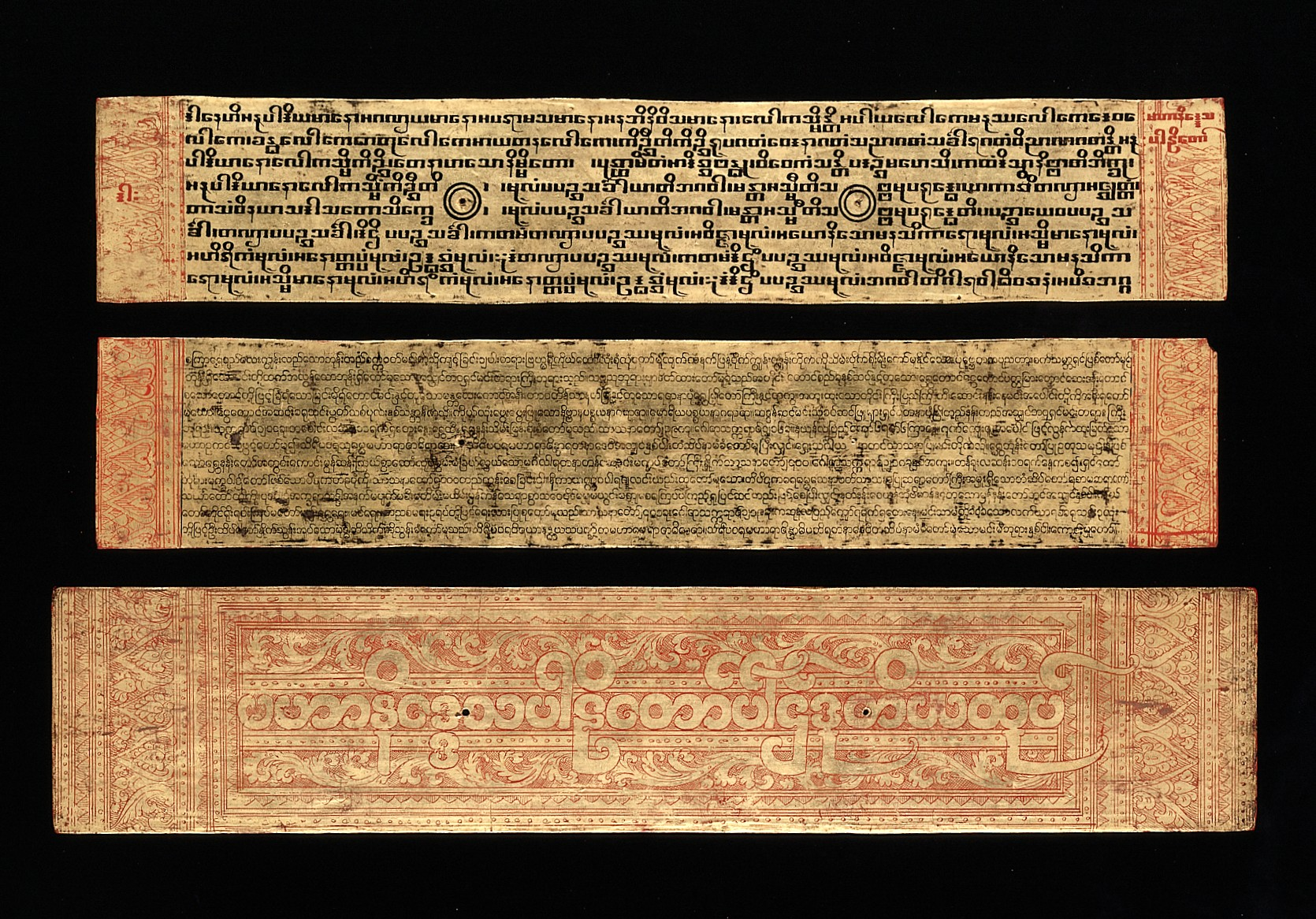
A Pali manuscript of the Buddhist text Mahaniddesa showing three different styles of the Burmese alphabet, (top) medium square, (centre) round and (bottom) outline round in red lacquer from the inside of one of the gilded covers

The Burmese alphabet was derived from the Pyu script, the Old Mon script, or directly from a South Indian script, either the Kadamba or Pallava alphabet. The earliest evidence of the Burmese alphabet is dated to 1035, while a casting made in the 18th century of an old stone inscription points to 984. Burmese calligraphy originally followed a square format, as petroglyphs were a primary writing medium in Old Burmese.

The medial diacritic la hswe (လဆွဲ) was used in old Burmese from the Bagan to Innwa periods (12th century – 16th century), and could be combined with other diacritics (ya pin, ha hto and wa hswe) to form ⟨◌္လျ⟩ ⟨◌္လွ⟩ ⟨◌္လှ⟩. Similarly, until the Innwa period, ya pin was also combined with ya yit to form ⟨◌ျြ⟩. During the early Bagan period, the rhyme /ɛ́/, now represented with the diacritic ⟨◌ဲ⟩ was represented with ⟨◌ါယ်⟩.

The transition to Middle Burmese in the 16th century included phonological changes (e.g., mergers of sound pairs that were distinct in Old Burmese) that were accompanied by changes in the underlying orthography. The high tone marker ⟨း⟩ was introduced in the 16th century (the high tone was previously indicated with ဟ်). Moreover, ⟨အ်⟩, which disappeared by the 16th century, was subscripted to represent the creaky tone (it is now indicated with ⟨◌့⟩). The diacritic combination ⟨◌ိုဝ်⟩ disappeared in the mid-1750s, having been replaced with the ⟨◌ို⟩ combination, introduced in 1638. The rounded cursive format of Burmese took hold from the 17th century when popular writing led to the wider use of palm leaves and folded paper known as parabaiks. A stylus would rip these leaves when making straight lines.

The standard tone markings found in modern Burmese can be traced to the 19th century. During this time, ⟨◌ော်⟩ replaced ⟨ဝ်⟩ to indicate the rhyme /ɔ̀/. From the 19th century onward, orthographers created spellers to reform Burmese spelling, because of ambiguities that arose over transcribing sounds that had been merged. British rule saw continued efforts to standardize Burmese spelling through dictionaries and spellers.

In August 1963, the socialist Union Revolutionary Government established the Literary and Translation Commission (the immediate precursor of the Myanmar Language Commission) to standardize Burmese spelling, diction, composition, and terminology. The latest spelling authority, named the Myanma Salonpaung Thatpon Kyan (မြန်မာ စာလုံးပေါင်း သတ်ပုံ ကျမ်း), was compiled in 1978 by the commission.

== Alphabet ==
=== Arrangement ===
As with other Brahmic scripts, the Burmese alphabet is traditionally arranged into groups called wet (ဝဂ်, from Pali vagga), each consisting of five letters for stop consonants based on articulation. Within each group:

- the first letter is tenuis and unaspirated (သိထိလ, from Pali sithila),
- the second is the aspirated homologue (ဓနိတ, from Pali dhanita),
- the third and fourth are the voiced homologues (လဟု, from Pali lahu), and
- the fifth is the nasal homologue (နိဂ္ဂဟိတ, from Pali niggahita).

This is true of the first twenty-five letters in the Burmese alphabet, which are called grouped together as wek byi (ဝဂ်ဗျည်း, from Pali vagga byañjana), based on articulation:

- The first group of letters, called ka wet (ကဝဂ်), are velars (ကဏ္ဍဇ, from Pali kaṇḍaja),
- the second group of letters, called sa wet (စဝဂ်) are palatals (တာလုဇ, from Pali tāluja),
- the third group of letters, called ta wet (ဋဝဂ်) are alveolars (မုဒ္ဓဇ, from Pali muddhaja),
- the fourth group of letters, called ta wet (တဝဂ်) are classified as dentals (ဒန္တဇ, from Pali dantaja) but pronounced as alveolars, and
- the fifth group of letters, called pa wet (ပဝဂ်) are labials (ဩဋ္ဌဇ, from Pali oṭṭhaja)

The remaining eight letters ⟨ယ⟩, ⟨ရ⟩, ⟨လ⟩, ⟨ဝ⟩, ⟨သ⟩, ⟨ဟ⟩, ⟨ဠ⟩, ⟨အ⟩ are grouped together as a-wek (အဝဂ်, Pali avagga, lit. 'without group'), as they are not arranged according to phonemic principles.

=== Consonant letters ===
The Burmese alphabet has 33 letters to indicate the initial consonant of a syllable and four diacritics to indicate additional consonants in the onset. Like other abugidas, including the other members of the Brahmic family, each consonant has an inherent vowel /a̰/ (often reduced to /ə/), while other vowels are indicated by diacritics, which are placed above, below, before or after the consonant character.

The following table provides the letter, the syllable onset in IPA and as transcription in MLC, and the letter's name in Burmese (which may describe the letter's form or is simply sound of the letter), arranged in the traditional order:

| က k IPA: /k/ ကကြီး [ka̰ dʑí] | ခ kh IPA: /kʰ/ ခခွေး [kʰa̰ ɡwé] | ဂ g IPA: /g/ ဂငယ် [ɡa̰ ŋɛ̀] | ဃ gh IPA: /g/ ဃကြီး [ɡa̰ dʑí] | င ng IPA: /ŋ/ င [ŋa̰] |
| စ c IPA: /s/ စလုံး [sa̰ lóʊɰ̃] | ဆ ch IPA: /sʰ/ ဆလိမ် [sʰa̰ lèɪɰ̃] | ဇ j IPA: /z/ ဇကွဲ [za̰ ɡwɛ́] | ဈ jh IPA: /z/ ဈမျဉ်းဆွဲ [za̰ mjɪ̀ɰ̃ zwɛ́] | ည ny IPA: /ɲ/ ညကြီး [ɲa̰ dʑí] |
| ဋ ṭ IPA: /ʈ/ ဋသန်လျင်းချိတ် [ta̰ təlɪ́ɰ̃ dʑeɪʔ] | ဌ ṭh IPA: /ʈʰ/ ဌဝမ်းဘဲ [tʰa̰ wʊ́ɰ̃ bɛ́] | ဍ ḍ IPA: /ɖ/ ဍရင်ကောက် [da̰ jɪ̀ɰ̃ ɡaʊʔ] | ဎ ḍh IPA: /ɖʰ/ ဎရေမှုတ် [da̰ jè m̥oʊʔ] | ဏ ṇ IPA: /ɳ/ ဏကြီး [na̰ dʑí] |
| တ t IPA: /t/ တဝမ်းပူ [ta̰ wʊ́ɰ̃ bù] | ထ th IPA: /tʰ/ ထဆင်ထူး [tʰa̰ sʰɪ̀ɰ̃ dú] | ဒ d IPA: /d/ ဒထွေး [da̰ dwé] | ဓ dh IPA: /dʰ/ ဓအောက်ခြိုက် [da̰ ʔaʊʔ tɕʰaɪʔ] | န n IPA: /n/ နငယ် [na̰ ŋɛ̀] |
| ပ p IPA: /p/ ပစောက် [pa̰ zaʊʔ] | ဖ ph IPA: /pʰ/ ဖဦးထုပ် [pʰa̰ ʔóʊʔ tʰoʊʔ] | ဗ b IPA: /b/ ဗထက်ခြိုက် [ba̰ tɛʔ tɕʰaɪʔ] | ဘ bh IPA: /b/ ဘကုန်း [ba̰ ɡóʊɰ̃] | မ m IPA: /m/ မ [ma̰] |
| ယ y IPA: /j/ ယပက်လက် [ja̰ pɛʔ lɛʔ] | ရ r IPA: /j/ ရကောက်‌ [ja̰ ɡaʊʔ] | လ l IPA: /l/ လငယ် [la̰ ŋɛ̀] | ဝ w IPA: /w/ ဝ‌ [wa̰] | သ s IPA: /θ/ သ‌ [θa̰] |
| | ဟ h IPA: /h/ ဟ‌ [ha̰] | ဠ ḷ IPA: /l/ ဠကြီး [la̰ dʑí] | အ a IPA: /ʔ/ အ [ʔa̰] | |

- ⟨ဃ⟩ (gh), ⟨ဈ⟩ (jh), ⟨ဋ⟩ (ṭ), ⟨ဌ⟩ (ṭh), ⟨ဍ⟩ (ḍ), ⟨ဎ⟩ (ḍh), ⟨ဏ⟩ (ṇ), ⟨ဓ⟩ (dh), ⟨ဘ⟩ (bh), and ⟨ဠ⟩ (ḷ) are used primarily in words of Indic origin (Pali and Sanskrit).
- ⟨ည⟩ has an alternate form ⟨ဉ⟩ (called ညကလေး), which is used with the vowel diacritic ⟨ာ⟩ as a syllable onset and alone as a final, primarily in words of Indic origin (Pali and Sanskrit).
- ⟨န⟩ (n) uses a shortened form in combination with a subscripted diacritic like ⟨နု⟩ (nu.)
- ⟨ရ⟩ is often pronounced [ɹ] in words of Indic or foreign origin (e.g., Pali, English).
- ⟨ၐ⟩ (ś) and ⟨ၑ⟩ (ṣ), both pronounced /ɕ/, are used exclusively in academic works to transcribe Sanskrit words. The consonants merged to ⟨သ⟩ (s) in Pali.
- ⟨အ⟩ is nominally treated as a consonant in the Burmese alphabet; it represents an initial glottal stop in syllables with no other consonant.
- ⟨ၒ⟩ (r̥) and ⟨ၓ⟩ (r̥̄) are used exclusively in academic works to transcribe Sanskrit words.
- ⟨ၔ⟩ (ḷ) and ⟨ၕ⟩ (ḹ) are used exclusively in academic works to transcribe Sanskrit words.

=== Vowel letters ===
Burmese also has seven letters to indicate independent vowels; these are used primarily when spelling words of Pali or Sanskrit etymology:

| Letter | ဣ i. IPA: /ʔḭ/ | ဤ i IPA: /ʔì/ | ဥ u. IPA: /ʔṵ/ | ဦ u IPA: /ʔù/ | ဧ e IPA: /ʔè/ | ဩ au: IPA: /ʔɔ́/ | ဪ au IPA: /ʔɔ̀/ |
| Equivalent | အိ | အီ | အု | အူ | အေ | အော | အော် |

=== Consonant stacking ===
Burmese uses stacked consonants called hna-lon-zin (နှစ်လုံးဆင့်), whereby specific two-letter combinations can be written one atop the other, or stacked — the first consonant letter is written normally (i.e., not super- or subscripted), while the second is stacked underneath the first one. Consonant stacking has an implied virama ⟨◌်⟩, thus suppressing the inherent vowel of the first letter. For instance, 'world' ⟨ကမ္ဘာ⟩ is read ⟨ကမ်ဘာ⟩ (kambha), not ⟨ကမဘာ⟩ kamabha).

Stacked consonants are largely used in loan words from Indic languages like Pali, Sanskrit, and occasionally English. For instance, the Burmese word for 'self' (via Pali atta) is spelt ⟨အတ္တ⟩, not ⟨အတ်တ⟩, although both are pronounced identically. Stacked consonants are generally not found in native Burmese words, except as informal abbreviations. For example, the word ⟨သမီး⟩ ('daughter') is sometimes abbreviated to ⟨သ္မီး⟩, even though the stacked consonants do not belong to the same row in the ⟨ဝဂ်⟩ and a vowel is pronounced between. Similarly, ⟨လက်ဖက်⟩ 'tea' is commonly abbreviated as ⟨လ္ဘက်⟩.

Stacked consonants are always homorganic (pronounced in the same place in the mouth), which is indicated by the traditional arrangement of the Burmese alphabet into the seven five-letter groups of letters (called wet or ဝဂ်). Consonants not found in the rows beginning with ⟨က⟩ ⟨စ⟩ ⟨ဋ⟩ ⟨တ⟩ or ⟨ပ⟩ can only be doubled — that is, stacked with themselves. The combination of -ss- is written ⟨ဿ⟩, instead of ⟨သ္သ⟩.

| Group | Possible combinations | | | | | | | | | Example |
|---|---|---|---|---|---|---|---|---|---|---|
| Ka wet | က္က kk | က္ခ kkh | ဂ္ဂ gg | ဂ္ဃ ggh | | | | | | dukkha. (ဒုက္ခ) 'suffering' |
| Sa wet | စ္စ cc | စ္ဆ cch | ဇ္ဇ jj | ဇ္ဈ jjh | ဉ္စ nyc | ဉ္ဆ nych | ဉ္ဇ nyj | ဉ္ဈ nyjh | | wijja (ဝိဇ္ဇာ) 'knowledge' |
| Ta wet | ဋ္ဋ ṭṭ | ဋ္ဌ ṭṭh | ဍ္ဍ ḍḍ | ဍ္ဎ ḍḍh | ဏ္ဋ ṇṭ | ဏ္ဌ ṇṭh | ဏ္ဍ ṇḍ | ဏ္ဎ ṇḍh | ဏ္ဏ ṇṇ | kanda. (ကဏ္ဍ) 'section' |
| Ta wet | တ္တ tt | တ္ထ tth | ဒ္ဒ dd | ဒ္ဓ ddh | န္တ nt | န္ထ nth | န္ဒ nd | န္ဓ ndh | န္န nn | sadda (သဒ္ဒါ) 'grammar' |
| Pa wet | ပ္ပ pp | ပ္ဖ pph | ဗ္ဗ bb | ဗ္ဘ bbh | မ္ပ mp | မ္ဖ mph | မ္ဗ mb | မ္ဘ mbh | မ္မ mm | kambha (ကမ္ဘာ) 'world' |
| A-wet | ဿ ss | လ္လ ll | ဠ္ဠ ḷḷ | | | | | | | pissa (ပိဿာ) 'viss' |

=== Stroke order ===
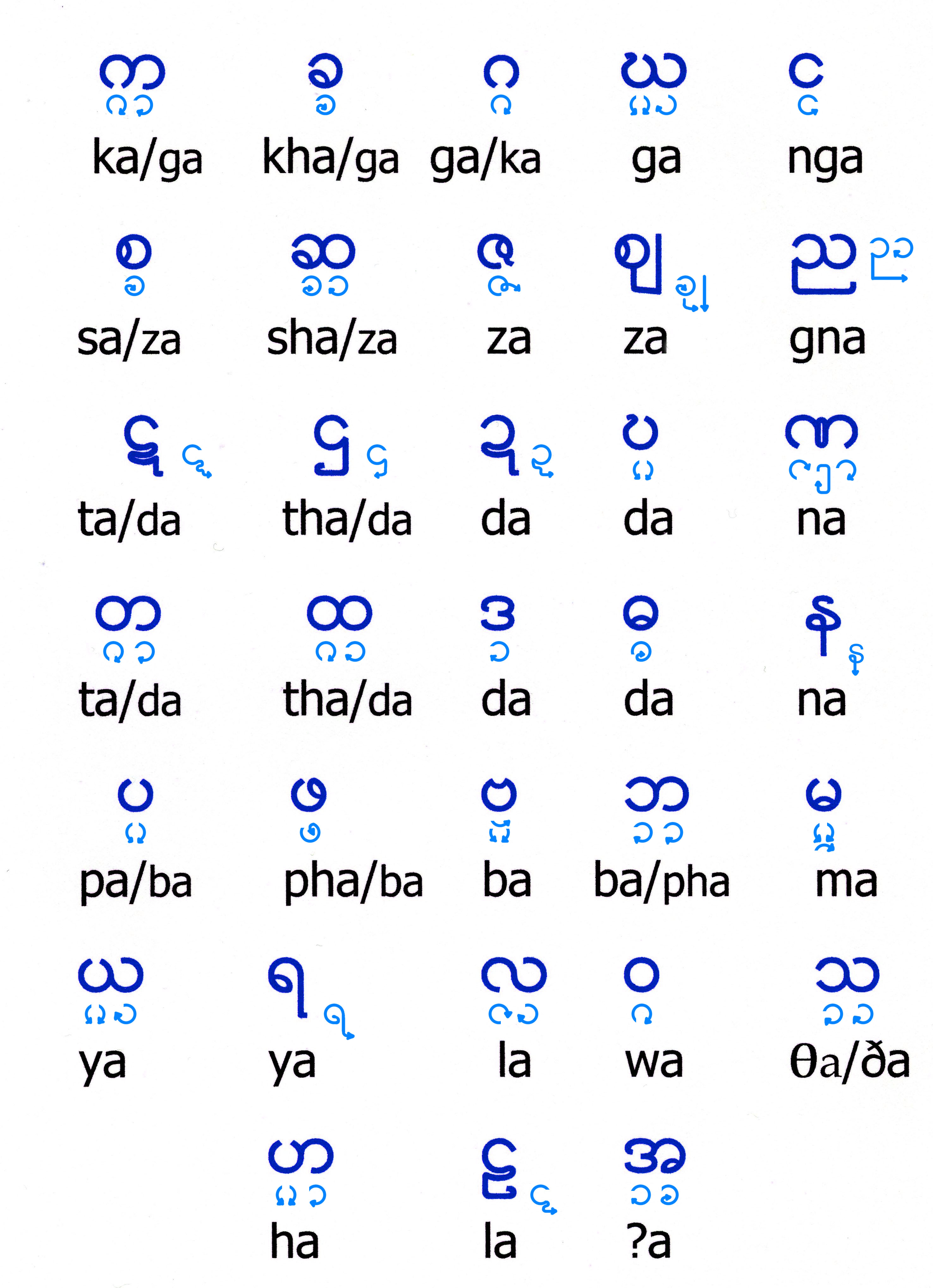
Stroke order and direction of Burmese consonants

Burmese letters are written with a specific stroke order. The letter forms are based on circles. Typically, one circle should be done with one stroke, and all circles are written clockwise. Exceptions are mostly letters with an opening on top. The circle of these letters is written with two strokes coming from opposite directions.

The ten following letters are exceptions to the clockwise rule: ⟨ပ⟩, ⟨ဖ⟩, ⟨ဗ⟩, ⟨မ⟩, ⟨ယ⟩, ⟨လ⟩, ⟨ဟ⟩, ⟨ဃ⟩, ⟨ဎ⟩, ⟨ဏ⟩. Some versions of stroke order may be slightly different.

The Burmese stroke order can be learned from ⟨ပထမတန်း မြန်မာဖတ်စာ ၂၀၁၇-၂၀၁၈⟩ (Burmese Grade 1, 2017-2018), a textbook published by the Burmese Ministry of Education. The book is available under the LearnBig project of UNESCO. Other resources include the Center for Southeast Asian Studies, Northern Illinois University and an online learning resource published by the Ministry of Education, Taiwan.

== Diacritics ==
Burmese employs numerous combinations of diacritics to mark medial consonants, vowels and tones.

=== Medial diacritics ===
Burmese has 5 medial diacritics. Consonant letters may be modified by up to three medial diacritics at a time, to indicate additional consonants before the vowel. These diacritics are:

| Diacritic | Name | Usage |
|---|---|---|
| ျ -y- IPA: /j/ | ya pin (ယပင့်) | Indicates medial /j/ or palatalization of velar consonants such as /c/, /cʱ/, /ɟ/, /ɲ/. |
| ြ -r- IPA: /j/ | ya yit (ရရစ်) | Functions similarly to ⟨ျ⟩; also indicates medial /j/ or palatalization of velars. |
| ွ -w- IPA: /w/ | wa hswe (ဝဆွဲ) | Indicates medial /w/ in open syllables, or /ʊ̀/ ~ /wà/ in closed syllables. May combine with vowel marks (⟨ေ⟩, ⟨ွ⟩, ⟨ာ⟩, etc.) to add /w/ before the vowel. Rarely used in ⟨◌ွိုင်⟩, ⟨◌ွိုက်⟩ to represent English /ɔɪ/. |
| ှ h- IPA: /ʰ/ | ha hto (ဟထိုး) | Indicates voicelessness of a sonorant consonant. |
| ္လ -l- IPA: /l/ | la hswe (လဆွဲ) | Represents a medial /l/ in a few conservative dialects; now obsolete in standard Burmese. |

All of the possible medial diacritic combinations are listed below, using ⟨မ⟩ [m] as a sample letter:

| Diacritic | Base medial | with -h- | with -w- | with -h- + -w- |
|---|---|---|---|---|
| ျ -y- IPA: /j/ | မျ my IPA: [mj] (Note: Generally used only on the bilabial and velar consonants ⟨က⟩ ⟨ခ⟩ ⟨ဂ⟩ ⟨ဃ⟩ ⟨င⟩ ⟨ပ⟩ ⟨ဖ⟩ ⟨ဗ⟩ ⟨ဘ⟩ ⟨မ⟩ and additionally ⟨လ⟩.) (Note: Palatalizes velar consonants: ⟨ကျ⟩ (ky), ⟨ချ⟩ (hky), ⟨ဂျ⟩ (gy) are pronounced [tɕ], [tɕʰ], [dʑ], while ⟨ကြ⟩ (kr), ⟨ခြ⟩ (hkr), ⟨ဂြ⟩ (gr), ⟨ငြ⟩ (ngr), ⟨ငြှ⟩ (hngr) are pronounced [tɕ], [tɕʰ], [dʑ], [ɲ], [ɲ̊].) | မျှ hmy IPA: [m̥j] (Note: ⟨သျှ⟩ (hsy) and ⟨လျှ⟩ (hly) are pronounced [ʃ] in Standard Burmese.) | မျွ myw IPA: [mw] | မျွှ hmyw IPA: [m̥w] |
| ြ -r- IPA: /j/ | မြ mr IPA: [mj] (Note: In Pali and Sanskrit loanwords, the medial can be used for nonbilabial and velar consonants as well, e.g., ⟨ဣန္ဒြေ⟩ (indre, 'modesty')) | မြှ hmr IPA: [m̥j] | မြွ mrw IPA: [mw] | မြွှ hmrw IPA: [m̥w] |
| ွ -w- IPA: /w/ | မွ mw IPA: [mw] | | | မွှ hmw IPA: [m̥w] |
| ှ h- IPA: /ʰ/ | မှ hm IPA: [m̥] (Note: Used only in ⟨ငှ⟩ (hng) [ŋ̊], ⟨ညှ/ဉှ⟩ (hny) [ɲ̥], ⟨နှ⟩ (hn) [n̥], ⟨မှ⟩ (hm) [m̥], လှ (hl) [l̥]. ⟨ဝှ⟩ (hw) is pronounced as [ʍ], [kʰw], [ɡw] or [pʰw]. ⟨ယှ⟩ (hy) and ⟨ရှ⟩ (hr) are pronounced [ʃ].) | | | |

=== Tone and vowel diacritics ===
Burmese has several vowel diacritics that also indicate an inherent tone:

| Diacritic | Name(s) | Usage |
|---|---|---|
| ◌့. | အောက်မြစ် | Creates creaky tone. Used only with nasal finals or vowels which inherently indicate a low or high tone. |
| ◌း : | ဝစ္စပေါက်, ဝိသဇ္ဇနီ, ရှေ့ကပေါက်, ရှေ့ဆီး | Visarga; creates high tone. Can follow a nasal final marked with virama, or a vowel which inherently implies creaky tone or low tone. |
| ◌ာ - | ရေးချ, မောက်ချ, ဝိုက်ချ | When used alone, it indicates /à/. Generically referred to as ⟨ရေးချ⟩ /jéːtʃʰa̰/, this diacritic takes two distinct forms (see row below). By default, it is written ⟨◌ာ⟩ which is called ⟨ဝိုက်ချ⟩ /waɪʔtʃʰa̰/ for specificity. Although typically not permissible in closed syllables, solitary ◌ာ or ◌ါ can be found in some words of Pali origin such as ဓာတ် (essence, element) or မာန် (pride). |
| ◌ါ - | မောက်ချ | When used alone, it indicates /à/. It is used when combined with the consonants ခ ဂ င ဒ ပ ဝ, it is written tall as ◌ါ and called ⟨မောက်ချ⟩ /maʊʔtʃʰa̰/, to disambiguate similarly looking letters. |
| ◌ေ - | သဝေထိုး | Indicates /è/. Generally only permissible in open syllables, but occasionally found in closed syllables in loan words such as ⟨မေတ္တာ⟩ (metta). |
| ◌ော aw: | – | A combination of ⟨◌ေ⟩ and ⟨◌ာ⟩ or ⟨◌ါ⟩. Indicates /ɔ́/ in open syllables or /àʊ/ before ⟨က⟩ or ⟨င⟩. The low-tone variant of this vowel in open syllables is written ⟨◌ော်⟩ or ⟨◌ါ်⟩. |
| ◌ေါ် aw | | used to denote ⟨◌ော်⟩ in some letters to avoid confusion for ⟨က, တ, ဘ, ဟ, အ⟩. |
| ◌ဲ e: | နောက်ပစ် | Indicates /ɛ́/. Only found in open syllables. |
| ◌ု u. | တစ်ချောင်းငင် | When used alone, indicates /ṵ/ in open syllables or /ɔ̀ʊ/ in closed syllables. |
| ◌ူ u | နှစ်ချောင်းငင် | Indicates /ù/. Only found in open syllables. |
| ◌ိ i. | လုံးကြီးတင် | Indicates /ḭ/ in open syllables, or /èɪ/ in closed syllables. |
| ◌ီ i | လုံးကြီးတင်ဆံခတ် | Indicates /ì/. Only found in open syllables. |
| ◌ို ui | – | Indicates /ò/ in open syllables, or /aɪ/ before ⟨က⟩ or ⟨င⟩. A combination of the ⟨◌ိ⟩ i and ⟨◌ု⟩ u vowel diacritics. |

=== Final diacritics ===
Burmese finals are indicated by the following diacritics:

| Letter | Name(s) | Usage |
|---|---|---|
| ် IPA: /-ʔ/ | အသတ်, တံခွန်, ရှေ့ထိုး | Virama; this mark is called asat in Burmese (Burmese: အသတ်, MLCTS: a.sat, [ʔa̰θaʔ]), meaning "nonexistence." It deletes the inherent vowel, creating a final consonant. Common after ⟨က င စ ည (ဉ) ဏ တ န ပ မ⟩; also found in loanwords. Used as a marginal tone mark: e.g., ⟨ယ်⟩, ⟨◌ော်⟩, ⟨◌ေါ်⟩ (low-tone variants of ⟨ယ⟩, ⟨◌ော⟩, and ⟨◌ေါ⟩). In this role, it's called ⟨ရှေ့ထိုး⟩ /ʃḛtʰó/. |
| င်္ -ng IPA: /-ɪɰ̃/ | ကင်းစီး | Superscripted form of ⟨င်⟩ representing nasalization ([ìɰ̃]) as final. Found mainly in Pali and Sanskrit loanwords (e.g., အင်္ဂါ not အင်ဂါ). |
| ံ -n IPA: /-ɰ̃/ | သေးသေးတင် | Anusvara; marks a homorganic nasal in multisyllabic words, or a final -m that changes the vowel and implies a low tone. May occur with tone markers for high or creaky tone. Often appears with ⟨◌ု⟩, ⟨◌ွ⟩, or ⟨◌ိ⟩. Common combinations include ⟨ုံ့⟩, ⟨ုံ⟩, and ⟨ုံ့း⟩, with rhymes /o̰ʊɰ̃ òʊɰ̃ óʊɰ̃/ respectively. |

== Orthography ==
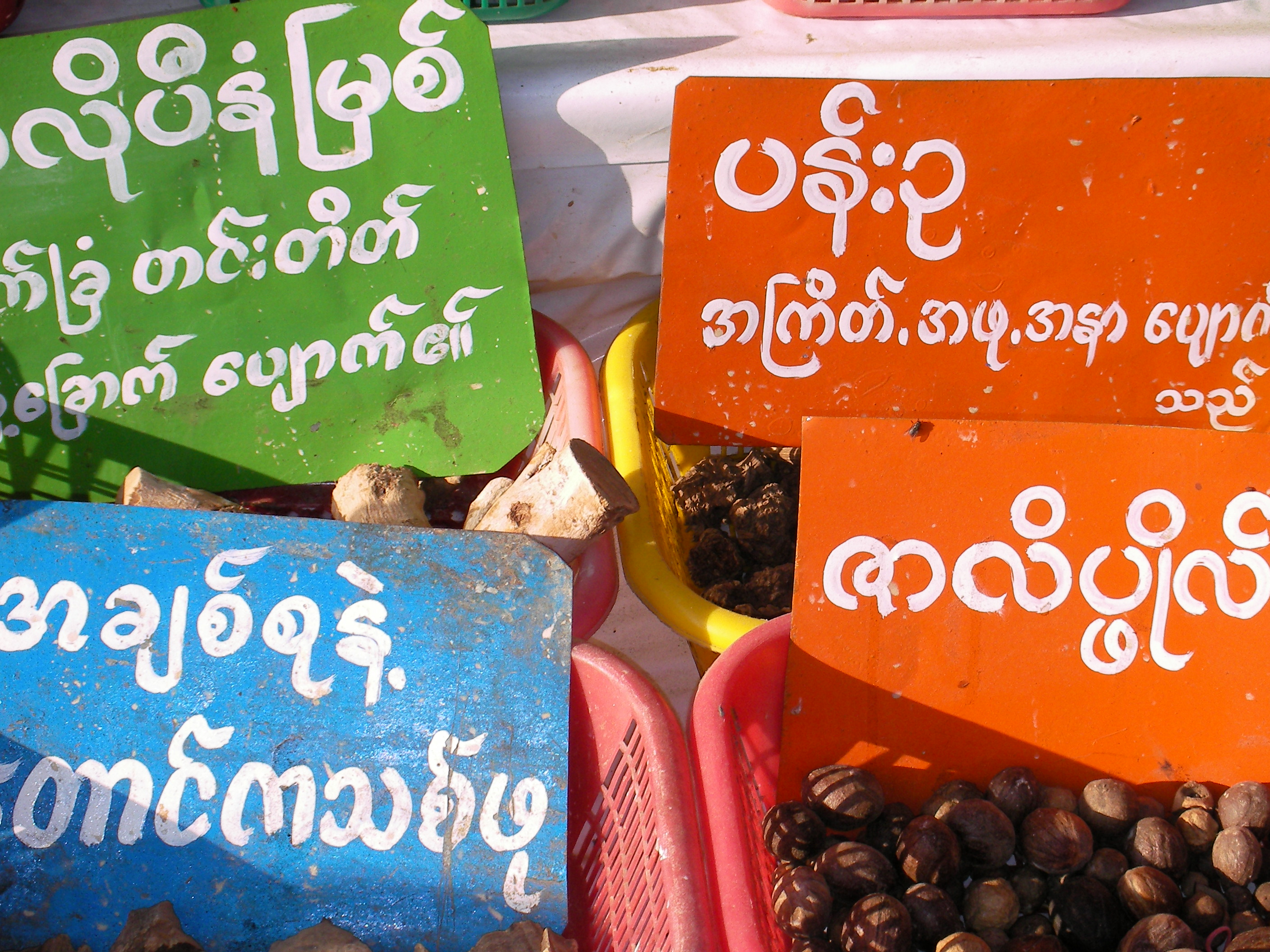
Sampling of various Burmese script styles

Burmese has a deep orthography, with a one-to-many relationship between phonemes and graphemes. While the pronunciation can be deduced for the majority of words, many Burmese words have spellings with irregular pronunciations, especially words of Indic and foreign etymology. Several phonemic changes, including vowel weakening and voicing of consonants (e.g., in compound words) is not transcribed. An example is the words 'to link' ([tɕʰeɪʔ]) and 'hook' ([dʑeɪʔ]), both of which are spelt ⟨ချိတ်⟩.

Burmese orthography remains conservative, with spellings that preserve rhymes and consonants that have since merged. Due to its conservatism, Burmese spellings have been used to reconstruct earlier stages of the Burmese language and in Tibeto-Burman historical linguistics. Since the earliest stages of the language, Burmese has assimilated thousands of Indic words, especially from the classical languages of Pali and Sanskrit. These borrowings can be deduced from orthography, with later borrowings adopting more orthographically transparent loans. Examples include words like ⟨သဘော⟩ (sa.bhau, 'disposition') and ⟨သဘာဝ⟩ (sa.bhava., 'nature'), both from Pali sabhāva.

Burmese orthography has preserved all the nasalized finals [-n, -m, -ŋ], which have merged to [-ɰ̃] in spoken Burmese. Similarly, Burmese orthography has preserved the consonantal finals [-s, -p, -t, -k], which have since been reduced to [-ʔ]. Burmese has retained a number of phonetically redundant graphemes ( used primarily in words of Indic etymology; phoneme when word is voiced), including separate letters that are used to spell words of Indic origin:

| Phoneme | Grapheme | | | |
|---|---|---|---|---|
| /tɕ/ | ကျ ky | ကြ kr | | |
| /tɕʰ/ | ချ hky | ခြ hkr | | |
| /ɡ/ | က k | ခ hk | ဂ g | ဃ gh |
| /dʑ/ | ကျ ky | ကြ kr | ချ hky | ခြ hkr |
| /dʑ/ | ဂျ gy | ဂြ gr | ဃျ ghy | ဃြ ghr |
| /z/ | စ c | ဆ hc | ဇ j | ဈ jh |
| /ɲ/ | ည ny | ဉ ny | | |
| /ɲ̥/ | ညှ hny | ဉှ hny | | |
| /t/ | ဋ t | တ t | | |
| /tʰ/ | ဌ ht | ထ ht | | |
| /d/ | ဋ t | တ t | ဌ ht | ထ ht |
| /d/ | ဒ d | ဓ dh | | |
| /n/ | ဏ n | န n | | |
| /n̥/ | ဏှ hn | နှ hn | | |
| /b/ | ပ p | ဖ hp | ဗ b | ဘ bh |
| /j/ | ယ y | ရ r | | |
| /ʃ/ | ယှ hy | ရှ hr | သျှ hsy | လျှ hly |
| /l/ | လ l | ဠ l | | |
| /l̥/ | လှ hl | ဠှ hl | | |

| Phoneme | Grapheme | |
|---|---|---|
| /ʔḭ/ | ဣ i. | အိ i. |
| /ʔì/ | ဤ i | အီ i |
| /ʔṵ/ | ဥ u. | အု u. |
| /ʔù/ | ဦ u | အူ u |
| /ʔè/ | ဧ e | အေ e |
| /ʔɔ́/ | ဩ au. | အော au. |
| /ʔɔ̀/ | ဪ au | အော် au |

== Syllable rhymes ==
The following lists all the permissible syllable rhymes (i.e., vowels and any consonants that may follow them within the same syllable) and their spellings (graphemes); these rhymes are written using a combination of diacritic marks and consonant letters.

=== Open syllables ===
Below are the possible combinations of open syllable rhymes in Burmese spelling, used with the letter ⟨က⟩ [k] as a sample. [a̰] is the inherent vowel, and is not indicated by any diacritic. In theory, virtually any written syllable that is not the final syllable of a word can be pronounced with the vowel [ə] (with no tone and no syllable-final [-ʔ] or [-ɰ̃]) as its rhyme. In practice, the bare consonant letter alone is the most common way of spelling syllables whose rhyme is [ə].

| Vowel | Creaky tone | | Low tone | | High tone | |
| Vowel | Phoneme | Grapheme | Phoneme | Grapheme | Phoneme | Grapheme |
|---|---|---|---|---|---|---|
| /a/ | [ka̰] | က ka. | [kà] | ကာ ka | [ká] | ကား ka: |
| /ɛ/ | [kɛ̰] | ကဲ့ kai. | [kɛ̀] | ကယ် kai | [kɛ́] | ကဲ kai: |
| /ɛ/ | [kɛ̰] | ကည့် kany. | [kɛ̀] | ကည် kany | [kɛ́] | ကည်း kany: |
| /i/ | [kḭ] | ကိ ki. | [kì] | ကီ ki | [kí] | ကီး ki: |
| /i/ | [kḭ] | ကည့် kany. | [kì] | ကည် kany | [kí] | ကည်း kany: |
| /u/ | [kṵ] | ကု ku. | [kù] | ကူ ku | [kú] | ကူး ku: |
| /e/ | [kḛ] | ကေ့ ke. | [kè] | ကေ ke | [ké] | ကေး ke: |
| /ɔ/ | [kɔ̰] | ကော့ kau. | [kɔ̀] | ကော် kau | [kɔ́] | ကော kau: |
| /o/ | [ko̰] | ကို့ kui. | [kò] | ကို kui | [kó] | ကိုး kui: |

=== Closed glottal stop syllables ===
Below are the possible combinations of glottal stop syllable rhymes in Burmese spelling, used with the letter ⟨က⟩ [k] as a sample. Burmese spelling retains the consonantal finals that have since merged to the glottal stop in spoken Burmese.

| Rhyme | -k (-က်) | | -c (-စ်) | | -t (-တ်) and -p (-ပ်) | |
| Rhyme | Phoneme | Grapheme | Phoneme | Grapheme | Phoneme | Grapheme |
|---|---|---|---|---|---|---|
| /-ɛʔ/ | [kɛʔ] | ကက် kak | | | | |
| /-ɪʔ/ | | | [kɪʔ] | ကစ် kac | | |
| /-aʔ/ | | | | | [kaʔ] | ကတ် kat |
| /-aʔ/ | | | | | [kaʔ] | ကပ် kap |
| /-ʊʔ/ | | | | | [kʊʔ] | ကွတ် kwat |
| /-ʊʔ/ | | | | | [kʊʔ] | ကွပ် kwap |
| /-eɪʔ/ | | | | | [keɪʔ] | ကိတ် kit |
| /-eɪʔ/ | | | | | [keɪʔ] | ကိပ် kip |
| /-oʊʔ/ | | | | | [koʊʔ] | ကုတ် kut |
| /-oʊʔ/ | | | | | [koʊʔ] | ကုပ် kup |
| /-aʊʔ/ | [kaʊʔ] | ကောက် kauk | | | | |
| /-aɪʔ/ | [kaɪʔ] | ကိုက် kuik | | | | |

=== Closed nasalised syllables ===
Below are the possible combinations of nasalised syllable rhymes in Burmese spelling, used with the letter ⟨က⟩ [k] as a sample.

| Rhyme | Creaky tone | | Low tone | | High tone | |
| Rhyme | Phoneme | Grapheme | Phoneme | Grapheme | Phoneme | Grapheme |
|---|---|---|---|---|---|---|
| /-ɪɰ̃/ | [kɪ̰ɰ̃] | ကင့် kang. | [kɪ̀ɰ̃] | ကင် kang | [kɪ́ɰ̃] | ကင်း kang: |
| /-ɪɰ̃/ | [kɪ̰ɰ̃] | ကဉ့် kany. | [kɪ̀ɰ̃] | ကဉ် kany | [kɪ́ɰ̃] | ကဉ်း kany: |
| /-aɰ̃/ | [ka̰ɰ̃] | ကန့် kan. | [kàɰ̃] | ကန် kan | [káɰ̃] | ကန်း kan: |
| /-aɰ̃/ | [ka̰ɰ̃] | ကမ့် kam. | [kàɰ̃] | ကမ် kam | [káɰ̃] | ကမ်း kam: |
| /-aɰ̃/ | [ka̰ɰ̃] | ကံ့ kam. | [kàɰ̃] | ကံ kam | [káɰ̃] | ကံး kam: |
| /-eɪɰ̃/ | [kḛɪɰ̃] | ကိန့် kin. | [kèɪɰ̃] | ကိန် kin | [kéɪɰ̃] | ကိန်း kin: |
| /-eɪɰ̃/ | [kḛɪɰ̃] | ကိမ့် kim. | [kèɪɰ̃] | ကိမ် kim | [kéɪɰ̃] | ကိမ်း kim: |
| /-eɪɰ̃/ | [kḛɪɰ̃] | ကိံ့ kim. | [kèɪɰ̃] | ကိံ kim | [kéɪɰ̃] | ကိံး kim: |
| /-oʊɰ̃/ | [ko̰ʊɰ̃] | ကုန့် kun. | [kòʊɰ̃] | ကုန် kun | [kóʊɰ̃] | ကုန်း kun: |
| /-oʊɰ̃/ | [ko̰ʊɰ̃] | ကုမ့် kum. | [kòʊɰ̃] | ကုမ် kum | [kóʊɰ̃] | ကုမ်း kum: |
| /-oʊɰ̃/ | [ko̰ʊɰ̃] | ကုံ့ kum. | [kòʊɰ̃] | ကုံ kum | [kóʊɰ̃] | ကုံး kum: |
| /-aʊɰ̃/ | [ka̰ʊɰ̃] | ကောင့် kaung. | [kàʊɰ̃] | ကောင် kaung | [káʊɰ̃] | ကောင်း kaung: |
| /-aɪɰ̃/ | [ka̰ɪɰ̃] | ကိုင့် kuing. | [kàɪɰ̃] | ကိုင် kuing | [káɪɰ̃] | ကိုင်း kuing: |
| /-ʊɰ̃/ | [kʊ̰ɰ̃] | ကွန့် kwan. | [kʊ̀ɰ̃] | ကွန် kwan | [kʊ́ɰ̃] | ကွန်း kwan: |
| /-ʊɰ̃/ | [kʊ̰ɰ̃] | ကွမ့် kwam. | [kʊ̀ɰ̃] | ကွမ် kwam | [kʊ́ɰ̃] | ကွမ်း kwam: |

== Numerals ==
Burmese uses a decimal numbering system based on the Hindu–Arabic numeral system, with unique numerals for the digits from zero to nine. Separators, such as commas, are traditionally not used to group numbers. For instance, the number 1945 is written ⟨၁၉၄၅⟩.

| 0 ၀ | 1 ၁ | 2 ၂ | 3 ၃ | 4 ၄ | 5 ၅ | 6 ၆ | 7 ၇ | 8 ၈ | 9 ၉ |

== Punctuation and other symbols ==
Burmese has two native punctuation marks. Burmese also uses Western-style punctuation marks, including parentheses, ellipses, and slashes. Others like the exclamation mark and question mark are used more sparingly.

| Symbol | Usage |
|---|---|
| ၊ | Called pot-phyat (ပုဒ်ဖြတ်), pod-gale (ပုဒ်ကလေး). Equivalent to a comma, used to introduce a break within a sentence. Also called pot-hti (ပုဒ်ထီး) or ta-chaung-pot (တစ်ချောင်းပုဒ်). |
| ။ | Called pot-ma (ပုဒ်မ). Equivalent to a full stop, used at the end of a complete sentence. Also called pot-gyi (ပုဒ်ကြီး) or hna-chaung-pot (နှစ်ချောင်းပုဒ်). |

The literary register of Burmese also uses several symbols used to abbreviate frequently used grammatical particles:

| Symbol | Usage |
|---|---|
| ၏ IPA: /ʔḭ/ | possessive ( 's, of), also used as a full stop if the sentence immediately ends with a verb |
| ၍ IPA: /jwḛ/ | conjunction |
| ၌ IPA: n̥aɪʔ | locative ('at') |
| ၎င်း IPA: ləɡáʊɴ | 'ditto' or 'ibid.' (typically used in columns and lists). Abbreviation of ⟨လည်းကောင်း⟩. |

== Unicode ==
The Burmese script was added to the Unicode Standard in September 1999 with the release of version 3.0.

The Unicode block for Myanmar is U+1000–U+109F:

Myanmar^{[1]} Official Unicode Consortium code chart (PDF)
| | 0 | 1 | 2 | 3 | 4 | 5 | 6 | 7 | 8 | 9 | A | B | C | D | E | F |
| U+100x | က | ခ | ဂ | ဃ | င | စ | ဆ | ဇ | ဈ | ဉ | ည | ဋ | ဌ | ဍ | ဎ | ဏ |
| U+101x | တ | ထ | ဒ | ဓ | န | ပ | ဖ | ဗ | ဘ | မ | ယ | ရ | လ | ဝ | သ | ဟ |
| U+102x | ဠ | အ | ဢ | ဣ | ဤ | ဥ | ဦ | ဧ | ဨ | ဩ | ဪ | ါ | ာ | ိ | ီ | ု |
| U+103x | ူ | ေ | ဲ | ဳ | ဴ | ဵ | ံ | ့ | း | ္ | ် | ျ | ြ | ွ | ှ | ဿ |
| U+104x | ၀ | ၁ | ၂ | ၃ | ၄ | ၅ | ၆ | ၇ | ၈ | ၉ | ၊ | ။ | ၌ | ၍ | ၎ | ၏ |
| U+105x | ၐ | ၑ | ၒ | ၓ | ၔ | ၕ | ၖ | ၗ | ၘ | ၙ | ၚ | ၛ | ၜ | ၝ | ၞ | ၟ |
| U+106x | ၠ | ၡ | ၢ | ၣ | ၤ | ၥ | ၦ | ၧ | ၨ | ၩ | ၪ | ၫ | ၬ | ၭ | ၮ | ၯ |
| U+107x | ၰ | ၱ | ၲ | ၳ | ၴ | ၵ | ၶ | ၷ | ၸ | ၹ | ၺ | ၻ | ၼ | ၽ | ၾ | ၿ |
| U+108x | ႀ | ႁ | ႂ | ႃ | ႄ | ႅ | ႆ | ႇ | ႈ | ႉ | ႊ | ႋ | ႌ | ႍ | ႎ | ႏ |
| U+109x | ႐ | ႑ | ႒ | ႓ | ႔ | ႕ | ႖ | ႗ | ႘ | ႙ | ႚ | ႛ | ႜ | ႝ | ႞ | ႟ |
Notes 1.As of Unicode version 18.0

== See also ==
- Romanization of Burmese
- Mon–Burmese script
- Burmese Braille
- Burmese respelling of the English alphabet

== Bibliography ==
- "A History of the Myanmar Alphabet" (PDF). Myanmar Language Commission. 1993. Archived from the original (PDF) on 26 March 2010.
- Aung-Thwin, Michael (2005). The Mists of Rāmañña: The Legend that was Lower Burma (illustrated ed.). Honolulu: University of Hawai'i Press. ISBN 978-0-8248-2886-8.
- Harvey, G. E. (1925). History of Burma: From the Earliest Times to 10 March 1824. London: Frank Cass & Co. Ltd.
- Herbert, Patricia M.; Milner, Anthony (1989). South-East Asia. University of Hawaii Press. ISBN 978-0-8248-1267-6.
- Hosken, Martin. (2012). "Representing Myanmar in Unicode: Details and Examples" (ver. 4). Unicode Technical Note 11.
- Lieberman, Victor B. (2003). Strange Parallels: Southeast Asia in Global Context, c. 800–1830, volume 1, Integration on the Mainland. Cambridge University Press. ISBN 978-0-521-80496-7.
- Sawada, Hideo. (2013). "Some Properties of Burmese Script". Presented at the 23rd Meeting of the Southeast Asian Linguistics Society (SEALS23), Chulalongkorn University, Thailand.
