= Macedonian Sign Language =

Sign language used in North Macedonia

Macedonian Sign
- македонски знаковен јазик makedonski znakoven jazik
- Native to: North Macedonia
- Native speakers: 6,000 have requested signed news on television
- Language family: French Sign: Austro-Hungarian Sign; Yugoslav Sign; Macedonian Sign

Language codes
- ISO 639-3: None (mis)
- Glottolog: None
- IETF: ysl-MK

Macedonian Sign Language (Macedonian: македонски знаковен јазик or македонски гестовен јазик; МЗЈ or МГЈ, romanized: makedonski znakoven jazik or makedonski gestoven jazik; MZJ or MGJ) is the sign language of the deaf community in North Macedonia. As in all sign languages, Macedonian Sign Language is based on gestures and body movements, particularly movements with the hands. The precise number of signers in North Macedonia is not known, but 6,000 people request signed news on Macedonian television. The learning and the usage of the language, as well as the rights of the deaf community in North Macedonia, are regulated by a national law.

== Alphabet ==
The alphabet is made of 31 signs, which is equal to the 31 sounds of Macedonian. Each letter has its own sign. There are two types of the alphabet: the alphabet expressed with one hand and alphabet expressed with two hands.

== Regulation ==
Macedonian Sign language is regulated by a national law as of 21 August 2009. Macedonian law defines it as following:

The Sign language, according to this law, is recognised as a natural way of communication, equal to the oral communication. The Sign language is a language that is used for mutual understanding between the people with hearing impairment, i.e. it is a natural means of communication among these and other physical and juridical people. The language is a visual system of signs, that understands special positions, directions and movements of hands and fingers and mimicry on the face.

However, the law includes several things, such as defining the language itself, defining the rights of the deaf people of North Macedonia, studying the language, preparing interpreters, defining the tasks of the National Association of Deaf People of North Macedonia and its financing, and securing implementation of the rights of the deaf people. Each individual is allowed to request a Sign language interpreter and the institution where such request has been made, or the individual itself, is obliged to find one.
