= Chinese respelling of the English alphabet =

Chinese pronunciation of the English alphabet

In China, letters of the English alphabet are pronounced somewhat differently because they have been adapted to the phonetics (i.e. the syllable structure) of the Chinese language. The knowledge of this spelling may be useful when spelling Western names, especially over the phone, as one may not be understood if the letters are pronounced as they are in English.

Letter	Spelling	
A	诶	ēi
B	必	bì
C	西	xī
D	弟	dì
E	衣	yī
F	艾付	àifù
G	记	jì
H	爱耻	àichǐ
I	挨	āi
J	宅	zhái
K	开	kāi
L	饿罗	èluó
M	饿母	èmǔ
N	恩	ēn
O	呕	ǒu
P	披	pī
Q	酷	kù
R	耳	ěr
S	艾斯	àisī
T	踢	tī
U	忧	yōu
V	维	wéi
W	大波留	dàbōliú
X	埃克斯	āikèsī
Y	歪	wāi
Z	再得	zàide
