= Languages of North Macedonia =

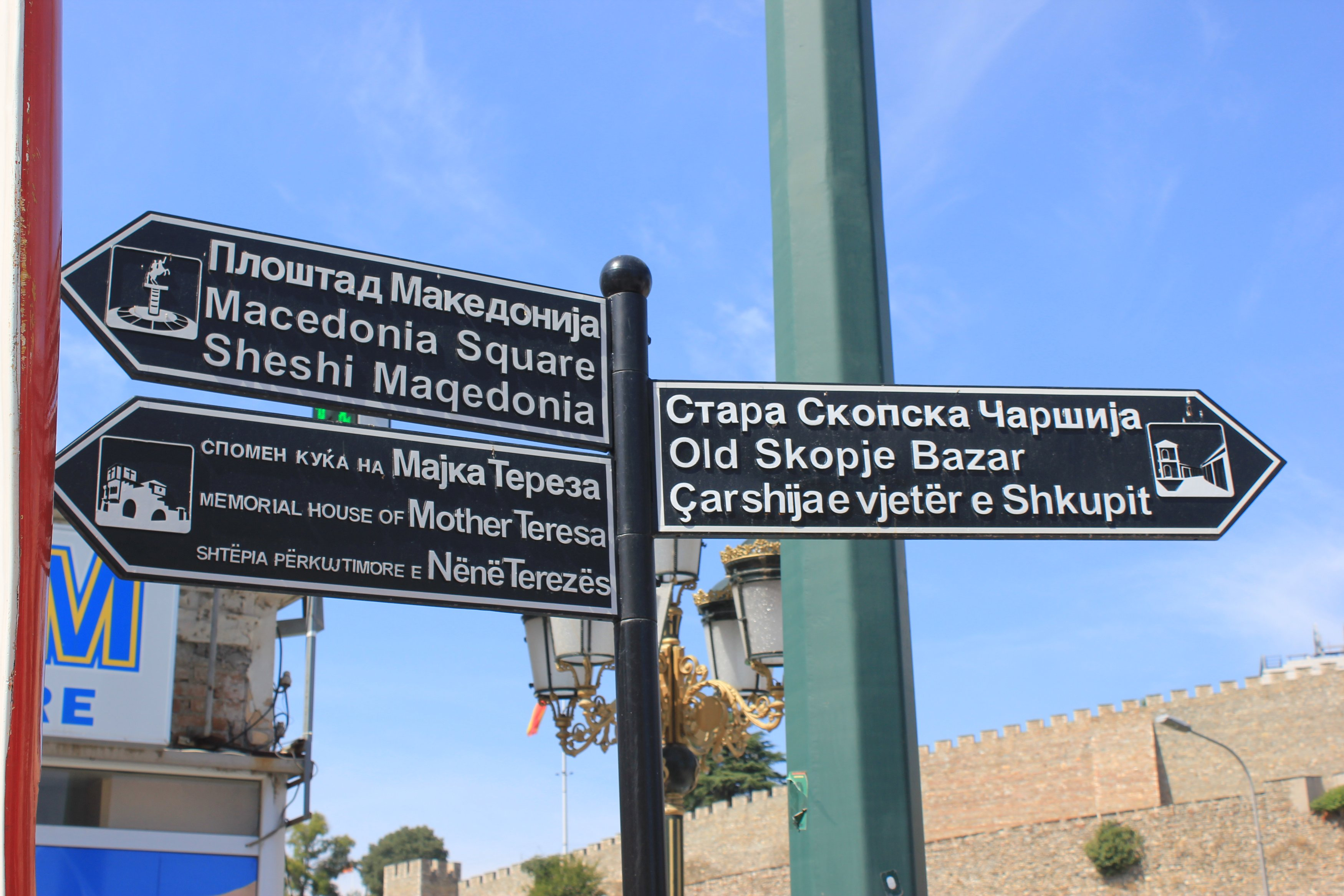
- Signage in Macedonian, English, and Albanian in Skopje
- Official: Macedonian, Albanian (co-official)
- Minority: Turkish, Romani, Serbian, Bosnian & Aromanian
- Foreign: Serbo-Croatian, English, Russian, French, German
- Signed: Macedonian Sign Language
- Keyboard layout: Macedonian Cyrillic

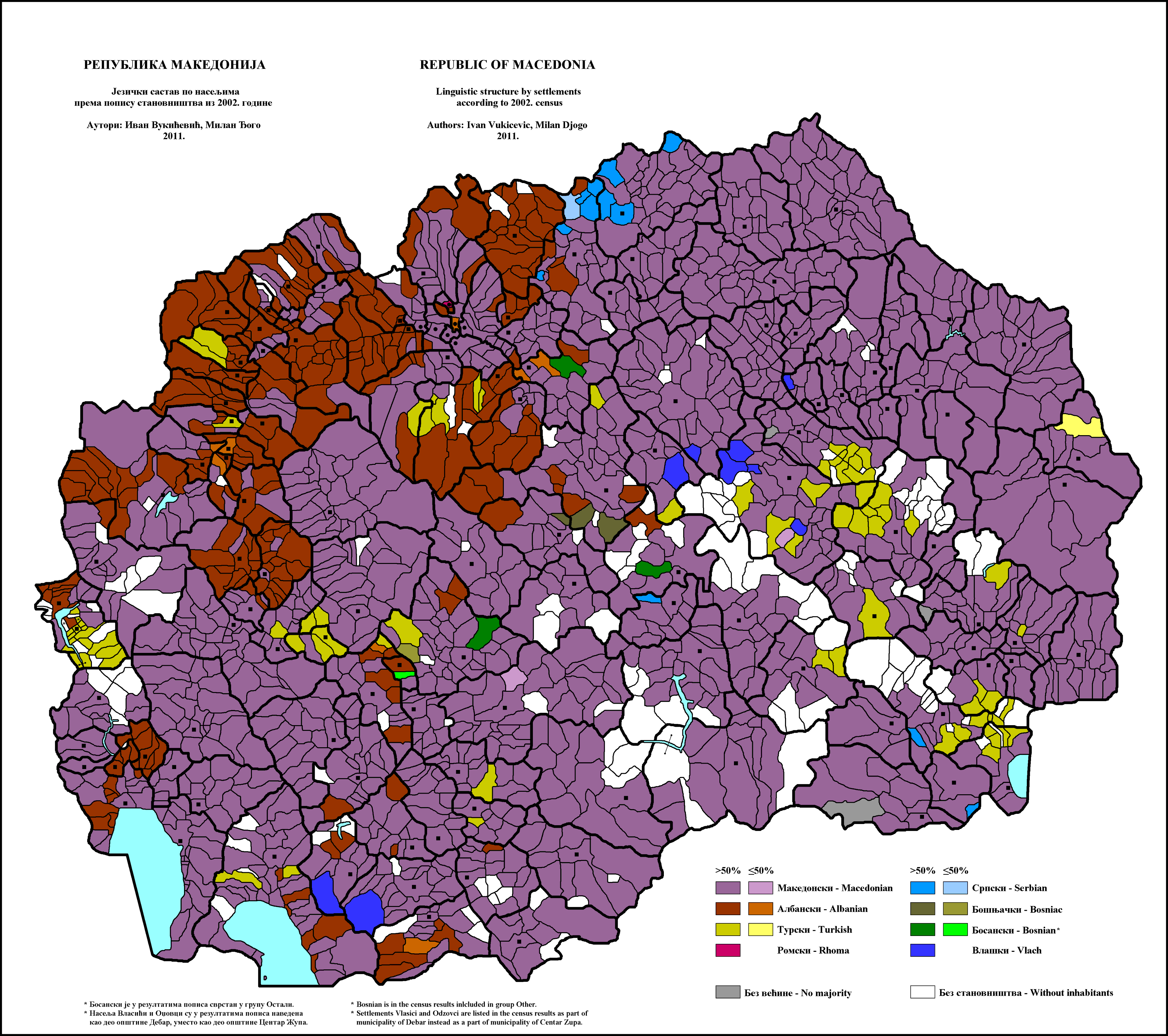
Linguistic map of North Macedonia, 2002 census.

The official language of North Macedonia is Macedonian, while Albanian has co-official status. Macedonian is spoken by roughly two-thirds of the population natively, and as a second language by much of the rest of the population. Albanian is the largest minority language. There are a further five national minority languages: Turkish, Romani, Serbian, Bosnian, and Aromanian. The Macedonian Sign Language is the country's official sign language.

== Statistics ==
According to the 2002 census, North Macedonia had a population of 2,022,547. A total of 1,344,815 Macedonian citizens declared they speak Macedonian, 507,989 speak Albanian, 71,757 speak Turkish, 38,528 speak Roma, 6,884 speak Aromanian, 24,773 speak Serbian, 8,560 speak Bosnian and 19,241 speak other languages.

== Language policy ==
=== Macedonian (official and national) ===
The language policy in North Macedonia is regulated by the 7 Article of the Constitution of North Macedonia and the Law of languages. According to the national constitution:

1. The Macedonian language, written using its Cyrillic alphabet, is the official language throughout the Republic of North Macedonia and in the international relations of the Republic of North Macedonia.
2. Any other language spoken by at least 20 percent of the population is also an official language, written using its alphabet, as specified below.
3. Any official personal documents of citizens speaking an official language other than Macedonian shall also be issued in that language, in addition to the Macedonian language, in accordance with the law.
4. Any person living in a unit of local self-government in which at least 20 percent of the population speaks an official language other than Macedonian may use that official language to communicate with the office of the central government with responsibility for that municipality; such an office shall reply in that language in addition to Macedonian. Any person may use any official language to communicate with a main office of the central government, which shall reply in that language in addition to Macedonian.
5. In the organs of the Republic of North Macedonia, any official language other than Macedonian may be used in accordance with the law.
6. In the units of local self-government where at least 20 percent of the population speaks a particular language, that language and its alphabet shall be used as an official language in addition to the Macedonian language and the Cyrillic alphabet. With respect to languages spoken by less than 20 percent of the population of a unit of local self-government, the local authorities shall decide on their use in public bodies.

=== Albanian language (co-official) ===
On 15 January 2019 the Law on the Use of Languages came into effect, despite the refusal of President Gjorge Ivanov to sign off on it. The law was published in the government gazette after being signed by parliament Speaker Talat Xhaferi. In this way Albanian became a second official language in North Macedonia. The Albanian language until then could only be co-official in the areas where the Albanian minority represented at least 20% of the population per the 2008 Law on the Use of Languages spoken by at least 20% of the citizens in the units of the local self-government. The new law extended the official use of Albanian over the entire country, easing communication in Albanian with the institutions. Under the new legislation, Macedonian continues to be the primary official language, while Albanian may be used now as a second one, including at a national level in official matters. The legislation stipulates also all public institutions in the country will provide Albanian translations in their everyday work. In its opinion regarding the law on December 2019, the Venice Commission stated: "The new law considerably extends the use of the Albanian language and in many respects goes beyond European standards." Despite since 2019 the usage of Albanian language being no longer geographically limited, the Macedonian language with the Cyrillic alphabet remains the only official language throughout the whole territory of North Macedonia and its international relations, per Macedonian Government. However, there are still problems of the use of Albanian as the second official language in North Macedonia.

=== Minority languages ===
Some minority languages are co-official, along with Macedonian, in the municipalities (opštini) where they are spoken by at least 20% of the municipal population. Turkish is co-official in Centar Župa, Karbinci, Konče, Plasnica, and Vasilevo. Romani is co-official in Šuto Orizari.

== List of languages ==
=== Macedonian ===
Macedonian (македонски јазик, makedonski jazik) is a South Slavic language, spoken as a first language by approximately 1.4–2.5 million people, principally in North Macedonia and the Macedonian diaspora. It is the official language in North Macedonia and a recognized minority language in parts of Albania, Romania and Serbia.

Standard Macedonian was implemented as the official language of the Socialist Republic of Macedonia in 1945 and has since developed a thriving literary tradition. Most of the codification was formalized during the same period.

=== Albanian ===
Albanian (gjuha shqipe) is an Indo-European language spoken by over 7.3 million people world-wide, primarily in Albania and Kosovo but also in other areas of the Balkans in which there is an Albanian population, including western North Macedonia, southern Montenegro, southern Serbia and Greece. Albanian is also spoken in centuries-old Albanian-based dialect speaking communities scattered in southern Greece, southern Italy, Sicily, Ukraine and the Albanian diaspora. Within North Macedonia, Albanian is spoken in western and northern parts of the Republic. As of January 2019 it has become the co-official language in North Macedonia.

=== Turkish ===
Turkish (Türkçe) is the most populous of the Turkic languages, with over 70 million native speakers. Speakers are located predominantly in Turkey, with smaller groups in Germany, Bulgaria, North Macedonia, Cyprus (mostly in the occupied North of the island), Greece (mostly in Western Thrace), and other parts of Eastern Europe, Caucasus and Central Asia. Small Turkish-speaking communities can be found in several places in North Macedonia, such as Vrapčište, Skopje and Gostivar.

Turkish speakers are above the 20% threshold for local official use in Plasnica Municipality (97%), Centar Župa (59%), Karbinci Municipality (25%), Vasilevo Municipality (23%), and Konče Municipality (22%) as of the 2021 census.

=== Romani ===
Balkan Romani (Romani: romani ćhib) is one of several related languages of the Romani people, belonging to the Indo-Aryan branch of the Indo-European language family. Many varieties of Romani are divergent and sometimes considered languages of their own. The largest of these are Vlax Romani (about 900,000 speakers), Balkan Romani (700,000), Carpathian Romani (500,000) and Sinti Romani (300,000). In North Macedonia, Balkan Romani is spoken. Šuto Orizari is the largest Romani-speaking settlement in the country.

=== Serbian language ===
Serbian (српски, srpski) is a standardized register of the Serbo-Croatian language spoken by Serbs, mainly in Serbia, Bosnia and Herzegovina, Montenegro, Croatia and North Macedonia. It is very similar to the Macedonian language. It is official in Serbia and one of the official languages of Bosnia and Herzegovina, and is the principal language of the Serbs.

Serbian speakers do not form greater than the 20% needed threshold for official use in any municipality as of the 2021 census. The two municipalities with the highest percentage of Serbian speakers are Staro Nagoričane (9.6%) and Čučer-Sandevo (8.6%).

=== Bosnian language ===
Bosnian (bosanski, босански) is another standardized register of Serbo-Croatian, spoken by Bosniaks. As a standardized form of the Shtokavian dialect, it is one of the three official languages of Bosnia and Herzegovina.

Most of the Bosnian-speaking Macedonian citizens live in the Vardar region, though they do not form greater than the 20% threshold in any municipality in the country. The municipalities with the highest percentages of Bosnian speakers are Petrovec Municipality (19%), Dolneni Municipality (15.3%), Gradsko Municipality (11%), and Studeničani Municipality (7.4%), as of the 2021 census.

=== Aromanian ===
Aromanian (Limba Armãneascã) or Vlach is an Eastern Romance language spoken in several pockets across Southeastern Europe. Its speakers are called Aromanians or "Vlachs" (which is an exonym in widespread use to define the communities in the Balkans). It shares many features with modern Romanian, having similar morphology and syntax, as well as a large common vocabulary inherited from Latin. An important source of dissimilarity between Romanian and Aromanian is the adstratum languages: while Romanian has been influenced to a greater extent by the Slavic languages, Aromanian has been more influenced by the Greek language, with which it has been in close contact throughout its history. The largest Aromanian-speaking community in North Macedonia can be found in the town of Kruševo (21.1% of the municipal population). In North Macedonia, the language is known as 'Vlach' (влашки јазик, vlaški jazik).

=== Sign language ===
The Macedonian sign language (Macedonian: македонски знаковен јазик, romanized: makedonski znakoven jazik or македонски гестовен јазик / makedonski gestoven jazik) is a sign language of the deaf community in North Macedonia. As all sign languages, the Macedonian sign language is also based on gestures and body movements, particularly movements with the hands. The precise number of signers in North Macedonia is not known, but 6,000 people in 2012 requested signed news on Macedonian television. The learning and the usage of the language, as well as the rights of the deaf community in North Macedonia are regulated by a national law.

=== Foreign languages ===
Many people speak a foreign language. A rapidly declining share of the population, consisting almost entirely of elderly people, has knowledge of Serbo-Croatian, French or German. Russian is also well-known. Among the younger population, English is extremely common, along with knowledge of Serbo-Croatian and some German.

== See also ==
- Demographics of North Macedonia
