= Croatian Sign Language =

Deaf sign language of Croatia

Croatian Sign
- hrvatski znakovni jezik
- Native to: Croatia
- Native speakers: 6,500 (2019) out of 20,000 deaf
- Language family: French Sign: Austro-Hungarian Sign; Yugoslav Sign; Croatian Sign

Language codes
- ISO 639-3: csq
- Glottolog: croa1242

Croatian Sign Language (Croatian: hrvatski znakovni jezik, HZJ) is a sign language of the deaf community in Croatia. It has in the past been regarded as a dialect of Yugoslav Sign Language, although the dialectical diversity of the former Yugoslavia has not been assessed.

The first school for the deaf in Croatia was formed in Zagreb in 1885. The Sign Language and Deaf Culture conference was held in Zagreb, Croatia from May 3–5, 2001. In 2004, a project to establish a grammar of HZJ was started by researchers at Purdue University and the University of Zagreb.

By law Croatian Radiotelevision is to promote the translation of programs into HZJ. Major centres of education in HZJ are found in Zagreb, Split, Rijeka, and Osijek.

Organizations for the deaf in Croatia include the Croatian Association of Deafblind Persons DODIR, which was established in 1994.

The basic word order in HZJ is subject–verb–object (SVO), as it is in spoken Croatian. A two-handed manual alphabet is in widespread use; a one-handed alphabet based on the international manual alphabet, though less commonly used, has official status.
