= Languages of Montenegro =

Languages in Montenegro (2023 census)
1. Serbian (43.2%)
2. Montenegrin (34.5%)
3. Bosnian (6.97%)
4. Albanian (5.25%)
5. Russian (2.36%)
6. Serbo-Croatian (2.08%)
7. Other (5.64%)

Languages of Montenegro are languages that are spoken in Montenegro. According to the Constitution of Montenegro that was adopted in 2007, Montenegro has only one official language, specified as Montenegrin, even though Serbian is used by 43% of the population and Montenegrin by 35% of population. There is an ongoing debate about the distinct nature of Montenegrin language in relation to the Serbo-Croatian dialectal continuum. Montenegrin can be written in both the Latin and Cyrillic alphabets, but there is a growing political movement to use only the Latin alphabet.

Legally recognized minority languages are Albanian, Bosnian, and Croatian. As of 2017, Albanian is an official language of the municipalities of Podgorica, Ulcinj, Bar, Pljevlja, Rozaje and Tuzi. Additionally, there are a few hundred Italians in Montenegro, concentrated in the Bay of Kotor (Cattaro).

Romani is a protected language.

== Minority languages of Montenegro ==
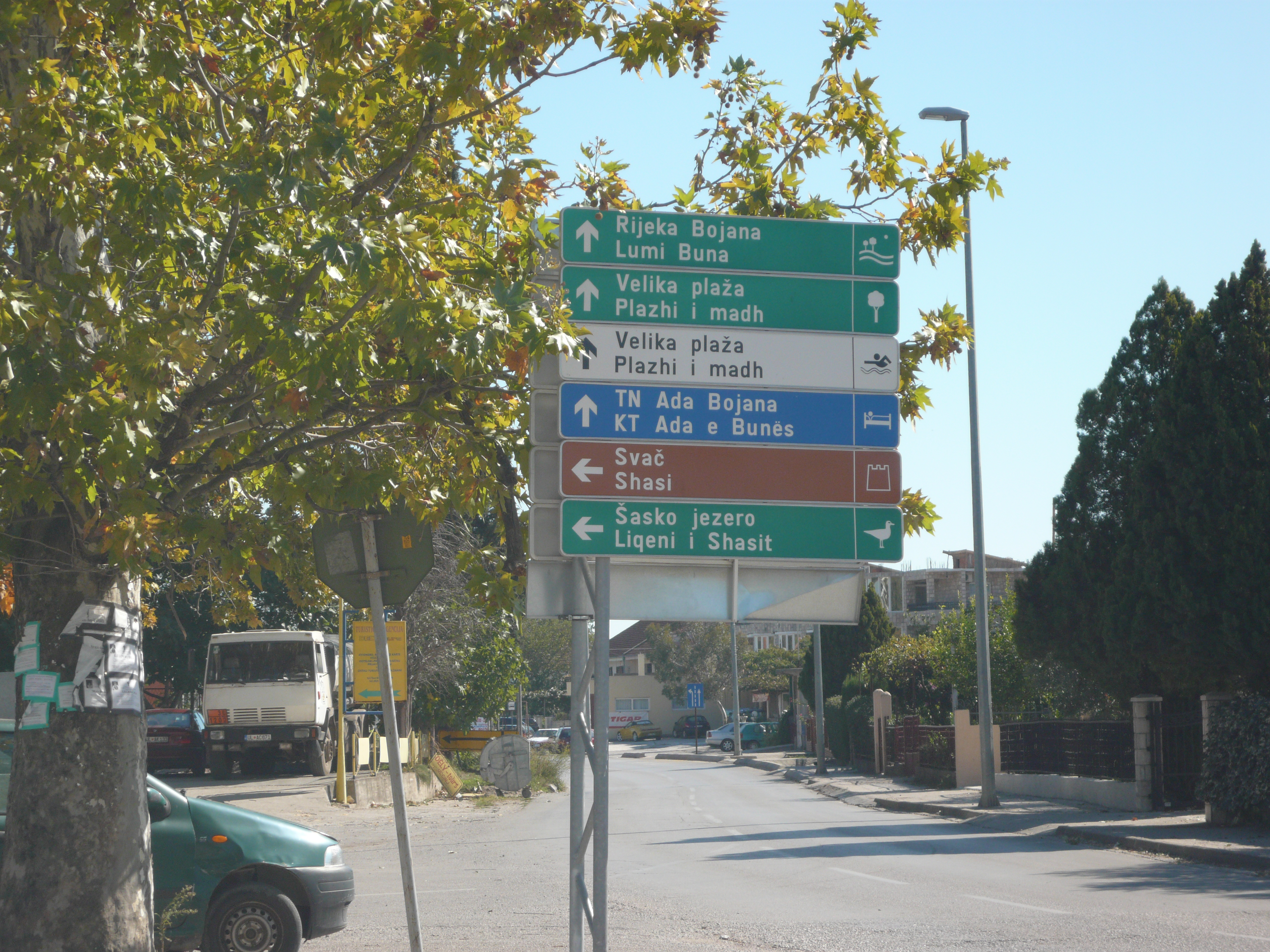
Bilingual signs in Ulcinj; the top of the signs is in Serbo-Croatian, while the bottom is in Albanian.

The European Charter for Regional or Minority Languages entered into force in Montenegro in June 2006, following the independence of Montenegro from the State Union of Serbia and Montenegro on 3 June 2006. The Constitution of Montenegro from 2007 states that Montenegrin is the official language of the country, while Bosnian, Croatian, Serbian and Albanian are languages in official use. The Constitution states that languages in official use are those of groups that form at least 1% of the population of Montenegro, as per the 2003 population census. The Law on National Minorities specifies that the percentage of members of national minorities in total population of the local government should be 15% in order for their language and script to be introduced in official use. Media founded by the Montenegro government are obliged to broadcast news, cultural, educational, sports and entertainment programs in minority languages. Minorities and their members have the right to education in their language in regular and vocational education.

== Dialects ==
Map	Dialect	Notes
	Eastern Herzegovinian	*Dialect spoken in the western and northwestern regions of the country.
	Zeta–Raška	*Dialect spoken in the eastern and southeastern parts of the country.

== See also ==
- Languages of Yugoslavia
- Controversy over ethnic and linguistic identity in Montenegro
  - Declaration on the Common Language
  - Language secessionism in Serbo-Croatian
