= Sign Language Interpreters Association of New Zealand =

Professional association

The Sign Language Interpreters Association of New Zealand (SLIANZ) is the national professional body that represents the interests of professional sign language interpreters in New Zealand. It was established in 1996, became an incorporated society in 1997, and is an affiliate member of the New Zealand Society of Translators and Interpreters. Internationally it is a member of the World Association of Sign Language Interpreters and constitutes the second largest representative group of sign language interpreters in the WASLI Oceania region, after Australia.

SLIANZ seeks to "represent and advance the profession by informing members and consumers and promoting high standards of practice and integrity in the field". In addition to requiring its members to adhere to Codes of Ethics and Practice, SLIANZ also provides its members with a mentoring programme and is in the process of trying a new professional development system. SLIANZ produces a quarterly newsletter, holds an annual conference and keeps a Directory (available on its website) of its "full" members—that is, members who are trained and qualified interpreters.

== Honorary members ==
Dan Levitt: an American interpreter and interpreter trainer and educator contracted by the then New Zealand Association of the Deaf, now known as the Deaf Association of New Zealand, to train the first cohort of sign language interpreters in New Zealand.

Dr. Rachel Locker McKee: interpreter (NZSL / ASL <-> English), interpreter trainer and educator, sign language linguist, founding President of SLIANZ; graduated from the first cohort in 1985.

New Zealand Sign Language Teachers Association: The professional body for teachers of New Zealand Sign Language.
