= Burmese respelling of the English alphabet =

Burmese Transcription

In written Burmese, the letters of the English alphabet are transcribed according to how the name of the letter sounds to the Burmese ear.

Letter	BrE IPA	Spelling 1	Spelling 2	Spelling 3	Spelling 4	Examples
A	/ˈeɪ/	အေ				အေဒီ AD
B	/ˈbiː/	ဘီ				ဘီဘီစီ BBC
C	/ˈsiː/	စီ				စီအင်အင် CNN
D	/ˈdiː/	ဒီ				ဂျီဒီပီ GDP
E	/ˈiː/	အီး	အီ			စီအီးအို CEO
F	/ˈɛf/	အက်ဖ်	ဖှ			အက်ဖ်-၂၂ F-22 Raptor
G	/ˈdʒiː/	ဂျီ				ဂျီဒီပီ GDP
H	/ˈeɪtʃ/	အိပ်	အိပ်ချ်	အိတ်ချ်	အိတ်	ဂျော့ အိပ်.ဒဗျူ. ဘွတ်ရှ် George H.W. Bush
I	/ˈaɪ/	အိုင်				အိုင်အင်န်စီ INC
J	/ˈdʒeɪ/	ဂျေ				ဂျေ ကေ ရိုးလင်း J. K. Rowling
K	/ˈkeɪ/	ကေ				ဒီကေဘီအေ DKBA
L	/ˈɛl/	အယ်လ်	အယ်			အန်အယ်ဒီ NLD
M	/ˈɛm/	အမ်				စီဒီအမ်အေ CDMA
N	/ˈɛn/	အင်	အင်န်	အန်		အန်အယ်ဒီ NLD
O	/ˈoʊ/	အို				အင်ဂျီအို NGO
P	/ˈpiː/	ပီ				ဘီဂျေပီ BJP
Q	/ˈkjuː/	ကျူ				ကိုအင်ဇိုင်း ကျူ-၁၀ Coenzyme Q10
R	/ˈɑːr/	အာ	အာရ်			ဂျေ အာ အာ တော်ကီးန် J. R. R. Tolkien
S	/ˈɛs/	အက်စ်	အက်			ဂျီအိုအက်စ် gOS
T	/ˈtiː/	တီ				တီဘီ TB
U	/ˈjuː/	ယူ				ကေအန်ယူ KNU
V	/ˈviː/	ဗီ	ဗွ	ဗွီ		ဗွီအိုအေ VOA
W	/ˈdʌbəl.juː/	ဒဗျူ	ဒဗလူ			ဂျော့ အိပ်.ဒဗျူ. ဘွတ်ရှ် George H.W. Bush
X	/ˈɛks/	အက်စ်	အိတ်ဇ်	အက်ခ်စ်		အိတ်ဇ်ရေး X-ray
Y	/ˈwaɪ/	ဝိုင်				
Z	/ˈzɛd/	ဇက်ဒ်				
