= Yugoslav Sign Language =

Sign language used in the former Yugoslavia

Yugoslav Sign
- Bosnian Sign; Croatian Sign; Macedonian Sign; Serbian Sign; Slovenian Sign
- Native to: Bosnia and Herzegovina, Croatia, Montenegro, North Macedonia, Serbia, Slovenia
- Native speakers: ca. 23,000 (2010–2014)
- Language family: French Sign: Austro-Hungarian Sign; Yugoslav Sign
- Dialects: Bosnian Sign Language; Croatian Sign Language; Kosovar Sign Language; Macedonian Sign Language; Serbian Sign Language; Slovenian Sign Language

Language codes
- ISO 639-3: ysl – inclusive code Individual code: csq – Croatian Sign
- Glottolog: yugo1239

The deaf sign language of the nations of the former Yugoslavia, known variously as Croatian Sign Language, Kosovar Sign Language, Serbian Sign Language, Bosnian Sign Language, Macedonian Sign Language, Slovenian Sign Language, or Yugoslav Sign Language (YSL), started off when children were sent to schools for the deaf in Austro-Hungary in the early 19th century. The first two local schools opened in 1840 in Slovenia and in 1885 in Croatia.

Dialectical distinctions remain between the varieties of the language, with separate (as well as unified) dictionaries being published. These varieties are reported to be mutually intelligible, but the actual amount of variation, and the degree to which the varieties should be considered one language or separate languages, has not been systematically assessed; nor is much known about the sign language situation in these Balkan states.

A two-handed manual alphabet is in widespread use; a one-handed alphabet based on the American manual alphabet, though less commonly used, has official status.

In Bosnia and Herzegovina, the deaf have the same language rights with sign language as the hearing do with oral language. Interpreters must be provided for deaf people dealing with government bodies, and government television broadcasts must be translated into sign language. A Commission for the Sign Language is composed of members representing education, linguistics/pedagogy, and the three constituent nations of Bosnia. By law, Croatian Radiotelevision is to promote the translation of programs into sign language.
