= Two-handed manual alphabets =

Part of a deaf sign language

Several manual alphabets in use around the world employ two hands to represent some or all of the letters of an alphabet, usually as a part of a deaf sign language. Two-handed alphabets are less widespread than one-handed manual alphabets. They may be used to represent the Latin alphabet (for example in the manual alphabet used in Turkish Sign Language) or the Cyrillic alphabet (as is sometimes used in Yugoslav Sign Language).

== BANZSL alphabet ==
This alphabet is used in the BANZSL group of sign languages. It has been used in British Sign Language and Auslan since at least the 19th century, and in New Zealand Sign Language since the 1970s. Variations of this alphabet are also used in dialects of Indo-Pakistani Sign Language.

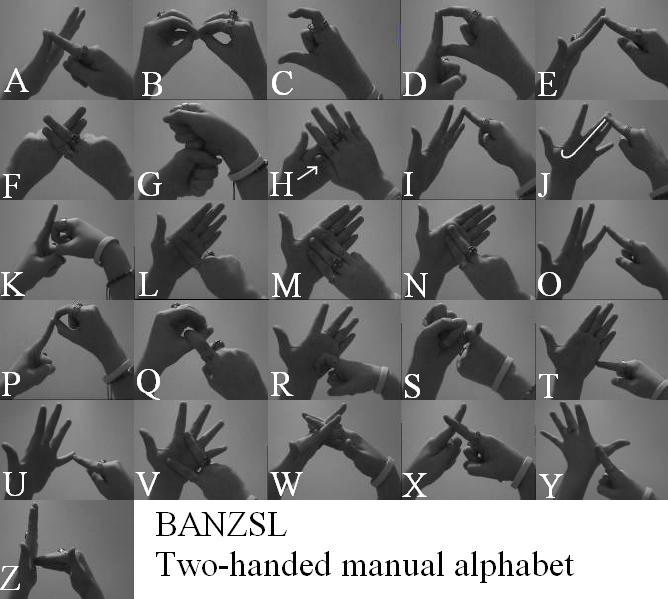
This chart shows the BANZSL alphabet.

=== Notes ===
- Signs may be made with the left or right hand as the dominant hand, but the roles do not usually switch when fingerspelling. The dominant hand generally acts as a pointer (or "pen") while the secondary hand acts as "paper".
- The vowels A, E, I, O and U are formed by touching each digit respectively, starting with the thumb.
- The letters C, D, J, K, P, Q, T, V, X, and Y make the shape of the letter itself.
- The letters B, F, G, L, M, N, R, S, and W suggest the shape of the letter.
- The letters G, L and R suggest only the lowercase form of the letter.
- Only the letters H and Z do not have a strong relation to their shape or position in the alphabet.
- Many letters appear backwards (for example, in right-handed fingerspelling, R and D often appears backwards to the viewer). This is not a mistake or a problem, and your signing does not need to be adjusted to compensate.

== BANZSL deafblind alphabet ==
This is a variation on the above alphabet, modified for tactile use by those communicating with people who are deafblind.

The sender holds the wrist of the receiver. The receiver's hand is relaxed, with the palm open and fingers slightly apart. The signer uses their dominant hand like a pen to sign on the non-dominant hand of the receiver. Fluent users simply pause briefly between words, but it is acceptable for beginners to denote spaces by squeezing the wrist of the receiver to distinguish these from hesitant pauses. AEIOU are the pads of each finger, beginning with the thumb.

A
BANZSL "A" is signed on the tip of the thumb
B
The fingers and thumb are held together to form half of the BANZSL "B" and placed on the palm
C
Draw your finger along the edge of the thumb and up the index finger, alternatively the direction of the sweep can be reversed
D
The signer forms half of the BANZSL "D" with their dominant hand and places it against the recessive hand of the receiver; an alternative is to use the index and middle finger placed against the recessive hand
E
BANZSL "E" is signed on the tip of the index finger
F
Half of the BANZSL "F" is signed either on the palm or on the top of the receiver's index finger
G
Half of the BANZSL "G" is signed on the palm
H
BANZSL "H" is signed across the palm
I
BANZSL "I" is signed on the tip of the middle finger
J
BANZSL "J" is signed on the hand of the receiver
K
Half of the BANZSL "K" is signed on the first knuckle of the index finger
L
BANZSL "L" is signed on the palm
M
BANZSL "M" is signed on the palm
N
BANZSL "N" is signed on the palm
O
BANZSL "O" is signed on the tip of the ring finger
P
Pinch the pad and nail of the index finger (P for pinch)
Q
Hook your curled index finger around the thumb
R
BANZSL "R" is signed on the palm
S
Hook your curled index finger around the little finger
T
BANZSL "T" is signed on the receiver's hand
U
BANZSL "U" is signed on the tip of the little finger
V
BANZSL "V" is signed on the palm
W
There are three ways to do this; all are acceptable, but your receiver might not know them all:
- Interlace your fingers with theirs
- Grab all their fingers from the side (if your hand is folded over, their index finger lies across the first knuckles of your hand)
- Grab their fingers from the top (if your hand is folded over, their fingertips lie across the first knuckles of your hand)
X
Half of the BANZSL "X" is signed on the index finger
Y
The index finger is used to sign a BANZSL "Y" on the hand of the receiver
Z
The side of the palm is placed on the palm of the receiver

== Turkish manual alphabet ==
Current Directions in Turkish Sign Language Research, p. 72, at Google Books

== Yugoslav manual alphabet ==
Some signs are modeled after letters of the Serbian Cyrillic alphabet, others after Gaj's Latin alphabet, or stem from other sources.

== Other two-handed manual alphabets ==
Czech Sign Language also uses a two-handed manual alphabet.

== Other deafblind alphabets ==
From "Deafblind Manual Alphabet", on Deafblind Information, Senses Australia (links added):

"Variations of this alphabet is used in some dialects of Indo-Pakistani Sign Language.
"Other forms of manual deafblind alphabet are used around the world - eg. The Lorm Deafblind Manual Alphabet (Belgium). In some countries, eg. Sweden, the one-handed alphabet used is modified by applying the shape of the letter into the hand of the person who is deafblind at a different angle, making the shape easier to feel."
